= 1984 United Kingdom local elections =

- 3 May 1984

All 36 metropolitan boroughs, 123 out of 296 English districts and all 53 Scottish districts
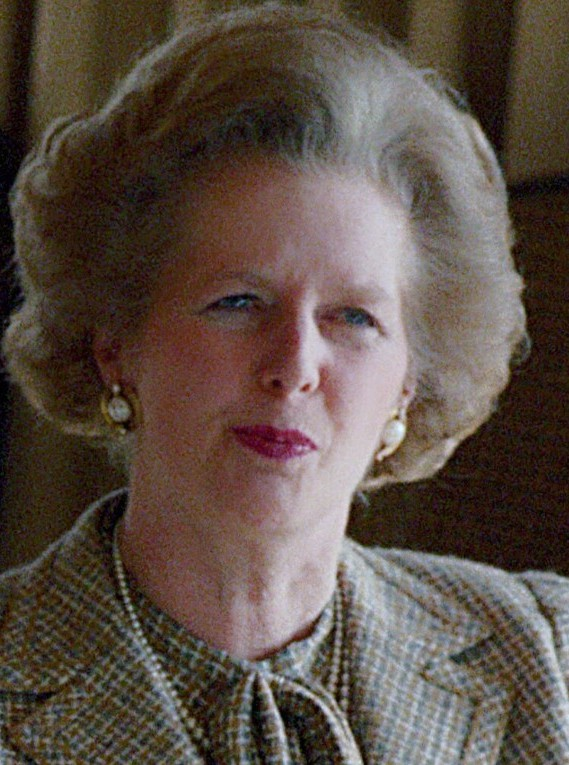

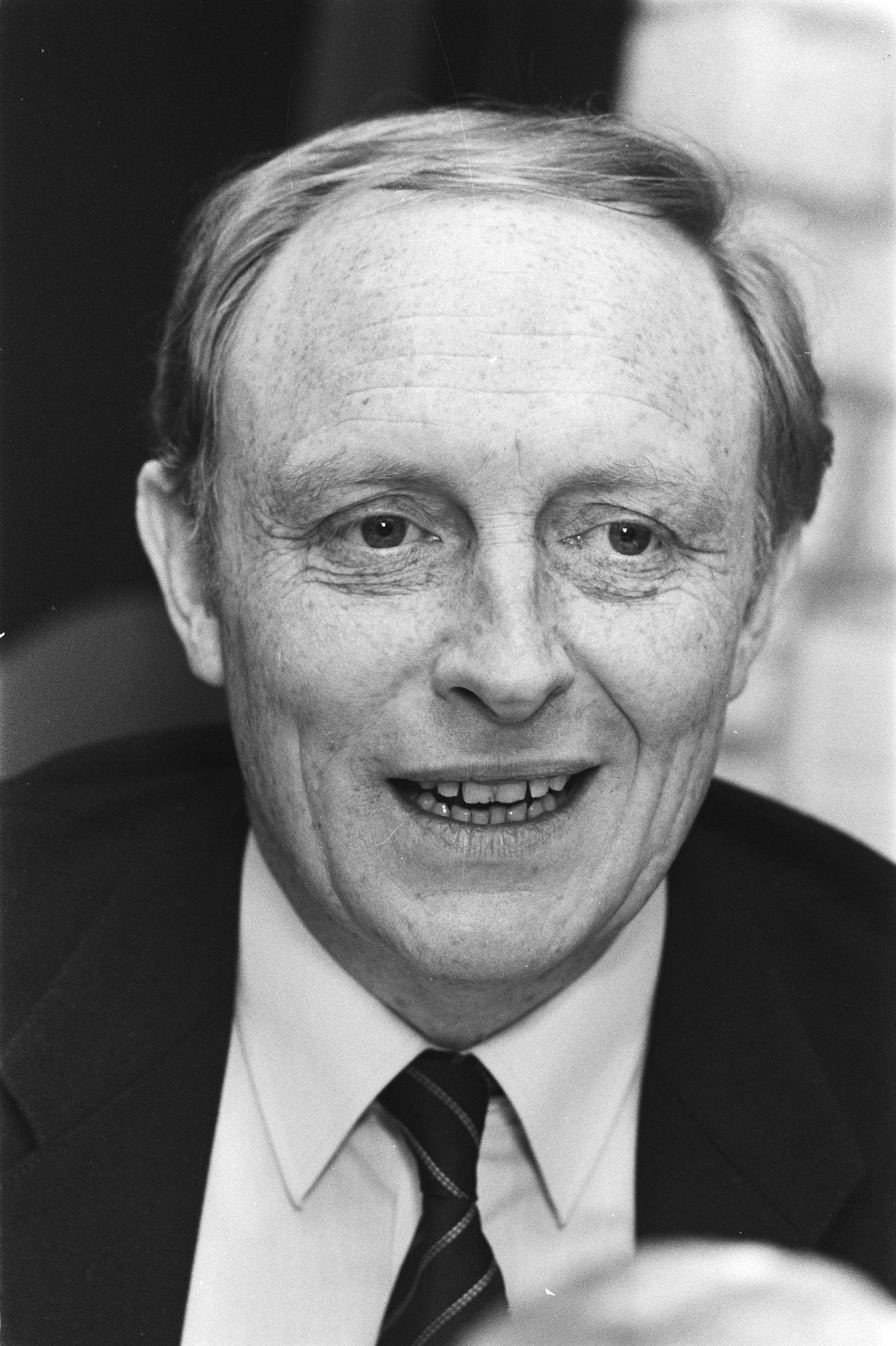

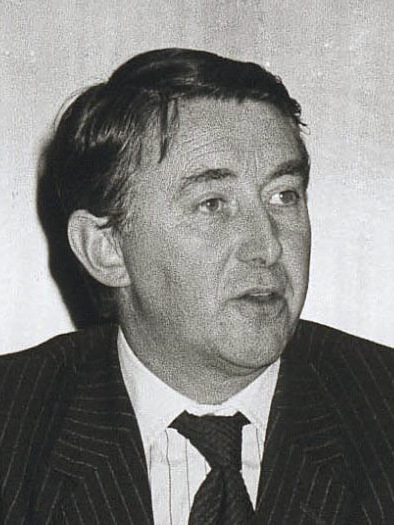

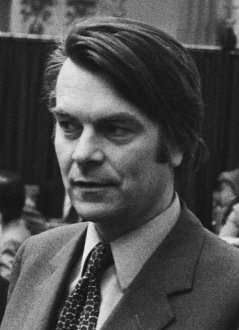
	Majority party	Minority party	Third party
Leader	Margaret Thatcher	Neil Kinnock	David Steel (Lib.); David Owen (SDP)
Party	Conservative	Labour	Alliance
Leader since	11 February 1975	2 October 1983	7 July 1976 / 21 June 1983
Percentage	38%	37%	21%
Councillors	10,393	8,870	2,331
Councillors +/-	▼164	▲88	▲160

Local elections were held in the United Kingdom on 3 May 1984. There was a slight reversal in the Conservative government's fortunes, but the party remained ahead. The projected share of the vote was Conservatives 38%, Labour 37%, Liberal-SDP Alliance 21%.

Labour gained 88 seats, bringing their number of councillors to 8,870 in the first elections under the leadership of Neil Kinnock who had succeeded Michael Foot the previous autumn.

The Conservatives lost 164 seats, leaving them with 10,393 councillors.

The SDP-Liberal Alliance, with the SDP now led by David Owen, gained 160 seats and finished with 2,331 councillors.

Three parliamentary by-elections were also held on the same day in the Cynon Valley, Stafford and South West Surrey constituencies. Labour held Cynon Valley, and the Conservatives held Stafford and South West Surrey.

== England ==
=== Metropolitan boroughs ===
All 36 metropolitan borough councils had one third of their seats up for election.

Council	Previous control	Result	Details
Barnsley	Labour	Labour hold	Details
Birmingham	Conservative	Labour gain	Details
Bolton	Labour	Labour hold	Details
Bradford	No overall control	No overall control hold	Details
Bury	Conservative	Conservative hold	Details
Calderdale	No overall control	No overall control hold	Details
Coventry	Labour	Labour hold	Details
Doncaster	Labour	Labour hold	Details
Dudley	Conservative	No overall control gain	Details
Gateshead	Labour	Labour hold	Details
Kirklees	Labour	Labour hold	Details
Knowsley	Labour	Labour hold	Details
Leeds	Labour	Labour hold	Details
Liverpool	Labour	Labour hold	Details
Manchester	Labour	Labour hold	Details
Newcastle upon Tyne	Labour	Labour hold	Details
North Tyneside	Labour	Labour hold	Details
Oldham	Labour	Labour hold	Details
Rochdale	No overall control	No overall control hold	Details
Rotherham	Labour	Labour hold	Details
Salford	Labour	Labour hold	Details
Sandwell	Labour	Labour hold	Details
Sefton	Conservative	Conservative hold	Details
Sheffield	Labour	Labour hold	Details
Solihull	Conservative	Conservative hold	Details
South Tyneside	Labour	Labour hold	Details
St Helens	Labour	Labour hold	Details
Stockport	No overall control	No overall control hold	Details
Sunderland	Labour	Labour hold	Details
Tameside	Labour	Labour hold	Details
Trafford	Conservative	Conservative hold	Details
Wakefield	Labour	Labour hold	Details
Walsall	No overall control	No overall control hold	Details
Wigan	Labour	Labour hold	Details
Wirral	Conservative	Conservative hold	Details
Wolverhampton	Labour	Labour hold	Details

=== District councils ===
In 123 districts one third of the council was up for election.

A further 20 councils had passed a resolution under section 7 (4) (b) of the Local Government Act 1972, requesting a system of elections by thirds. They could do so because they had had their new ward boundaries introduced at the 1983 elections.

Council	Previous control	Result	Details
Adur	No overall control	No overall control hold	Details
Amber Valley	Labour	Labour hold	Details
Barrow-in-Furness	Labour	Labour hold	Details
Basildon	Labour	Labour hold	Details
Basingstoke and Deane	No overall control	No overall control hold	Details
Bassetlaw	Labour	Labour hold	Details
Bath	Conservative	Conservative hold	Details
Blackburn	Labour	No overall control gain	Details
Brentwood	Conservative	Conservative hold	Details
Brighton	No overall control	No overall control hold	Details
Bristol	No overall control	No overall control hold	Details
Broadland	Conservative	Conservative hold	Details
Broxbourne	Conservative	Conservative hold	Details
Burnley	Labour	Labour hold	Details
Cambridge	No overall control	No overall control hold	Details
Cannock Chase	No overall control	No overall control hold	Details
Carlisle	Labour	Labour hold	Details
Cheltenham	No overall control	No overall control hold	Details
Cherwell	Conservative	Conservative hold	Details
Chester	Conservative	Conservative hold	Details
Chorley	No overall control	No overall control hold	Details
Colchester	Conservative	Conservative hold	Details
Congleton	Conservative	Conservative hold	Details
Craven	Conservative	Conservative hold	Details
Crawley	Labour	Labour hold	Details
Crewe and Nantwich	No overall control	No overall control hold	Details
Daventry	Conservative	Conservative hold	Details
Derby	Labour	Labour hold	Details
East Devon	Conservative	Conservative hold	Details
Eastbourne	Conservative	No overall control gain	Details
Eastleigh	No overall control	No overall control hold	Details
Ellesmere Port and Neston	Labour	Labour hold	Details
Elmbridge	Conservative	Conservative hold	Details
Epping Forest	Conservative	Conservative hold	Details
Exeter	Conservative	No overall control gain	Details
Fareham	Conservative	Conservative hold	Details
Gillingham	Conservative	Conservative hold	Details
Gloucester	Conservative	No overall control gain	Details
Gosport	Conservative	Conservative hold	Details
Great Grimsby	No overall control	No overall control hold	Details
Great Yarmouth	Conservative	Conservative hold	Details
Halton	Labour	Labour hold	Details
Harlow	Labour	Labour hold	Details
Harrogate	Conservative	Conservative hold	Details
Hart	No overall control	No overall control hold	Details
Hartlepool	Labour	Labour hold	Details
Hastings	No overall control	No overall control hold	Details
Havant	Conservative	Conservative hold	Details
Hereford	Alliance	Alliance hold	Details
Hertsmere	Conservative	Conservative hold	Details
Hinckley and Bosworth	Conservative	Conservative hold	Details
Huntingdon	Conservative	Conservative hold	Details
Hyndburn	Labour	Conservative gain	Details
Ipswich	Labour	Labour hold	Details
Kingston upon Hull	Labour	Labour hold	Details
Leicester	Labour	Labour hold	Details
Leominster	Independent	Independent hold	Details
Lincoln	Labour	Labour hold	Details
Macclesfield	Conservative	Conservative hold	Details
Maidstone	No overall control	No overall control hold	Details
Mid Sussex	Conservative	Conservative hold	Details
Milton Keynes	No overall control	No overall control hold	Details
Mole Valley	No overall control	No overall control hold	Details
Newcastle-under-Lyme	Labour	Labour hold	Details
North Bedfordshire	Conservative	Conservative hold	Details
North Hertfordshire	Conservative	Conservative hold	Details
Norwich	Labour	Labour hold	Details
Nuneaton and Bedworth	Labour	Labour hold	Details
Oadby and Wigston	Conservative	Conservative hold	Details
Oxford	Labour	Labour hold	Details
Pendle	No overall control	No overall control hold	Details
Penwith	Independent	Independent hold	Details
Peterborough	No overall control	No overall control hold	Details
Portsmouth	Conservative	Conservative hold	Details
Preston	Labour	Labour hold	Details
Purbeck	Independent	Independent hold	Details
Reading	Conservative	Conservative hold	Details
Redditch	Labour	Labour hold	Details
Reigate and Banstead	Conservative	Conservative hold	Details
Rochford	Conservative	Conservative hold	Details
Rossendale	Conservative	Conservative hold	Details
Rugby	No overall control	No overall control hold	Details
Runnymede	Conservative	Conservative hold	Details
Rushmoor	Conservative	Conservative hold	Details
Scunthorpe	Labour	Labour hold	Details
Shrewsbury and Atcham	No overall control	No overall control hold	Details
Slough	Labour	Labour hold	Details
South Bedfordshire	Conservative	Conservative hold	Details
South Cambridgeshire	Independent	Independent hold	Details
South Herefordshire	Independent	Independent hold	Details
South Lakeland	No overall control	No overall control hold	Details
Southampton	Conservative	Labour gain	Details
Southend-on-Sea	Conservative	Conservative hold	Details
St Albans	Conservative	No overall control gain	Details
Stevenage	Labour	Labour hold	Details
Stoke-on-Trent	Labour	Labour hold	Details
Stratford-on-Avon	Conservative	Conservative hold	Details
Stroud	Conservative	No overall control gain	Details
Swale	Conservative	Conservative hold	Details
Tamworth	Conservative	Conservative hold	Details
Tandridge	Conservative	Conservative hold	Details
Thamesdown	Labour	Labour hold	Details
Three Rivers	Conservative	Conservative hold	Details
Thurrock	Labour	Labour hold	Details
Tonbridge and Malling	Conservative	Conservative hold	Details
Torbay	Conservative	Conservative hold	Details
Tunbridge Wells	Conservative	Conservative hold	Details
Watford	Labour	Labour hold	Details
Waveney	Conservative	Conservative hold	Details
Welwyn Hatfield	Labour	Labour hold	Details
West Dorset	Independent	Independent hold	Details
West Lancashire	Conservative	Conservative hold	Details
West Lindsey	No overall control	No overall control hold	Details
West Oxfordshire	Conservative	No overall control gain	Details
Weymouth and Portland	No overall control	No overall control hold	Details
Winchester	Conservative	Conservative hold	Details
Woking	Conservative	Conservative hold	Details
Wokingham	Conservative	Conservative hold	Details
Woodspring	Conservative	Conservative hold	Details
Worcester	No overall control	No overall control hold	Details
Worthing	Conservative	Conservative hold	Details
Wyre Forest	No overall control	No overall control hold	Details
York	No overall control	No overall control hold	Details

== Scotland ==
=== District councils ===
Council	Previous control	Result	Details
Aberdeen	Labour	Labour hold	Details
Angus	No overall control	SNP gain	Details
Annandale and Eskdale	Independent	Independent hold	Details
Argyll	Independent	Independent hold	Details
Badenoch and Strathspey	Independent	Independent hold	Details
Banff and Buchan	Independent	Independent hold	Details
Bearsden and Milngavie	Conservative	Conservative hold	Details
Berwickshire	Conservative	Conservative hold	Details
Caithness	Independent	Independent hold	Details
Clackmannan	Labour	Labour hold	Details
Clydebank	Labour	Labour hold	Details
Clydesdale	No overall control	No overall control hold	Details
Cumbernauld and Kilsyth	Labour	Labour hold	Details
Cumnock and Doon Valley	Labour	Labour hold	Details
Cunninghame	Labour	Labour hold	Details
Dumbarton	Labour	Labour hold	Details
Dundee	Labour	Labour hold	Details
Dunfermline	Labour	Labour hold	Details
East Kilbride	Labour	Labour hold	Details
East Lothian	Labour	Labour hold	Details
Eastwood	Conservative	Conservative hold	Details
Edinburgh	No overall control	Labour gain	Details
Ettrick and Lauderdale	Independent	Independent hold	Details
Falkirk	Labour	Labour hold	Details
Glasgow	Labour	Labour hold	Details
Gordon	Independent	Independent hold	Details
Hamilton	Labour	Labour hold	Details
Inverclyde	Labour	Labour hold	Details
Inverness	Independent	Independent hold	Details
Kilmarnock and Loudoun	Labour	Labour hold	Details
Kincardine and Deeside	Independent	Independent hold	Details
Kirkcaldy	Labour	Labour hold	Details
Kyle and Carrick	Labour	Conservative gain	Details
Lochaber	Independent	Independent hold	Details
Midlothian	Labour	Labour hold	Details
Monklands	Labour	Labour hold	Details
Moray	Independent	Independent hold	Details
Motherwell	Labour	Labour hold	Details
Nairn	Independent	Independent hold	Details
Nithsdale	No overall control	No overall control hold	Details
North East Fife	Conservative	Alliance gain	Details
Perth and Kinross	Conservative	No overall control gain	Details
Renfrew			Details
Ross and Cromarty	Independent	Independent hold	Details
Roxburgh	Independent	No overall control gain	Details
Skye and Lochalsh	Independent	Independent hold	Details
Stewartry	Independent	Independent hold	Details
Stirling	Labour	Labour hold	Details
Strathkelvin	Labour	Labour hold	Details
Sutherland	Independent	Independent hold	Details
Tweeddale	Independent	Independent hold	Details
West Lothian	Labour	Labour hold	Details
Wigtown	Independent	Independent hold	Details
