= 1984 Worthing Borough Council election =

1984 English local election

- 3 May 1984

12 out of 36 seats to Worthing Borough Council 19 seats needed for a majority

	First party	Second party
Party	Conservative	Alliance
Last election	24 seats, 55.9%	12 seats, 41.4%
Seats won	8	4
Seats after	24	12
Seat change	Steady	Steady
Popular vote	15,414	10,230
Percentage	56.9%	37.7%
Swing	▲1.0%	▼3.7%
Council control before election
Conservative
Council control after election
Conservative

The 1984 Worthing Borough Council election took place on 3 May 1984 to elect members of Worthing Borough Council in West Sussex, England. This was on the same day as other local elections.

== Summary ==
=== Election result ===
1984 Worthing Borough Council election
Party	This election				Full council			This election		
Party	Candidates	Seats	Net	Seats %	Other	Total	Total %	Votes	Votes %	+/−
Conservative	{{{candidates}}}	8	Steady	66.7	16	24	66.7	15,414	56.9	+1.0
Alliance	{{{candidates}}}	4	Steady	33.3	8	12	33.3	10,230	37.7	–3.7
Labour	{{{candidates}}}	0	Steady	0.0	0	0	0.0	1,458	5.4	+3.9

== Ward results ==
=== Broadwater ===
Broadwater
Party	Candidate	Votes	%	±%
Alliance	B. McLuskie	1,266	50.0	–0.5
Conservative	B. Kemp	1,096	43.3	+3.6
Labour	P. Brook	169	6.7	–3.0
Majority		170	6.7	N/A
Turnout		2,531	38.4	–7.9
Registered electors		6,598		
Alliance hold		Swing	▼2.1	

=== Castle ===
Castle
Party	Candidate	Votes	%	±%
Alliance	J. Neal*	1,144	50.5	–6.7
Conservative	R. Elkins	962	42.5	–0.3
Labour	R. Weeks	159	7.0	N/A
Majority		182	8.0	N/A
Turnout		2,265	35.4	–5.4
Registered electors		6,392		
Alliance hold		Swing	▼3.2	

=== Central ===
Central
Party	Candidate	Votes	%	±%
Alliance	G. Robinson	822	51.4	+0.6
Conservative	A. Beaumont*	777	48.6	–0.6
Majority		45	2.8	N/A
Turnout		1,599	28.5	–9.4
Registered electors		5,611		
Alliance gain from Conservative		Swing	▲0.6	

=== Durrington ===
Durrington
Party	Candidate	Votes	%	±%
Conservative	P. Knowles*	1,114	48.9	–1.3
Alliance	M. Clayden	1,021	44.8	–5.0
Labour	J. Austin	143	6.3	N/A
Majority		93	4.1	N/A
Turnout		2,278	35.6	–12.1
Registered electors		6,395		
Conservative hold		Swing	▲1.9	

=== Gaisford ===
Gaisford
Party	Candidate	Votes	%	±%
Alliance	P. Green	1,130	53.4	+1.3
Conservative	R. Price	793	37.5	–10.4
Labour	J. Taylor	192	9.1	N/A
Majority		337	15.9	N/A
Turnout		2,115	33.1	–8.0
Registered electors		6,387		
Alliance hold		Swing	▲5.9	

=== Goring ===
Goring
Party	Candidate	Votes	%	±%
Conservative	C. Cable-Robbie*	2,201	79.9	+26.6
Alliance	D. Elton	555	20.1	–26.6
Majority		1,646	59.7	N/A
Turnout		2,756	40.1	–18.5
Registered electors		6,878		
Conservative hold		Swing	▲26.6	

=== Heene ===
Heene
Party	Candidate	Votes	%	±%
Conservative	S. Moore*	1,669	72.0	–5.1
Alliance	M. O'Callaghan	650	28.0	+5.1
Majority		1,019	43.9	N/A
Turnout		2,319	35.5	–3.7
Registered electors		6,535		
Conservative hold		Swing	▼5.1	

=== Marine ===
Marine
Party	Candidate	Votes	%	±%
Conservative	M. Parkin*	1,642	68.2	+7.1
Alliance	T. Chapman	626	26.0	+5.4
Labour	I. Svennevig	141	5.9	N/A
Majority		1,016	42.2	N/A
Turnout		2,409	38.3	–10.2
Registered electors		6,283		
Conservative hold		Swing	▲0.9	

=== Offington ===
Offington
Party	Candidate	Votes	%	±%
Conservative	S. Elliott*	1,610	71.9	+6.3
Alliance	M. Meredith	487	21.8	–5.6
Labour	S. Hurcombe	141	6.3	N/A
Majority		1,123	50.2	N/A
Turnout		2,238	36.8	–13.1
Registered electors		6,075		
Conservative hold		Swing	▲6.0	

=== Salvington ===
Salvington
Party	Candidate	Votes	%	±%
Conservative	S. Bennett*	1,446	62.5	+6.7
Alliance	J. Crabtree	758	32.8	–11.4
Labour	B. Eustice	110	4.8	N/A
Majority		688	29.7	N/A
Turnout		2,314	34.6	–15.8
Registered electors		6,694		
Conservative hold		Swing	▲9.1	

=== Selden ===
Selden
Party	Candidate	Votes	%	±%
Conservative	E. Baird*	1,014	50.0	–1.8
Alliance	R. Burt	796	39.2	+7.9
Labour	B. Croft	219	10.8	–6.1
Majority		218	10.7	N/A
Turnout		2,029	32.3	–9.1
Registered electors		6,276		
Conservative hold		Swing	▼4.9	

=== Tarring ===
Tarring
Party	Candidate	Votes	%	±%
Conservative	S. Todd	1,090	48.5	–3.1
Alliance	V. Harvey*	975	43.4	–5.0
Labour	S. Peaty	184	8.2	N/A
Majority		115	5.1	N/A
Turnout		2,249	34.2	–10.4
Registered electors		6,582		
Conservative gain from Alliance		Swing	▲1.0	
