= 1980 Lochaber District Council election =

1980 Scottish local government election

← 1977	1 May 1980	1984 →

All 12 seats to Lochaber District Council 7 seats needed for a majority

	First party	Second party	Third party
Party	Independent	Labour	Independent Labour
Seats won	8	2	1
Seat change	▲1	▼1	▲1
Popular vote	2,444	844	498
Percentage	58.8%	20.3%	12.0%
Swing	▲14.4%	▼15.7%	New
	Fourth party
Party	Liberal
Seats won	1
Seat change	▲1
Popular vote	0
Percentage	0.0
Swing	New
Council Control before election
Independent
Council Control after election
Independent

Elections to the Lochaber District Council took place in May 1980, alongside elections to the councils of Scotland's other districts.

== Aggregate results ==
Lochaber District Election Result 1980
Party	Seats	Gains	Losses	Net gain/loss	Seats %	Votes %	Votes	+/−
Independent	8			▲1		58.8	2,444	▲14.4
Labour	2			▼1		20.3	844	▼15.7
Liberal	1	1	0	▲1		0.0	0	New
Independent Labour	1	1	0	▲1		12.0	498	New
SNP	0	0	2	▼2	0.0	8.8	367	▼7.8
