= 1977 Lochaber District Council election =

1977 Scottish local government election

← 1974	7 May 1977	1980 →

All 12 seats to Lochaber District Council 7 seats needed for a majority

	First party	Second party	Third party
Party	Independent	Labour	SNP
Seats won	7	3	2
Seat change	▼3	▲1	▲2
Popular vote	1,906	1,674	713
Percentage	44.4%	36.0%	16.6%
Swing	▼44.4%	▲27.8%	New
Council Control before election
Independent
Council Control after election
Independent

Elections to the Lochaber District Council took place in May 1977, alongside elections to the councils of Scotland's other districts.

== Aggregate results ==
Lochaber District Election Result 1977
Party	Seats	Gains	Losses	Net gain/loss	Seats %	Votes %	Votes	+/−
Independent	7			▼3		44.4	1,906	▼44.4
Labour	3			▲1		36.0	1,674	▲27.8
SNP	2			▲2		16.6	713	New
