= 1984 North East Fife District Council election =

1984 Scottish local election

Results by ward.

Elections to North East Fife District Council were held in May 1984, the same day as the other Scottish local government elections.

== Election results ==
North East Fife District Council Election Result 1984
Party	Seats	Gains	Losses	Net gain/loss	Seats %	Votes %	Votes	+/−
Alliance	10	▲5	0	▲5		45.3	11,245	▲15.7
Conservative	6	0	▼5	▼5		41.3	10,267	▼7.8
Independent	2	0	0	0		7.0	1,745	▼2.4
SNP	0	0	0	0	0.0	3.1	775	▼1.4
Labour	0	0	0	0	0.0	2.7	680	▼4.7
Other parties	0	0	0	0	0.0	0.5	133	
