= 1984 Wigtown District Council election =

1984 Scottish local government election

The 1984 Wigtown District Council election took place on 1 May 1984, alongside elections to the councils of Scotland's 53 other districts. There were 14 wards, which each elected a single member using the first-past-the-post voting system.

== Results ==
1984 Wigtown District Council election result
Party	Seats	Gains	Losses	Net gain/loss	Seats %	Votes %	Votes	+/−
Independent	13	0	1	▼1	92.9	76.1	3,649	▼23.9
SNP	1	1	0	▲1	7.1	11.4	546	New
Labour	0	0	0	Steady	0.0	8.3	397	New
Alliance	0	0	0	Steady	0.0	4.3	205	New
