= 1984 North Bedfordshire Borough Council election =

1984 UK local government election

The 1984 North Bedfordshire Borough Council election took place on 3 May 1984 to elect members of North Bedfordshire Borough Council in England. This was on the same day as other local elections.

== Summary ==
=== Election result ===
1984 North Bedfordshire Borough Council election
Party	This election			Full council			This election		
Party	Seats	Net	Seats %	Other	Total	Total %	Votes	Votes %	+/−
Conservative	8	▼1	42.1	23	31	58.5	12,155	36.9	–6.0
Labour	5	▲2	26.3	6	11	20.8	10,114	30.7	+1.0
Alliance	4	Steady	21.1	5	9	17.0	6,805	20.7	–3.7
Liberal	1	▲1	5.3	0	1	1.9	2,317	7.0	N/A
Independent	1	▼2	5.3	0	1	1.9	1,114	3.4	+0.5
SDP	0	Steady	0.0	0	0	0.0	341	1.0	N/A
Communist	0	Steady	0.0	0	0	0.0	58	0.2	+0.1
Green	0	Steady	0.0	0	0	0.0	49	0.1	N/A

== Ward results ==
=== Brickhill ===
Brickhill
Party	Candidate	Votes	%	±%
Conservative	A. Semark*	1,186	43.0	−4.5
Liberal	C. Green	1,083	39.2	+10.4
SDP	N. Hills	247	8.9	−19.9
Labour	M. Hubbard	245	8.9	−5.6
Turnout		2,761	46.3	
Conservative hold		Swing		

=== Bromham ===
Bromham
Party	Candidate	Votes	%	±%
Conservative	G. Bates*	1,216	78.2	+19.3
Alliance	E. Macrae	184	11.8	−24.0
Labour	G. Blowers	154	9.9	−6.8
Turnout		1,554	40.9	
Conservative hold		Swing		

=== Carlton ===
Carlton
Party	Candidate	Votes	%	±%
Independent	V. Brandon*	Unopposed	N/A	−61.2
Turnout		N/A	N/A	
Independent hold		Swing		

=== Castle ===
Castle
Party	Candidate	Votes	%	±%
Conservative	A. Keeling	898	42.4	−0.1
Labour	E. Grugeon	855	40.3	+12.0
Alliance	R. O'Keefe	317	15.0	−6.5
Ecology	G. Hume	49	2.3	N/A
Turnout		2,119	48.5	
Conservative hold		Swing		

=== Cauldwell ===
Cauldwell
Party	Candidate	Votes	%	±%
Labour	R. Elford*	1,479	69.8	+10.0
Conservative	R. Whatton	363	17.1	−3.5
Alliance	T. Kirby	219	10.3	−1.7
Communist	C. McCarthy	58	2.7	+0.6
Turnout		2,119	37.9	
Labour hold		Swing		

=== Clapham ===
Clapham
Party	Candidate	Votes	%	±%
Alliance	D. Osborne*	877	59.5	+24.9
Conservative	W. Martin	309	20.9	+6.7
Labour	E. Johnson	289	19.6	+2.8
Turnout		1,475	49.8	
Alliance hold		Swing		

=== De Parys ===
De Parys
Party	Candidate	Votes	%	±%
Conservative	A. Watkins*	984	49.0	−6.3
Alliance	J. Struthers	668	33.3	+5.5
Labour	Y. Anderson	357	17.8	+1.7
Turnout		2,009	36.2	
Conservative hold		Swing		

=== Eastcotts ===
Eastcotts
Party	Candidate	Votes	%	±%
Alliance	V. Fattorusso	500	54.6	+5.5
Conservative	G. Russell	416	45.4	+3.3
Turnout		916	46.2	
Alliance hold		Swing		

=== Goldington ===
Goldington
Party	Candidate	Votes	%	±%
Alliance	S. Hickman*	1,024	48.1	+2.7
Labour	J. Loxley	771	36.2	+5.7
Conservative	D. Davis	333	15.6	−5.4
Turnout		2,128	38.9	
Alliance hold		Swing		

=== Harpur ===
Harpur
Party	Candidate	Votes	%	±%
Conservative	J. Temperley*	862	50.5	+3.0
Labour	B. Anderson	678	39.7	+12.0
Alliance	M. Waters	167	9.8	−1.6
Turnout		1,707	33.8	
Conservative hold		Swing		

=== Kempston East ===
Kempston East
Party	Candidate	Votes	%	±%
Labour	D. Lewis	1,008	47.4	+13.2
Conservative	G. Gilbert*	833	39.1	−5.7
Alliance	J. Brockett	287	13.5	+1.2
Turnout		2,128	34.3	
Labour gain from Conservative		Swing		

=== Kempston West ===
Kempston West
Party	Candidate	Votes	%	±%
Conservative	M. Stupple*	782	43.5	+2.8
Labour	D. Ayris	763	42.5	+2.1
Alliance	P. Smith	317	14.0	−3.5
Turnout		1,797	33.9	
Conservative hold		Swing		

=== Kingsbrook ===
Kingsbrook
Party	Candidate	Votes	%	±%
Labour	I. Luder*	1,066	48.0	+7.5
Alliance	M. Nesbitt	892	40.2	+6.5
Conservative	M. Williams	262	11.8	−5.2
Turnout		2,220	42.9	
Labour hold		Swing		

=== Newnham ===
Newnham
Party	Candidate	Votes	%	±%
Alliance	A. Lennon*	914	48.6	+9.1
Conservative	R. Norbury	645	34.3	−4.2
Labour	H. Mitchell	323	17.2	+2.0
Turnout		1,882	48.9	
Alliance hold		Swing		

=== Putnoe ===
Putnoe
Party	Candidate	Votes	%	±%
Liberal	A. Christie	1,234	48.9	+5.2
Conservative	J. Moore*	1,024	40.6	−3.3
Labour	C. Loxley	170	6.7	−0.2
SDP	S. Wilson	94	3.7	N/A
Turnout		2,522	46.2	
Liberal gain from Conservative		Swing		

=== Queen's Park ===
Queen's Park
Party	Candidate	Votes	%	±%
Labour	M. Cotter*	1,398	67.7	+13.8
Conservative	S. Singh	461	22.3	−5.7
Alliance	G. Davis-Cooke	205	9.9	+3.2
Turnout		2,064	39.6	
Labour hold		Swing		

=== Roxton ===
Roxton
Party	Candidate	Votes	%	±%
Conservative	J. Dewar	416	54.7	N/A
Independent	W. Cutts	235	30.9	N/A
Alliance	I. Sears	110	14.5	−1.7
Turnout		761	44.0	
Conservative gain from Independent		Swing		

=== Wootton ===
Wootton
Party	Candidate	Votes	%	±%
Conservative	M. Bruce*	691	36.2	+0.1
Labour	B. Keens	558	29.2	+14.0
Conservative	J. Tait	474	24.8	N/A
Independent	S. Sanders	472	24.7	N/A
Independent	P. Quirk	407	21.3	−1.8
Alliance	A. Riley	189	9.9	+4.2
Turnout		1,911	56.2	
Conservative hold		Swing		
Labour gain from Independent		Swing		
