= 1984 East Lothian District Council election =

1984 Scottish local government election

Elections for East Lothian District Council took place on Thursday 3 May 1984, alongside elections to the councils of Scotland's various other districts.

== Ward results ==
=== Labour ===
- Musselburgh East
- Musselburgh Central
- Musselburgh South
- Musselburgh West
- Tranent North
- Tranent/Ormiston
- Carberry
- Prestonpans West
- Prestonpans East
- Gladsmuir
- Lammermuir
- Dunbar

=== Conservative ===
- Cockenzie
- Haddington
- Dirleton
- East Linton
- North Berwick
