= 1984 Badenoch and Strathspey District Council election =

1984 Scottish local government election

- 3 May 1984

All 10 seats to Badenoch and Strathspey District Council 6 seats needed for a majority

	First party	Second party
Party	Independent	SNP
Seats won	8	1
Seat change	▼2	▲1
Popular vote	0	0
Percentage	0.0%	0.0%
Swing	▼100.0%	New
Council Control before election
Independent
Council Control after election
Independent

Elections to the Badenoch and Strathspey District Council took place in May 1984, alongside elections to the councils of Scotland's other districts.

No seats were contested and one received no nominations. One Scottish National Party councillor was elected unopposed for the seat of Grantown on Spey East, the first time any party won representation on the council.

== Aggregate results ==
Badenoch and Strathspey District Election Result 1984
Party	Seats	Gains	Losses	Net gain/loss	Seats %	Votes %	Votes	+/−
Independent	8			▼2		0.0	0	▼100.0
SNP	1			▲1		0.0	0	New
Uncontested election	1			▲1		0.0	0	
