= 1984 Kincardine and Deeside District Council election =

1984 Scottish local government election

- 3 May 1984

All 12 seats to Kincardine and Deeside District Council 7 seats needed for a majority
	First party	Second party
Party	Independent	Conservative
Last election	9 seats, 62.7%	2 seats, 19.0%
Seats won	7	3
Seat change	▼2	▲1
Popular vote	3,698	1,827
Percentage	53.2%	26.3%
Swing	▼9.5%	▲7.3%
	Third party	Fourth party
Party	Alliance	SNP
Last election	1 seats, 18.3%	Did not contest
Seats won	1	1
Seat change	Steady	▲1
Popular vote	1,271	156
Percentage	18.3%	2.2%
Swing	Steady	New
- Map of ward results

- Council composition following the election

Elections to Kincardine and Deeside District Council were held on 3 May 1984, on the same day as the other Scottish local government elections. This was the fourth election to the district council following the implementation of the Local Government (Scotland) Act 1973.

The election used the 12 wards created by the Initial Statutory Reviews of Electoral Arrangements in 1980. Each ward elected one councillor using first-past-the-post voting.

== Results ==
1984 Kincardine and Deeside District Council election result
Party	Seats	Gains	Losses	Net gain/loss	Seats %	Votes %	Votes	+/−
Independent	7			▼2	58.3	53.2	3,698	▼9.5
Conservative	3			▲1	25.0	26.3	1,827	▲7.3
Alliance	1			Steady	8.3	18.3	1,271	Steady
SNP	1			▲1	8.3	2.2	156	New
