= 1984 Sutherland District Council election =

Sutherland District Council election

- 3 May 1984

All 14 seats to Sutherland District Council 8 seats needed for a majority
- Registered: 10,567
- Turnout: 66.5%
| | First party |
|---|---|
| | Ind |
| Party | Independent |
| Last election | 14 seats, 100.0% |
| Seats won | 14 |
| Seat change | Steady |
| Popular vote | 1,307 |
| Percentage | 100.0% |
| Swing | Steady |
Council Control before election
Independent
Council Control after election
Independent

Elections to Sutherland District Council were held on 3 May 1984, on the same day as the other Scottish local government elections. This was the fourth election to the district council following the local government reforms in the 1970s.

The election was the second to use the 14 wards created by the Initial Statutory Reviews of Electoral Arrangements in 1979. Each ward elected one councillor using first-past-the-post voting.

As with other elections in the Highland region, no candidates were affiliated with any political parties and the 14 councillors elected were all independents. In total, 12 of the 14 wards were uncontested.

== Results ==
1984 Sutherland District Council election result
| Party | Seats | Gains | Losses | Net gain/loss | Seats % | Votes % | Votes | +/− |
|---|---|---|---|---|---|---|---|---|
| Independent | 14 | 4 | 4 | Steady | 100.0 | 100.0 | 1,307 | Steady |

== Ward results ==
=== Dornoch Burgh ===
Dornoch Burgh
| Party | Candidate | Votes | % |
|---|---|---|---|
| Independent | R. H. MacKay | Unopposed | |
| Registered electors | | 705 | |
| Independent hold | | | |

=== Dornoch Rural ===
Dornoch Rural
| Party | Candidate | Votes | % |
|---|---|---|---|
| Independent | J. K. Bell | Unopposed | |
| Registered electors | | 871 | |
| Independent hold | | | |

=== Creich ===
Creich
| Party | Candidate | Votes | % |
|---|---|---|---|
| Independent | A. M. Gilmour | Unopposed | |
| Registered electors | | 824 | |
| Independent hold | | | |

=== Kincardine ===
Kincardine
| Party | Candidate | Votes | % |
|---|---|---|---|
| Independent | E. M. E. Munro | Unopposed | |
| Registered electors | | 533 | |
| Independent hold | | | |

=== Golspie Rural ===
Golspie Rural
| Party | Candidate | Votes | % |
|---|---|---|---|
| Independent | | Unopposed | |
| Registered electors | | | |
| Independent hold | | | |

=== Golspie ===
Golspie
| Party | Candidate | Votes | % |
|---|---|---|---|
| Independent | D. I. MacRae | 337 | 52.7 |
| Independent | I. P. Murray | 302 | 47.2 |
| Majority | | 35 | 5.5 |
| Turnout | | 639 | 69.7 |
| Registered electors | | 918 | |
| Independent hold | | | |

=== Lairg ===
Lairg
| Party | Candidate | Votes | % |
|---|---|---|---|
| Independent | N. G. MacDonald | Unopposed | |
| Registered electors | | 754 | |
| Independent gain from Independent | | | |

=== Assynt ===
Assynt
| Party | Candidate | Votes | % |
|---|---|---|---|
| Independent | I. M. MacAuley | Unopposed | |
| Registered electors | | 686 | |
| Independent gain from Independent | | | |

=== Eddrachillis and Durness ===
Eddrachillis and Durness
| Party | Candidate | Votes | % |
|---|---|---|---|
| Independent | L. MacKenzie | Unopposed | |
| Registered electors | | 811 | |
| Independent hold | | | |

=== Brora ===
Brora
| Party | Candidate | Votes | % |
|---|---|---|---|
| Independent | M. Fielding | 292 | 51.3 |
| Independent | R. MacLeod | 276 | 48.5 |
| Majority | | 16 | 2.8 |
| Turnout | | 568 | 63.2 |
| Registered electors | | 901 | |
| Independent gain from Independent | | | |

=== North Brora and Loth ===
North Brora and Loth
| Party | Candidate | Votes | % |
|---|---|---|---|
| Independent | R. R. MacDonald | Unopposed | |
| Registered electors | | 707 | |
| Independent hold | | | |

=== Helmsdale ===
Helmsdale
| Party | Candidate | Votes | % |
|---|---|---|---|
| Independent | J. O. F. MacKay | Unopposed | |
| Registered electors | | 752 | |
| Independent hold | | | |

=== Tongue ===
Tongue
| Party | Candidate | Votes | % |
|---|---|---|---|
| Independent | A. MacKenzie | Unopposed | |
| Registered electors | | 862 | |
| Independent gain from Independent | | | |

=== Strathy ===
Strathy
| Party | Candidate | Votes | % |
|---|---|---|---|
| Independent | E. B. M. Jardine | Unopposed | |
| Registered electors | | 533 | |
| Independent hold | | | |
