= 1984 Banff and Buchan District Council election =

1984 Scottish local government election

- 3 May 1984

All 18 seats to Banff and Buchan District Council 10 seats needed for a majority
- Turnout: 32.9%
	First party	Second party	Third party
Party	Independent	SNP	Conservative
Last election	12 seats, 48.7%	5 seats, 31.0%	1 seat, 11.5%
Seats won	12	5	1
Seat change	Steady	Steady	Steady
Popular vote	7,561	3,403	1,018
Percentage	55.5%	25.0%	7.5%
Swing	▲6.8%	▼6.0%	▼4.0%
- Map of ward results

- Council composition following the election

Elections to Banff and Buchan District Council were held on 3 May 1984, on the same day as the other Scottish local government elections. This was the fourth election to the district council following the implementation of the Local Government (Scotland) Act 1973.

The election used the 18 wards created by the Initial Statutory Reviews of Electoral Arrangements in 1980. Each ward elected one councillor using first-past-the-post voting.

== Results ==
1984 Banff and Buchan District Council election result
Party	Seats	Gains	Losses	Net gain/loss	Seats %	Votes %	Votes	+/−
Independent	12			Steady	66.7	55.5	7,561	▲6.8
SNP	5			Steady	27.8	25.0	3,403	▼6.0
Conservative	1			Steady	5.6	7.5	1,018	▼4.0
Labour	0	0	0	Steady	0.0	10.7	1,451	▲1.9
Alliance	0	0	0	Steady	0.0	1.4	186	New
