= 1984 Welwyn Hatfield District Council election =

Welwyn Hatfield District Council election

- 3 May 1984

14 out of 43 seats to Welwyn Hatfield District Council 22 seats needed for a majority
- Turnout: 32,912, 47.9%

	First party	Second party	Third party
Party	Labour	Conservative	Alliance
Last election	24 seats, 36.2%	19 seats, 47.3%	0 seats, 16.4%
Seats before	24	19	0
Seats after	24	19	0
Seat change	Steady	Steady	Steady
Popular vote	14,103	12,579	6,230
Percentage	42.9%	38.2%	18.9%
Swing	▲6.7	▼9.1	▲2.5

The 1984 Welwyn Hatfield District Council election took place on 3 May 1984 to elect members of Welwyn Hatfield District Council in England. This was on the same day as other local elections. While the local elections across the country saw each party's share of the popular barely change Welwyn Hatfield was an exception to this, seeing the Conservatives lose nearly a tenth of the popular vote share. However, this did not translate into any seats changing hands for any party.

== Summary ==
=== Election result ===
1984 Welwyn Hatfield District Council election
Party	This election			Full council			This election		
Party	Seats	Net	Seats %	Other	Total	Total %	Votes	Votes %	+/−
Labour	9	Steady	64.3	15	24	55.8	14,103	42.9	+6.7
Conservative	5	Steady	35.7	14	19	44.2	12,579	38.2	–9.1
Alliance	0	Steady	0.0	0	0	0.0	6,230	18.9	+2.5
