= 1984 Reading Borough Council election =

- 3 May 1984

15 seats of 45 on council 23 seats needed for a majority
	First party	Second party	Third party
	Con	Lab	Lib
Leader	Deryck Morton	Mike Orton	Basil Dunning
Party	Conservative	Labour	Liberal
Alliance			Alliance
Seats before	26	13	6
Seats after	23	17	5
Seat change	▼3	▲4	▼1
Popular vote	16,843	13,286	9,216
Percentage	42.4%	33.5%	23.2%
Swing	▼3.7%	▲3.6%	▼0.1%

The 1984 Reading Borough Council election was held on 3 May 1984, at the same time as other local elections across England and Scotland. One third of Reading Borough Council's 45 seats were up for election.

The election saw the Conservatives' majority on the council reduced to just one seat. After the election, the Conservatives had 23 seats, Labour had 17 seats, and the SDP-Liberal Alliance had 5 seats.

The leader of the Conservative group was Deryck Morton, and the leader of the Labour group was Mike Orton, both remaining in post after the election. The Liberal leader on the council prior to the election was Basil Dunning, but he was replaced immediately after the election by former leader Jim Day, who had lost his seat in 1983 but regained it at this election.

== Results ==
Reading Borough Council Election, 1984
Party	Seats	Gains	Losses	Net gain/loss	Seats %	Votes %	Votes	+/−
Conservative	6	0	3	-3	40.0	42.4	16,843	-3.7
Labour	8	4	0	+4	53.3	33.5	13,286	+3.6
Alliance	1	0	1	-1	6.7	23.2	9,216	-0.1
Ecology	0				0.0	0.9	363	+0.1

=== Ward results ===
The results in each ward were as follows (candidates with an asterisk (*) were the previous incumbent standing for re-election, candidates with a dagger (†) were sitting councillors contesting different wards):

Abbey Ward
Party	Candidate	Votes	%	±%
Labour	John Silverthorne*	1,285	57.7	+5.3
Conservative	Jerry Wray	628	28.2	−3.4
Liberal	John Riley	314	14.1	+0.8
Turnout		2,227		
Labour hold		Swing	+4.35	

Battle Ward
Party	Candidate	Votes	%	±%
Labour	Joe Bristow	927	44.5	+4.2
Conservative	George Robinson†	806	38.7	+0.9
Liberal	George Ford	281	13.5	−8.5
Ecology	Ian Cooper	69	3.3	n/a
Turnout		2,083		
Labour gain from Conservative		Swing	+1.65	

Caversham Ward
Party	Candidate	Votes	%	±%
Conservative	Pauline Palmer	1,907	64.8	−2.9
Labour	Pat Mander	720	24.4	+3.5
Liberal	Imogen Pravda	318	10.8	−0.7
Turnout		2,945		
Conservative hold		Swing	-3.2	

Church Ward
Party	Candidate	Votes	%	±%
Labour	Maureen Lockey*	1,053	49.2	+5.1
Conservative	Grace Wray	758	35.4	−1.2
Liberal	Steve Begg	328	15.3	−3.9
Turnout		2,139		
Labour hold		Swing	+3.15	

Katesgrove Ward
Party	Candidate	Votes	%	±%
Labour	Ron Williams*	1,030	50.7	+5.4
Conservative	Stephen Foley	680	33.5	−10.7
SDP	Andrew McLuskey	267	13.2	+5.4
Ecology	Mark Roberts	53	2.6	−0.1
Turnout		2,030		
Labour hold		Swing	+8.05	

Kentwood Ward
Party	Candidate	Votes	%	±%
Conservative	Stephen Thomas*	1,190	40.0	−2.6
Liberal	Tom Heydeman†	865	30.8	+2.6
Labour	Pete Watkins	704	23.6	0.0
Turnout		2,978		
Conservative hold		Swing	-2.6	

Minster Ward
Party	Candidate	Votes	%	±%
Conservative	Deryck Morton†	1,464	54.6	−4.4
Labour	Phil Armson	805	30.0	+4.0
SDP	Alan Jackson	411	15.3	+0.4
Turnout		2,680		
Conservative hold		Swing	-4.2	

Norcot Ward
Party	Candidate	Votes	%	±%
Labour	Helen Hathaway	1,024	40.8	+7.7
Liberal	Joyce Wicks	1,008	40.2	+0.3
Conservative	Dharam Ahuja	476	19.0	−8.0
Turnout		2,508		
Labour gain from Liberal		Swing	+4.0	

Park Ward
Party	Candidate	Votes	%	±%
Labour	Martin Salter	1,388	44.2	+9.7
Conservative	Simon Oliver*	1,211	38.5	−1.1
SDP	Rod Campbell	424	13.5	−8.5
Ecology	Philip Unsworth	120	3.8	−0.1
Turnout		3,143		
Labour gain from Conservative		Swing	+5.4	

Peppard Ward
Party	Candidate	Votes	%	±%
Conservative	Mary Irwin*	1,859	62.6	+3.8
SDP	Clive Jones	717	24.1	−8.0
Labour	Gerald (Bob) Scott	394	13.3	+4.2
Turnout		2,970		
Conservative hold		Swing	+5.9	

Redlands Ward
Party	Candidate	Votes	%	±%
Labour	Robert Dimmick	1,053	37.3	+5.7
Conservative	Martin Lower*	963	34.1	−4.3
SDP	Howard Rodaway	687	24.3	−2.7
Ecology	Chris Parr	121	4.3	+1.4
Turnout		2,824		
Labour gain from Conservative		Swing	+5.0	

Southcote Ward
Party	Candidate	Votes	%	±%
Conservative	Jack Irwin*	1,307	45.7	−5.8
Labour	Norma Sinclair	951	33.3	+1.6
SDP	Charles Bond	599	21.0	+4.2
Turnout		2,857		
Conservative hold		Swing	-5.0	

Thames Ward
Party	Candidate	Votes	%	±%
Conservative	Pam Fuad	2,045	60.3	−6.5
Liberal	Martyn Allies	935	27.6	+5.8
Labour	Phil Hingley	411	12.1	+0.6
Turnout		3,391		
Conservative hold		Swing	-6.15	

Tilehurst Ward
Party	Candidate	Votes	%	±%
Liberal	Jim Day	1,681	55.1	+8.4
Conservative	Pat Layton	993	32.6	−7.0
Labour	Jim Toner	376	12.3	−0.9
Turnout		3,050		
Liberal hold		Swing	+7.7	

Whitley Ward
Party	Candidate	Votes	%	±%
Labour	Tony Jones	1,165	61.9	+2.8
Conservative	Jack Cleminson	556	29.5	−0.6
SDP	Sean O'Connell	162	8.6	−2.2
Turnout		1,883		
Labour hold		Swing	+1.7	

== By-elections 1984–1986 ==
=== Church by-election 1984 ===
Church By-Election 6 December 1984
Party	Candidate	Votes	%	±%
Labour	Kay Everett	909	52.0	+2.7
Conservative	Grace Wray	439	25.1	−10.3
Liberal	Steve Begg	401	22.9	+7.6
Majority		470	26.9	
Turnout		1,749	26.5	
Labour hold		Swing	+6.5	

The Church ward by-election in 1984 was triggered by the resignation of Labour councillor Dave Absolom.

=== Battle by-election 1985 ===
Battle By-Election 25 July 1985
Party	Candidate	Votes	%	±%
Labour	Clive Chandler	908	43.3	−1.2
SDP	Clive Jones	719	34.3	+20.8
Conservative	Sue White	421	20.1	−18.6
Majority		189	9.0	
Turnout		2,097	31.5	
Labour hold		Swing	-11.0	

The Battle ward by-election in 1985 was triggered by the death of Labour councillor Joe Bristow.
