= 1984 Waveney District Council election =

1984 English local government election

- 3 May 1984

All 48 seats to Waveney District Council 25 seats needed for a majority

	First party	Second party
Party	Conservative	Labour
Seats won	5	9
Seats after	26	19
Seat change	▼1	▲2
Popular vote	9,344	11,619
Percentage	36.6%	45.5%
Swing	▼5.1%	▲5.1%
	Third party	Fourth party
Party	Alliance	Independent
Seats won	2	1
Seats after	2	1
Seat change	Steady	▼1
Popular vote	3,683	903
Percentage	14.4%	3.5%
Swing	▲3.6%	▼3.3%
- Winner of each seat at the 1984 Waveney District Council election.
Control before election
Conservative
Control after election
Conservative

The 1984 Waveney District Council election took place on 3 May 1984 to elect members of Waveney District Council in Suffolk, England. This was on the same day as other local elections.

== Summary ==
=== Election result ===
1984 Waveney District Council election
Party	This election			Full council			This election		
Party	Seats	Net	Seats %	Other	Total	Total %	Votes	Votes %	+/−
Conservative	5	▼1	29.4	21	26	54.2	9,344	36.6	–5.1
Labour	9	▲2	52.9	10	19	39.6	11,619	45.5	+5.1
Alliance	2	Steady	11.8	0	2	4.2	3,683	14.4	+3.6
Independent	1	▼1	5.9	0	1	2.1	903	3.5	–3.3

== Ward results ==
Incumbent councillors standing for re-election are marked with an asterisk (*). Changes in seats do not take into account by-elections or defections.

=== Beccles Town ===
Beccles Town
Party	Candidate	Votes	%	±%
Conservative	E. Stepehen	819	43.9	
Labour	A. Hutchinson	741	39.7	
Alliance	J. Versey	306	16.4	
Majority		78	4.2	
Turnout		1,866	35.2	
Registered electors		5,306		
Conservative hold				

=== Beccles Worlingham ===
Beccles Worlingham
Party	Candidate	Votes	%	±%
Labour	J. Yates	491	39.5	
Conservative	E. Gallant*	469	37.7	
Alliance	A. Barratt	283	22.8	
Majority		22	1.8	
Turnout		1,243	36.7	
Registered electors		3,391		
Labour gain from Conservative				

=== Bungay ===
Bungay
Party	Candidate	Votes	%	±%
Alliance	C. Richardson*	Unopposed		
Registered electors		3,320		
Alliance hold				

=== Carlton ===
Carlton
Party	Candidate	Votes	%	±%
Conservative	L. Willert	961	58.8	
Labour	G. Strachan	455	27.8	
Alliance	B. Parrent-Baxter	218	13.3	
Majority		506	31.0	
Turnout		1,634	30.4	
Registered electors		5,375		
Conservative hold				

=== Carlton Colville ===
Carlton Colville
Party	Candidate	Votes	%	±%
Independent	J. Mitchell*	659	67.5	
Labour	A. Allerton	318	32.5	
Majority		341	34.9	
Turnout		977	31.9	
Registered electors		3,066		
Independent hold				

=== Gunton ===
Gunton
Party	Candidate	Votes	%	±%
Conservative	J. Aldous*	1,074	52.4	
Labour	M. Ramsay	615	30.0	
Alliance	J. Stannard	359	17.5	
Majority		459	22.4	
Turnout		2,048	39.8	
Registered electors		5,143		
Conservative hold				

=== Halesworth ===
Halesworth
Party	Candidate	Votes	%	±%
Labour	E. Leverett*	785	68.5	
Alliance	W. Wegg	361	31.5	
Majority		424	37.0	
Turnout		1,146	36.8	
Registered electors		3,118		
Labour hold				

=== Harbour ===
Harbour
Party	Candidate	Votes	%	±%
Labour	S. Milne	845	64.9	
Conservative	R. Lee	458	35.1	
Majority		387	29.7	
Turnout		1,303	33.1	
Registered electors		3,932		
Labour gain from Alliance				

=== Kessingland ===
Kessingland
Party	Candidate	Votes	%	±%
Labour	R. Saunders	633	45.2	
Conservative	M. Read	622	44.4	
Alliance	R. Jenner	146	10.4	
Majority		11	0.8	
Turnout		1,401	41.4	
Registered electors		3,385		
Labour gain from Independent				

=== Kirkley ===
Kirkley
Party	Candidate	Votes	%	±%
Alliance	B. Pointon	1,030	56.6	
Labour	A. Jurd*	791	43.4	
Majority		239	13.1	
Turnout		1,821	41.6	
Registered electors		4,379		
Alliance gain from Labour				

=== Normanston ===
Normanston
Party	Candidate	Votes	%	±%
Labour	J. Reynolds*	Unopposed		
Registered electors		4,605		
Labour hold				

=== Oulton Broad ===
Oulton Broad
Party	Candidate	Votes	%	±%
Conservative	E. Back	1,152	54.6	
Labour	V. Rigby	659	31.2	
Alliance	R. Carter	298	14.1	
Majority		493	23.4	
Turnout		2,109	41.4	
Registered electors		5,092		
Conservative hold				

=== Pakefield ===
Pakefield
Party	Candidate	Votes	%	±%
Labour	G. Collins	998	46.7	
Conservative	B. Harvey	800	37.5	
Alliance	G. Carroll	338	15.8	
Majority		198	9.3	
Turnout		2,136	42.3	
Registered electors		5,048		
Labour gain from Conservative				

=== Southwold ===
Southwold
Party	Candidate	Votes	%	±%
Conservative	J. Goldsmith	1,358	52.7	
Labour	A. Child*	977	37.9	
Independent	M. Mack	244	9.5	
Majority		381	14.8	
Turnout		2,579	50.4	
Registered electors		5,121		
Conservative gain from Labour				

=== St. Margarets ===
St. Margarets (2 seats due to by-election)
Party	Candidate	Votes	%	±%
Labour	N. Owen	1,118	52.5	
Labour	L. Owen	1,055	49.6	
Conservative	D. Collins	669	31.4	
Conservative	R. Wright	577	27.1	
Alliance	D. Tregloyne	344	16.1	
Turnout		~2,130	40.0	
Registered electors		5,325		
Labour hold				
Labour hold				

=== Whitton ===
Whitton
Party	Candidate	Votes	%	±%
Labour	M. Ayers*	1,138	74.7	
Conservative	D. Harvey	385	25.3	
Majority		753	49.4	
Turnout		1,523	34.1	
Registered electors		4,466		
Labour hold				

== By-elections ==
=== Carlton ===
Carlton by-election: 26 September 1985
Party	Candidate	Votes	%	±%
Conservative		594	39.1	
Alliance		541	35.6	
Labour		383	25.2	
Majority		53	3.5	
Turnout		1,518	28.4	
Registered electors		5,345		
Conservative hold		Swing		

=== Wainford ===
Wainford by-election: 26 September 1985
Party	Candidate	Votes	%	±%
Conservative		161	40.3	
Labour		127	31.8	
Independent		112	28.0	
Majority		34	8.5	
Turnout		400	32.4	
Registered electors		1,235		
Conservative hold		Swing		
