= 1984 West Lothian District Council election =

1984 Scottish local government election

- 3 May 1984

All 24 seats to West Lothian District Council 13 seats needed for a majority
	First party	Second party
Party	Labour	SNP
Last election	15 seats, 50.1%	4 seats, 33.8%
Seats won	19	2
Seat change	▲4	▼2
Popular vote	26,028	11,150
Percentage	56.1%	24.1%
Swing	▲6.0%	▼9.7%
	Third party	Fourth party
Party	Ratepayers	Independent
Last election	Did not contest	2 seats, 8.2%
Seats won	2	1
Seat change	▲2	▼1
Popular vote	2,179	2,222
Percentage	4.7%	4.8%
Swing	New	▼3.4%
- Map of ward results

- Council composition following the election

Elections to West Lothian District Council were held on 3 May 1984, on the same day as the other Scottish local government elections. This was the fourth election to the district council following the implementation of the Local Government (Scotland) Act 1973.

The election used the 24 wards created by the Initial Statutory Reviews of Electoral Arrangements in 1980. Each ward elected one councillor using first-past-the-post voting.

== Results ==
1984 West Lothian District Council election result
Party	Seats	Gains	Losses	Net gain/loss	Seats %	Votes %	Votes	+/−
Labour	19			▲4	79.2	56.1	26,028	▲6.0
SNP	2			▼2	8.3	24.1	11,150	▼9.7
Ind. Ratepayers	2			▲2	8.3	4.6	2,137	New
Independent	1	0	0	▼1	4.2	4.8	2,222	▼3.4
Conservative	0	0	0	Steady	0.0	6.3	2,899	▲1.7
Alliance	0	0	0	Steady	0.0	3.7	1,728	▲1.0
Communist	0	0	0	Steady	0.0	0.3	152	▼0.4
Ratepayers	0	0	0	Steady	0.0	0.1	42	New
