= 1984 Leicester City Council election =

1984 English local election

The 1984 Leicester City Council election took place on 3 May 1984 to elect members of Leicester City Council in England. This was on the same day as other local elections.

== Summary ==
1984 Leicester City Council election
Party	This election			Full council			This election		
Party	Seats	Net	Seats %	Other	Total	Total %	Votes	Votes %	+/−
Labour	15	▲2	78.9	27	42	75.0	31,128	55.9	+6.9
Conservative	4	▼2	21.1	10	14	25.0	20,338	36.5	–1.5
Alliance	0	Steady	0.0	0	0	0.0	3,805	6.8	–4.6
Independent	0	Steady	0.0	0	0	0.0	236	0.4	+0.3
Ecology	0	Steady	0.0	0	0	0.0	225	0.4	+0.2
