= 1984 St Albans City and District Council election =

1984 English local election

The 1984 St Albans City and District Council election took place on 3 May 1984 to elect members of St Albans City and District Council in England. This was on the same day as other local elections.

Following the election, the council fell into No overall control, with the Conservatives forming the largest group.

== Summary ==
1984 St Albans City and District Council election
Party	This election			Full council			This election		
Party	Seats	Net	Seats %	Other	Total	Total %	Votes	Votes %	+/−
Conservative	8	▼5	36.4	17	25	43.9	22,103	41.2	–6.2
Alliance	11	▲6	50.0	12	23	40.4	22,149	41.3	+8.6
Labour	2	▼2	9.1	5	7	12.3	8,338	15.5	–1.3
Independent	1	▲1	4.5	1	2	3.5	920	1.7	–1.1
Ecology	0	Steady	0.0	0	0	0.0	117	0.2	–0.1

== Ward results ==
=== Ashley ===
Ashley (2 seats due to by-election)
Party	Candidate	Votes	%
Alliance	B. Rigby	1,579	58.3
Alliance	J. Hurd	1,456	53.7
Conservative	D. Evans	744	27.5
Conservative	M. Dance	706	26.1
Labour	D. McCarthy	385	14.2
Labour	C. Leet	349	12.9
Turnout		2,709	56.4
Registered electors		4,804	
Alliance hold			
Alliance hold			

=== Batchwood ===
Batchwood
Party	Candidate	Votes	%	±%
Alliance	N. Lamb	852	36.3	+3.5
Conservative	R. Moss	762	32.5	+0.9
Labour	J. Ramsden*	733	31.2	–4.4
Majority		90	3.8	N/A
Turnout		2,347	46.9	–8.0
Registered electors		4,797		
Alliance gain from Labour		Swing	▲1.3	

=== Clarence ===
Clarence
Party	Candidate	Votes	%	±%
Conservative	R. Wheeldon*	1,191	46.2	+0.6
Alliance	B. Bird	1,030	39.9	–4.0
Labour	T. Skinner	359	13.9	+3.5
Majority		161	6.2	+4.5
Turnout		2,580	58.3	–2.2
Registered electors		4,426		
Conservative hold		Swing	▲2.3	

=== Colney Heath ===
Colney Heath
Party	Candidate	Votes	%	±%
Alliance	P. Hughes*	923	62.1	+14.6
Conservative	J. Jeffrey	457	30.7	–10.9
Labour	N. Ord	107	7.2	–3.7
Majority		466	31.3	N/A
Turnout		1,487	51.6	+0.5
Registered electors		2,880		
Alliance hold		Swing	▲12.8	

=== Cunningham ===
Cunningham
Party	Candidate	Votes	%	±%
Alliance	R. Donald*	1,468	59.1	+13.1
Conservative	C. Ellis	679	27.4	–8.0
Labour	M. Fletcher	335	13.5	–5.1
Majority		789	31.8	+21.2
Turnout		2,482	52.4	–4.1
Registered electors		4,735		
Alliance hold		Swing	▲10.6	

=== Harpenden East ===
Harpenden East
Party	Candidate	Votes	%	±%
Alliance	A. Stevens	1,218	45.5	+20.1
Conservative	M. Morrell*	1,213	45.4	+3.6
Labour	T. Morris	243	9.1	+1.2
Majority		5	0.1	N/A
Turnout		2,674	52.3	–0.4
Registered electors		5,108		
Alliance gain from Conservative		Swing	▲8.3	

No Independent candidate as previous (25.0%).

=== Harpenden North ===
Harpenden North
Party	Candidate	Votes	%	±%
Conservative	M. Purkiss	1,329	52.0	–8.3
Alliance	V. Salter	825	32.3	+6.6
Labour	D. Crew	285	11.2	+1.6
Ecology	H. Swailes	117	4.6	+0.1
Majority		504	19.7	–14.9
Turnout		2,556	42.6	–6.4
Registered electors		5,772		
Conservative hold		Swing	▼7.5	

=== Harpenden South ===
Harpenden South
Party	Candidate	Votes	%	±%
Conservative	G. Martyn	1,424	66.7	–0.4
Alliance	P. Jones	491	23.0	–2.1
Labour	K. Griffin	221	7.5	+2.5
Majority		933	43.7	+1.7
Turnout		2,086	42.2	–6.3
Registered electors		5,060		
Conservative hold		Swing	▲0.9	

=== Harpenden West ===
Harpenden West
Party	Candidate	Votes	%	±%
Conservative	N. Tarry*	1,333	58.7	–7.3
Alliance	J. Glendinning	766	33.7	+9.6
Labour	K. Griffin	171	7.5	–2.4
Majority		567	25.0	–16.9
Turnout		2,270	48.3	–0.8
Registered electors		5,182		
Conservative hold		Swing	▼8.5	

=== London Colney ===
London Colney
Party	Candidate	Votes	%	±%
Labour	M. Macmillan*	1,136	60.2	+8.4
Conservative	J. Kalaher	751	39.8	+5.4
Majority		385	20.4	+3.0
Turnout		1,887	34.4	–10.2
Registered electors		5,481		
Labour hold		Swing	▲1.5	

No Alliance candidate as previous (13.8%).

=== Marshallwick North ===
Marshallwick North
Party	Candidate	Votes	%	±%
Alliance	P. Halpin	1,311	49.3	+9.7
Conservative	A. Maclennan	1,109	41.7	–7.7
Labour	B. York	241	9.1	–1.9
Majority		202	7.6	N/A
Turnout		2,661	54.6	–3.4
Registered electors		4,872		
Alliance gain from Conservative		Swing	▲8.7	

=== Marshallwick South ===
Marshallwick South
Party	Candidate	Votes	%	±%
Conservative	J. Turner*	1,326	49.1	–8.8
Alliance	A. Rowlands	1,126	41.7	+10.9
Labour	A. Goodsall	249	9.2	–2.1
Majority		200	7.4	–19.7
Turnout		2,701	52.2	–3.0
Registered electors		5,117		
Conservative hold		Swing	▼9.9	

=== Park Street ===
Park Street
Party	Candidate	Votes	%	±%
Alliance	G. Bliss	1,196	55.0	+8.1
Conservative	R. Scranage*	767	35.3	–5.4
Labour	M. Rogers	211	9.7	–2.7
Majority		429	19.7	N/A
Turnout		2,174	51.2	–3.5
Registered electors		4,245		
Alliance gain from Conservative		Swing	▲6.8	

=== Redbourn ===
Redbourn
Party	Candidate	Votes	%	±%
Independent	S. Bailey*	920	43.2	N/A
Conservative	E. Lee	881	41.4	–10.7
Labour	R. Dunham	329	15.4	–0.5
Majority		39	1.8	N/A
Turnout		2,130	47.2	–3.9
Registered electors		4,510		
Independent hold		Swing	N/A	

No Alliance candidate as previous (32.0%).

=== Sopwell ===
Sopwell
Party	Candidate	Votes	%	±%
Labour	P. Harris	958	45.1	–1.7
Alliance	G. Heaton	585	27.5	–0.2
Conservative	M. Ward	583	27.4	+1.9
Majority		373	17.5	–1.6
Turnout		2,126	45.7	–3.6
Registered electors		4,652		
Labour hold		Swing	▼0.8	

=== St. Peters ===
St. Peters
Party	Candidate	Votes	%	±%
Alliance	S. Walkington	1,110	47.5	+8.1
Labour	P. Fowler*	614	26.3	+0.6
Conservative	P. Welch	614	26.3	–8.6
Majority		496	21.2	+16.7
Turnout		2,338	52.7	+1.6
Registered electors		4,435		
Alliance gain from Labour		Swing	▲3.8	

=== St. Stephens ===
St. Stephens (3 seats due to by-election)
Party	Candidate	Votes	%
Alliance	D. Parry	1,465	46.7
Conservative	A. Newell*	1,354	43.2
Conservative	M. Heap	1,280	40.8
Alliance	M. Moore	1,207	38.5
Conservative	G. Russell	1,195	38.1
Alliance	M. Hutchens	1,142	36.4
Labour	R. Mitchell	316	10.1
Labour	J. Churcher	305	9.7
Labour	S. Noble	302	9.6
Turnout		3,134	54.9
Registered electors		5,709	
Alliance gain from Conservative			
Conservative hold			
Conservative hold			

=== Verulam ===
Verulam
Party	Candidate	Votes	%	±%
Conservative	N. Woodsmith	1,492	49.9	–3.5
Alliance	J. Gunner	1,220	40.8	+0.4
Labour	S. Page	278	9.3	+3.1
Majority		272	9.1	–3.9
Turnout		2,990	57.9	–4.8
Registered electors		5,163		
Conservative hold		Swing	▼2.0	

=== Wheathampstead ===
Wheathampstead
Party	Candidate	Votes	%	±%
Alliance	D. Whittaker	1,179	51.2	N/A
Conservative	Z. Swire	913	39.6	–45.4
Labour	J. Brown	211	9.2	–5.8
Majority		266	11.6	N/A
Turnout		2,303	48.5	–1.1
Registered electors		4,749		
Alliance gain from Conservative		Swing	N/A	
