= 1984 Rochford District Council election =

1984 English local election

- 3 May 1984

15 out of 40 seats to Rochford District Council 21 seats needed for a majority

	First party	Second party	Third party
Party	Conservative	Alliance	Labour
Seats won	12	2	1
Seats after	27	8	2
Seat change	▲1	▲2	▼1
Popular vote	8,457	4,882	3,080
Percentage	50.5%	29.1%	18.4%
Swing	▼1.7%	▼5.1%	▲6.5%
	Fourth party	Fifth party
Party	Independent	Residents
Seats won	0	0
Seats after	2	1
Seat change	Steady	▼2
Popular vote	340	did not stand
Percentage	2.0%	did not stand
Swing	N/A	N/A
Council control before election
Conservative
Council control after election
Conservative

The 1984 Rochford District Council election took place on 3 May 1984 to elect members of Rochford District Council in Essex, England. This was on the same day as other local elections.

== Summary ==
=== Election result ===
1984 Rochford District Council election
Party	This election			Full council			This election		
Party	Seats	Net	Seats %	Other	Total	Total %	Votes	Votes %	+/−
Conservative	12	▲1	80.0	15	27	67.5	8,457	50.5	–1.7
Alliance	2	▲2	13.3	6	8	20.0	4,882	29.1	–5.1
Labour	1	▼1	6.7	1	2	5.0	3,080	18.4	+6.5
Independent	0	Steady	0.0	2	2	5.0	340	2.0	N/A
Residents	0	▼2	0.0	1	1	2.5	N/A	N/A	N/A

== Ward results ==
Incumbent councillors standing for re-election are marked with an asterisk (*).

=== Ashingdon ===
Ashingdon
Party	Candidate	Votes	%	±%
Conservative	T. Fawell*	527	54.1	+10.0
Alliance	D. Johnson	447	45.9	+1.6
Majority		80	8.2	N/A
Turnout		974	42.1	–3.3
Registered electors		2,316		
Conservative hold		Swing	▲4.2	

=== Downhall ===
Downhall
Party	Candidate	Votes	%	±%
Alliance	C. Black	651	56.0	+27.7
Conservative	S. Fletcher	512	44.0	–18.4
Majority		139	12.0	N/A
Turnout		1,163	44.4	+4.7
Registered electors		2,621		
Alliance gain from Conservative		Swing	▲23.1	

=== Grange & Rawreth ===
Grange & Rawreth
Party	Candidate	Votes	%	±%
Alliance	P. Beckers	570	37.3	+0.8
Conservative	N. Hill	507	33.2	–10.7
Labour	S. Cox	450	29.5	+9.9
Majority		63	4.1	N/A
Turnout		1,527	34.9	–2.1
Registered electors		4,381		
Alliance gain from Conservative		Swing	▲5.7	

=== Hawkwell East ===
Hawkwell East
Party	Candidate	Votes	%	±%
Conservative	T. Burt	904	69.6	+10.1
Labour	D. Orrock	395	30.4	+10.3
Majority		509	39.2	+0.2
Turnout		1,299	28.3	–5.3
Registered electors		4,585		
Conservative hold		Swing	▼0.1	

=== Hawkwell West ===
Hawkwell West
Party	Candidate	Votes	%	±%
Conservative	L. Holdich	510	50.0	–1.8
Alliance	K. Saunders	306	30.0	+3.6
Labour	G. Plackett	204	20.0	–1.8
Majority		204	20.0	–5.4
Turnout		1,020	34.6	–1.4
Registered electors		2,951		
Conservative hold		Swing	▼2.7	

=== Hockley Central ===
Hockley Central
Party	Candidate	Votes	%	±%
Conservative	E. Hart	356	52.0	–25.0
Alliance	M. Fowler	246	35.9	+12.9
Labour	R. Ellis	83	12.1	N/A
Majority		110	16.1	–37.9
Turnout		685	42.5	+6.8
Registered electors		1,612		
Conservative hold		Swing	▼19.0	

=== Hockley East ===
Hockley East (2 seats due to by-election)
Party	Candidate	Votes	%	±%
Conservative	M. Anderson	824	57.5	+7.2
Conservative	K. Banks	766	53.5	+3.2
Alliance	A. Eden	607	42.4	N/A
Alliance	M. Nudd	536	37.4	N/A
Turnout		~1,432	43.2	+0.6
Registered electors		3,314		
Conservative gain from Residents				
Conservative hold				

=== Hockley West ===
Hockley West
Party	Candidate	Votes	%	±%
Conservative	J. Jones*	640	75.2	+8.3
Alliance	D. Miles	211	24.8	–8.3
Majority		429	50.4	+16.6
Turnout		851	28.8	–22.5
Registered electors		2,951		
Conservative hold		Swing	▲5.3	

=== Hullbridge Riverside ===
Hullbridge Riverside
Party	Candidate	Votes	%	±%
Conservative	J. Parkinson	351	36.9	+1.2
Labour	C. Morgan	342	36.0	+8.1
Alliance	G. Skinner	258	27.1	–9.2
Majority		9	0.9	N/A
Turnout		951	32.8	–2.8
Registered electors		2,900		
Conservative gain from Labour		Swing	▼3.5	

=== Hullbridge South ===
Hullbridge South (by-election)
Party	Candidate	Votes	%	±%
Conservative	L. Walker	296	37.0	+8.5
Labour	D. Richardson	274	34.3	+16.7
Alliance	M. Menning	229	28.7	+3.4
Majority		22	2.8	N/A
Turnout		799	35.0	–7.9
Registered electors		2,282		
Conservative gain from Residents		Swing	▼4.1	

=== Lodge ===
Lodge
Party	Candidate	Votes	%	±%
Conservative	J. Panniers-Taylor	794	48.8	–12.5
Alliance	M. Handford	663	40.7	+15.2
Labour	F. Denny	171	10.5	–2.6
Majority		131	8.0	–27.8
Turnout		1,628	35.1	–5.7
Registered electors		4,638		
Conservative hold		Swing	▼13.9	

=== Rayleigh Central ===
Rayleigh Central
Party	Candidate	Votes	%	±%
Conservative	C. Gardner	392	39.7	–2.0
Independent	S. Silva	340	34.4	+4.0
Alliance	B. Howey	158	16.0	–3.8
Labour	M. Doddimead	97	9.8	+1.7
Majority		52	5.3	–6.0
Turnout		987	34.0	–10.3
Registered electors		2,907		
Conservative hold		Swing	▼3.0	

=== Rochford St Andrews ===
Rochford St Andrews (2 seats due to by-election)
Party	Candidate	Votes	%	±%
Conservative	D. Wade	546	51.0	+9.1
Labour	D. Weir	543	50.7	+15.5
Conservative	B. Gooding	532	49.7	+7.8
Labour	M. Weir	521	48.6	+13.4
Turnout		~1,071	47.2	+6.8
Registered electors		2,270		
Conservative hold				
Labour hold				
