= 1984 Inverness District Council election =

1984 Scottish local government election

- 3 May 1984

All 28 seats to Inverness District Council 15 seats needed for a majority

	First party	Second party	Third party
Party	Independent	Labour	Liberal
Seats won	18	8	2
Seat change	▲1	0	0
Popular vote	6,073	2,752	649
Percentage	61.3%	27.8%	6.6%
Swing	▼9.1%	▲5.1%	▲6.6%
Council Control before election
Independent
Council Control after election
Independent

Elections to the Inverness District Council took place in May 1984, alongside elections to the councils of Scotland's other districts.

== Aggregate results ==
Inverness District Election Result 1984
Party	Seats	Gains	Losses	Net gain/loss	Seats %	Votes %	Votes	+/−
Independent	18	▲1	0	▲1		61.3	6,073	▼9.1
Labour	8	0	0	0		27.8	2,752	▲5.1
Liberal	2	0	0	0		6.6	649	▲6.6
Conservative	0	0	0	0	0.0	2.4	235	New
Independent Liberal	0	0	0	0	0.0	1.9	190	New
