= 1984 Tweeddale District Council election =

1984 Scottish local government election

- 3 May 1984

All 10 seats to Tweeddale District Council 6 seats needed for a majority
	First party
Party	Independent
Last election	10 seats, 100.0%
Seats won	10
Seat change	Steady
Popular vote	1,940
Percentage	100.0%
Swing	Steady

Elections to the Tweeddale District Council took place on 3 May 1984, alongside elections to the councils of Scotland's 53 other districts. There were 10 wards, which each elected a single member using the first-past-the-post voting system.

== Results ==
1984 Tweeddale District Council election result
Party	Seats	Gains	Losses	Net gain/loss	Seats %	Votes %	Votes	+/−
Independent	10	0	0	Steady	100.0	100.0	1,940	Steady
