= 1984 Lochaber District Council election =

1984 Scottish local government election

← 1980	3 May 1984	1988 →

All 15 seats to Lochaber District Council 8 seats needed for a majority

	First party	Second party	Third party
Party	Independent	Labour	Independent Labour
Seats won	8	5	2
Seat change	0	▲3	▲1
Popular vote	1,790	704	566
Percentage	58.5%	23.0%	18.5%
Swing	▼0.3%	▲2.7%	▲6.5%
Council Control before election
Independent
Council Control after election
Independent

Elections to the Lochaber District Council took place in May 1984, alongside elections to the councils of Scotland's other districts.

== Aggregate results ==
Lochaber District Election Result 1984
Party	Seats	Gains	Losses	Net gain/loss	Seats %	Votes %	Votes	+/−
Independent	8			0		58.5	1,790	▼0.3
Labour	5			▲3		23.0	704	▲2.7
Independent Labour	2			▲1		18.5	566	▲6.5
