= 1984 Hertsmere Borough Council election =

1984 English local election

- 3 May 1984

14 out of 39 seats to Hertsmere Borough Council 20 seats needed for a majority
- Registered: 46,648
- Turnout: 42.0% (▼6.4%)

	First party	Second party	Third party
Party	Conservative	Labour	Alliance
Seats won	9	3	2
Seats after	23	12	4
Seat change	▲2	Steady	▼2
Popular vote	11,078	4,835	5,135
Percentage	52.6%	23.0%	24.4%
Swing	▲8.1%	▼7.9%	▼0.1%
- Winner of each seat at the 1984 Hertsmere Borough Council election. Wards in white were not contested.
Control before election
Conservative
Control after election
Conservative

The 1984 Hertsmere Borough Council election took place on 3 May 1984 to elect members of Hertsmere Borough Council in Hertfordshire, England. This was on the same day as other local elections.

== Summary ==
=== Election result ===
1984 Hertsmere Borough Council election
Party	This election				Full council			This election		
Party	Candidates	Seats	Net	Seats %	Other	Total	Total %	Votes	Votes %	+/−
Conservative	{{{candidates}}}	9	▲2	64.3	14	23	59.0	11,078	52.6	+8.1
Labour	{{{candidates}}}	3	Steady	21.4	9	12	30.8	4,835	23.0	–7.9
Alliance	{{{candidates}}}	2	▼2	14.3	2	4	10.3	5,135	24.4	–0.1

== Ward results ==
Incumbent councillors standing for re-election are marked with an asterisk (*). Changes in seats do not take into account by-elections or defections.

=== Aldenham West ===
Aldenham West
Party	Candidate	Votes	%	±%
Conservative	A. Jefferis	894	53.7	–6.8
Labour	A. Bell	418	25.1	+2.2
Alliance	E. Gadsden	354	21.2	+4.6
Majority		476	28.6	+9.0
Turnout		1,666	45.9	–6.1
Registered electors		3,630		
Conservative hold		Swing	▼4.5	

=== Cowley ===
Cowley
Party	Candidate	Votes	%	±%
Labour	P. Roach	764	73.7	+13.3
Conservative	P. Banton	273	26.3	–0.4
Majority		491	47.4	+13.7
Turnout		1,037	27.1	–10.2
Registered electors		3,827		
Labour hold		Swing	▲6.9	

=== Heath North ===
Heath North
Party	Candidate	Votes	%	±%
Conservative	B. Batten	895	57.4	+2.4
Alliance	C. Hardy	533	34.2	–10.8
Labour	A. Sharpe	131	8.4	N/A
Majority		362	23.2	+13.2
Turnout		1,559	41.6	–11.1
Registered electors		3,748		
Conservative hold		Swing	▲6.6	

=== Heath South ===
Heath South
Party	Candidate	Votes	%	±%
Conservative	P. Riches*	987	63.7	–5.1
Alliance	R. Hardy	461	29.7	–1.5
Labour	P. Evans	102	6.6	N/A
Majority		526	33.9	–3.6
Turnout		1,550	41.4	–0.8
Registered electors		3,744		
Conservative hold		Swing	▼1.8	

=== Hillside ===
Hillside
Party	Candidate	Votes	%	±%
Labour	J. Kentish*	650	54.7	+3.7
Conservative	A. Gattward	388	32.6	–2.2
Alliance	C. Shenton	151	12.7	–1.5
Majority		262	22.1	+5.9
Turnout		1,189	34.5	–6.8
Registered electors		3,446		
Labour hold		Swing	▲3.0	

=== Lyndhurst ===
Lyndhurst
Party	Candidate	Votes	%	±%
Labour	E. Lindsey*	661	48.0	+6.4
Conservative	I. Hirshfield	562	40.8	+2.1
Alliance	L. Reefe	155	11.2	–8.5
Majority		99	7.2	+4.3
Turnout		1,378	41.8	–7.7
Registered electors		3,297		
Labour hold		Swing	▲2.2	

=== Potters Bar Central ===
Potters Bar Central
Party	Candidate	Votes	%	±%
Conservative	P. Spratt	685	48.0	+0.5
Alliance	D. Martin	573	40.2	–3.6
Labour	M. Grace	168	11.8	+3.2
Majority		112	7.8	N/A
Turnout		1,426	45.6	–8.6
Registered electors		3,127		
Conservative gain from Alliance		Swing	▲2.1	

=== Potters Bar East ===
Potters Bar East (2 seats due to by-election)
Party	Candidate	Votes	%	±%
Conservative	D. Ferguson	1,098	54.0	–2.6
Conservative	H. Spratt*	1,006	49.5	–7.1
Labour	D. Banks	521	25.6	+9.7
Labour	H. Vaylor	444	21.8	+5.9
Alliance	G. Pearce	415	20.4	–7.1
Turnout		~2,034	41.7	–6.2
Registered electors		4,878		
Conservative hold				
Conservative hold				

=== Potters Bar North ===
Potters Bar North
Party	Candidate	Votes	%	±%
Conservative	M. Johnson	1,035	72.9	+5.0
Alliance	P. Shannon	294	20.7	–6.4
Labour	R. Page	91	6.4	+1.4
Majority		741	52.2	+11.4
Turnout		1,420	38.4	–9.4
Registered electors		3,698		
Conservative hold		Swing	▲5.7	

=== Potters Bar South ===
Potters Bar South
Party	Candidate	Votes	%	±%
Conservative	G. Ferguson	779	62.9	+3.6
Alliance	R. Vessey	245	19.8	–8.5
Labour	R. Angel	215	17.4	+5.0
Majority		534	43.1	+12.0
Turnout		1,239	41.6	–8.5
Registered electors		2,978		
Conservative hold		Swing	▲6.1	

=== Potters Bar West ===
Potters Bar West
Party	Candidate	Votes	%	±%
Conservative	M. Watts*	780	58.7	–0.3
Alliance	W. Ramage	319	24.0	–2.6
Labour	J. McCarthy	229	17.2	+2.8
Majority		461	34.7	+2.3
Turnout		1,328	36.6	–10.1
Registered electors		3,628		
Conservative hold		Swing	▲1.2	

=== St. James East ===
St. James East
Party	Candidate	Votes	%	±%
Alliance	L. Hodgson	769	44.9	–11.4
Conservative	A. Barton	642	37.5	–6.2
Labour	R. Clifton	302	17.6	N/A
Majority		127	7.4	–5.2
Turnout		1,713	55.1	+5.0
Registered electors		3,109		
Alliance hold		Swing	▼2.6	

=== St. James West ===
St. James West
Party	Candidate	Votes	%	±%
Conservative	A. Attwood	1,054	51.2	+1.1
Alliance	R. Briggs*	866	42.1	–7.8
Labour	P. Halsey	139	6.8	N/A
Majority		188	9.1	+8.9
Turnout		2,059	58.2	–3.3
Registered electors		3,538		
Conservative gain from Alliance		Swing	▲4.5	
