= 1984 Eastwood District Council election =

1984 Scottish local government election

Results by ward.

Elections for the Eastwood District Council took place on Thursday 3 May 1984, alongside elections to the councils of Scotland's various other districts.

The Conservatives continued their dominance of the council, winning 58% of the vote and all but two of the District's seats.

== Aggregate results ==
Eastwood District Council election, 1984 Turnout: 13,003
| Party | Seats | Gains | Losses | Net gain/loss | Seats % | Votes % | Votes | +/− |
|---|---|---|---|---|---|---|---|---|
| Conservative | 10 | 0 | 0 | 0 | 83.33 | 57.78 | 7,513 | |
| Ratepayers | 2 | 0 | 0 | 0 | 16.67 | 6.28 | 816 | |
| Labour | 0 | 0 | 0 | 0 | 0.00 | 15.70 | 2,041 | |
| Alliance | 0 | 0 | 0 | 0 | 0.00 | 13.70 | 1,782 | |
| SNP | 0 | 0 | 0 | 0 | 0.00 | 6.54 | 851 | |
