= 1984 City of Bradford Metropolitan District Council election =

City polls

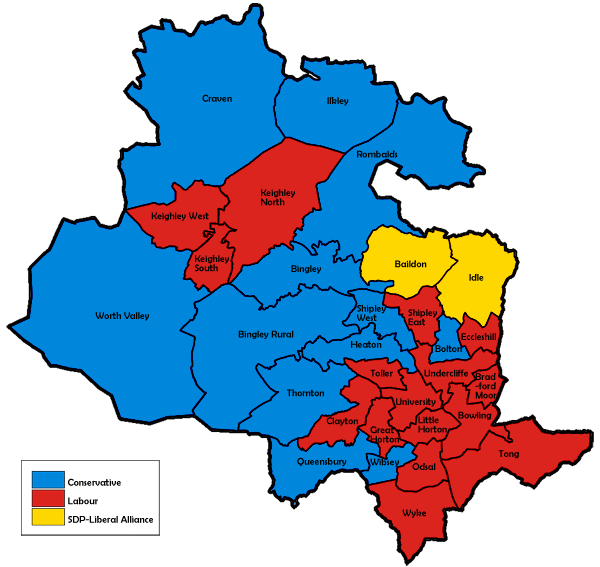
Map of the results for the 1984 Bradford council election.

The 1984 City of Bradford Metropolitan District Council elections were held on Thursday, 3 May 1984, with one third of the council and an extra vacancy in Bradford Moor to be elected. The council remained under no overall control.

== Election result ==
Bradford local election result 1984
Party	Seats	Gains	Losses	Net gain/loss	Seats %	Votes %	Votes	+/−
Labour	17	2	2	0	54.8	44.9	62,243	+5.2
Conservative	12	2	2	0	38.7	38.6	53,537	-1.6
Alliance	2	0	0	0	6.4	16.4	22,726	-3.6
Communist	0	0	0	0	0.0	0.1	149	+0.1
Workers Revolutionary	0	0	0	0	0.0	0.1	90	+0.1

This result had the following consequences for the total number of seats on the council after the elections:

Party	Previous council	New council
Conservatives	44	44
Labour	40	40
Alliance	6	6
Total	90	90
Working majority	-2	-2

== Ward results ==
Baildon
Party	Candidate	Votes	%	±%
Alliance (Liberal)	M. Atkinson	2,656	49.0	+9.2
Conservative	C. Charlesworth	2,033	37.5	−8.2
Labour	B. Hughes	731	13.5	−1.0
Majority		623	11.5	+5.5
Turnout		5,420		
Alliance hold		Swing	+8.7	

Bingley
Party	Candidate	Votes	%	±%
Conservative	J. Booth	2,237	48.9	+1.3
Labour	G. Carey	1,370	30.0	−4.7
Alliance (Liberal)	N. Tregoning	966	21.1	+3.4
Majority		867	19.0	+6.0
Turnout		4,573		
Conservative hold		Swing	+3.0	

Bingley Rural
Party	Candidate	Votes	%	±%
Conservative	P. Pettit	2,664	56.9	−5.3
Labour	Y. Tough	1,102	23.5	+2.2
Alliance (SDP)	F. Sunderland	915	19.5	+3.1
Majority		1,562	33.4	−7.5
Turnout		4,681		
Conservative hold		Swing	-3.7	

Bolton
Party	Candidate	Votes	%	±%
Conservative	S. Gaunt	1,767	43.1	−1.9
Labour	G. Mitchell	1,500	36.6	+1.4
Alliance (SDP)	J. Minshull	831	20.3	+0.4
Majority		267	6.5	−3.3
Turnout		4,098		
Conservative gain from Labour		Swing	-1.6	

Bowling
Party	Candidate	Votes	%	±%
Labour	L. Coughlin	3,008	73.0	+11.0
Conservative	B. Moore	1,111	27.0	+4.0
Majority		1,897	46.0	+7.0
Turnout		4,119		
Labour hold		Swing	+3.5	

Bradford Moor
Party	Candidate	Votes	%	±%
Labour	R. Cannell	2,930	63.3	+0.4
Labour	R. Bilheimer	2,835		
Conservative	P. Magson	1,204	26.0	+5.4
Conservative	S. Newton	1,133		
Alliance (SDP)	C. Lee	498	10.7	−5.8
Alliance (SDP)	W. Whitley	463		
Majority		1,726	37.3	−5.0
Turnout		4,632		
Labour hold		Swing		
Labour hold		Swing	-2.5	

Clayton
Party	Candidate	Votes	%	±%
Labour	G. Sutcliffe	2,513	48.0	+8.3
Conservative	E. Byrom	2,082	39.8	−7.2
Alliance (SDP)	J. Brennan	635	12.1	−1.2
Majority		431	8.2	+1.0
Turnout		5,230		
Labour gain from Conservative		Swing	+7.7	

Craven
Party	Candidate	Votes	%	±%
Conservative	E. Hoare	1,963	43.5	−3.6
Alliance (Liberal)	G. Funnell	1,657	36.7	+3.4
Labour	S. Best	893	19.8	+0.2
Majority		306	6.8	−7.0
Turnout		4,513		
Conservative hold		Swing	-3.5	

Eccleshill
Party	Candidate	Votes	%	±%
Labour	A. Dewhirst	2,013	46.1	+1.9
Conservative	D. Hill	1,595	36.5	−0.5
Alliance (Liberal)	J. Taylor	761	17.4	−1.5
Majority		418	9.6	+2.4
Turnout		4,369		
Labour hold		Swing	+1.2	

Great Horton
Party	Candidate	Votes	%	±%
Labour	P. Deeny	2,558	53.8	+4.6
Conservative	R. Warren	1,734	36.5	−3.8
Alliance (SDP)	R. Haines	458	9.6	−0.8
Majority		824	17.3	+8.5
Turnout		4,750		
Labour hold		Swing	+4.2	

Heaton
Party	Candidate	Votes	%	±%
Conservative	J. King	2,930	60.0	+9.8
Labour	S. Khokhar	1,398	28.6	+0.5
Alliance (SDP)	M. Khan	555	11.4	−10.3
Majority		1,532	31.4	+9.3
Turnout		4,883		
Conservative hold		Swing	+4.6	

Idle
Party	Candidate	Votes	%	±%
Alliance (Liberal)	D. Ward	1,664	36.3	+4.5
Conservative	H. Lycett	1,490	32.5	+0.3
Labour	G. Porter	1,429	31.2	−4.9
Majority		174	3.8	−0.0
Turnout		4,583		
Alliance hold		Swing	+2.1	

Ilkley
Party	Candidate	Votes	%	±%
Conservative	A. Blann	2,445	53.2	−10.7
Alliance (Liberal)	S. Moorhouse	1,706	37.1	+11.6
Labour	S. Tatham	447	9.7	−0.9
Majority		739	16.1	−22.3
Turnout		4,598		
Conservative hold		Swing	-11.1	

Keighley North
Party	Candidate	Votes	%	±%
Labour	T. Flanagan	2,319	47.0	+11.2
Conservative	P. Gilmour	1,981	40.2	+2.6
Alliance (SDP)	T. Figgess	633	12.8	−13.9
Majority		338	6.8	+5.1
Turnout		4,933		
Labour gain from Conservative		Swing	+4.3	

Keighley South
Party	Candidate	Votes	%	±%
Labour	J. Ryan	2,631	66.1	+4.6
Conservative	D. Lynas	834	20.9	−0.3
Alliance (Liberal)	B. Salmons	516	13.0	−4.3
Majority		1,797	45.1	+4.9
Turnout		3,981		
Labour hold		Swing	+2.4	

Keighley West
Party	Candidate	Votes	%	±%
Labour	S. Bowen	2,584	52.3	+1.4
Conservative	T. Whitley	1,635	33.1	−2.4
Alliance (Liberal)	R. Quayle	722	14.6	+1.1
Majority		949	19.2	+3.8
Turnout		4,941		
Labour hold		Swing	+1.9	

Little Horton
Party	Candidate	Votes	%	±%
Labour	J. Cairns	2,733	71.3	+16.8
Conservative	G. Johnson	743	19.4	+0.1
Alliance (SDP)	M. Afzal	357	9.3	−16.9
Majority		1,990	51.9	+23.7
Turnout		3,833		
Labour hold		Swing	+8.3	

Odsal
Party	Candidate	Votes	%	±%
Labour	D. Bentley	2,398	50.4	+4.3
Conservative	J. Sizer	1,525	32.0	−6.7
Alliance (Liberal)	K. Reynolds	838	17.6	+2.3
Majority		873	18.3	+11.0
Turnout		4,761		
Labour hold		Swing	+5.5	

Queensbury
Party	Candidate	Votes	%	±%
Conservative	I. Cookland	2,361	44.5	−1.1
Labour	G. Foster	2,242	42.3	+3.3
Alliance (Liberal)	C. Best	701	13.2	−2.2
Majority		119	2.2	−4.4
Turnout		5,304		
Conservative hold		Swing	-2.2	

Rombalds
Party	Candidate	Votes	%	±%
Conservative	W. Clavering	2,834	56.3	−1.8
Alliance (Liberal)	C. Svensgaard	1,236	24.5	−4.7
Labour	J. Grogan	964	19.1	+6.5
Majority		1,598	31.7	+2.9
Turnout		5,034		
Conservative hold		Swing	+1.4	

Shipley East
Party	Candidate	Votes	%	±%
Labour	N. Free	2,219	57.2	+2.9
Conservative	B. Larkin	1,071	27.6	−1.6
Alliance (Liberal)	I. Horner	590	15.2	−1.3
Majority		1,148	29.6	+4.5
Turnout		3,880		
Labour hold		Swing	+2.2	

Shipley West
Party	Candidate	Votes	%	±%
Conservative	O. Messer	2,747	50.1	−5.2
Labour	C. Butler	1,950	35.6	+10.7
Alliance (SDP)	M. Pollard	781	14.3	−2.5
Majority		797	14.5	−15.9
Turnout		5,478		
Conservative hold		Swing	-7.9	

Thornton
Party	Candidate	Votes	%	±%
Conservative	A. Townsend	1,960	45.2	−5.4
Labour	R. Swindells	1,909	44.0	+11.2
Alliance (Liberal)	S. Whitehead	469	10.8	−5.8
Majority		51	1.2	−16.6
Turnout		4,338		
Conservative gain from Labour		Swing	-8.3	

Toller
Party	Candidate	Votes	%	±%
Labour	R. Goldberg	2,651	49.1	+8.7
Conservative	V. Holdsworth	2,129	39.4	−2.0
Alliance (SDP)	H. Rashid	623	11.5	−6.7
Majority		522	9.7	+8.6
Turnout		5,403		
Labour hold		Swing	+5.3	

Tong
Party	Candidate	Votes	%	±%
Labour	J. Senior	2,936	80.1	+13.0
Conservative	H. Thorne	730	19.9	−0.9
Majority		2,206	60.2	+13.8
Turnout		3,666		
Labour hold		Swing	+6.9	

Undercliffe
Party	Candidate	Votes	%	±%
Labour	G. Goodyear	2,559	57.8	+6.4
Conservative	H. Ibbotson	1,380	31.1	−3.2
Alliance (SDP)	M. Attenborough	491	11.1	−3.1
Majority		1,179	26.6	+9.6
Turnout		4,430		
Labour hold		Swing	+4.8	

University
Party	Candidate	Votes	%	±%
Labour	M. Ajeeb	4,321	78.0	+14.5
Conservative	J. Orpwood	720	13.0	+1.1
Alliance (SDP)	G. Telfer	346	6.2	−16.9
Communist	J. Baruch	149	2.7	+1.3
Majority		3,601	65.0	+24.6
Turnout		5,536		
Labour hold		Swing	+6.7	

Wibsey
Party	Candidate	Votes	%	±%
Conservative	F. Hillam	2,205	51.3	+8.1
Labour	R. Kubicsek	2,001	46.6	+5.8
Workers Revolutionary	E. McEvoy	90	2.1	+2.1
Majority		204	4.7	+2.3
Turnout		4,296		
Conservative hold		Swing	+1.1	

Worth Valley
Party	Candidate	Votes	%	±%
Conservative	G. Hodgson	2,224	53.7	−2.7
Labour	B. Brown	1,527	36.9	+7.8
Alliance (Liberal)	R. Taylor	390	9.4	−5.2
Majority		697	16.8	−10.5
Turnout		4,141		
Conservative hold		Swing	-5.2	

Wyke
Party	Candidate	Votes	%	±%
Labour	L. Kearns	2,407	55.4	+8.3
Conservative	D. Owen	1,203	27.7	−6.0
Alliance (SDP)	J. Ryan	731	16.8	−2.4
Majority		1,204	27.7	+14.3
Turnout		4,341		
Labour hold		Swing	+7.1	
