= 1984 Bearsden and Milngavie District Council election =

1984 Scottish local government election

The 1984 Bearsden and Milngavie District Council election took place on 3 May 1984, alongside elections to the councils of Scotland's 53 other districts.

== Results ==
1984 Bearsden and Milngavie District Council election result
Party	Seats	Gains	Losses	Net gain/loss	Seats %	Votes %	Votes	+/−
Conservative	6	1	1	Steady	60.0	44.2	7,123	▼13.4
Alliance	2	2	0	▲2	20.0	27.2	4,379	▲17.5
Labour	1	0	1	▼1	10.0	14.8	2,385	▼3.3
Independent	1	0	1	▼1	10.0	10.6	1,713	▲1.7
SNP	0	0	0	Steady	0.0	2.7	437	▼3.1
Ecology	0	0	0	Steady	0.0	0.5	81	New
