= 1984 Cheltenham Borough Council election =

Cheltenham Borough Council election

The 1984 Cheltenham Council election took place on 3 May 1984 to elect members of Cheltenham Borough Council in Gloucestershire, England. One third of the council was up for election. The SDP–Liberal Alliance became the largest party, but the council stayed in no overall control.

After the election, the composition of the council was

- SDP–Liberal Alliance 14
- Conservative 12
- Residents Associations 4
- Labour 2
- Independent Conservative 1

== Election result ==
Cheltenham local election result 1984
Party	Seats	Gains	Losses	Net gain/loss	Seats %	Votes %	Votes	+/−
Alliance	6	2	0	▲2	54.5	42.7	12,646	▲7.4
Conservative	3	0	4	▼4	27.3	39.3	11,619	▼1.8
Labour	1	1	0	▲1	9.1	13.3	3,940	▲4.1
Residents	1	1	0	▲1	9.1	4.7	1,392	▼2.3

== Ward results ==
All Saints
Party	Candidate	Votes	%	±%
Alliance	Alastair Jollans	1,445	47.6	−1.5
Conservative	Roy Miles*	1,278	42.1	−8.3
Labour	Diana Hale	310	10.2	N/A
Majority		167	5.5	
Turnout		3,033	45.1	
Alliance gain from Conservative		Swing		

Charlton Kings
Party	Candidate	Votes	%	±%
Residents	Anthony Jeans	1,392	51.6	−1.5
Conservative	Margaret Heapey	1,085	40.2	+0.8
Labour	Abraham Yates	219	8.1	N/A
Majority		307	11.4	
Turnout		2,696	41.6	
Residents gain from Conservative		Swing		

College
Party	Candidate	Votes	%	±%
Alliance	Philip Gray	1,732	48.7	+2.8
Conservative	Michael Sheppard*	1,649	46.4	−5.0
Labour	Derek Owen	178	4.9	N/A
Majority		83	2.3	
Turnout		3,559	52.3	
Alliance gain from Conservative		Swing		

Hatherley
Party	Candidate	Votes	%	±%
Alliance	Jeremy Whales*	1,805	57.8	−1.8
Conservative	Daphne Pennell	1,045	33.4	−9.8
Labour	Dudley Newell	275	8.8	N/A
Majority		760	24.4	
Turnout		3,125	47.8	
Alliance hold		Swing		

Hesters Way
Party	Candidate	Votes	%	±%
Conservative	Harry Turbyfield*	923	39.6	+6.2
Labour	Martin Hale	774	33.2	+5.0
Alliance	Jean Holder	635	27.2	±0.0
Majority		149	6.4	
Turnout		2,332	35.1	
Conservative hold		Swing		

Lansdown
Party	Candidate	Votes	%	±%
Conservative	Aimbury Dodwell*	1,227	57.0	−8.1
Alliance	Ronald Hunt	738	34.3	+2.7
Labour	Jonquil Naish	189	8.8	N/A
Majority		489	22.7	
Turnout		2,154	38.5	
Conservative hold		Swing		

Park
Party	Candidate	Votes	%	±%
Conservative	William Bullingham*	1,556	54.9	+0.8
Alliance	Dorothy Staight	1,227	45.1	+10.1
Majority		329	9.8	
Turnout		2,783	51.3	
Conservative hold		Swing		

Pittville
Party	Candidate	Votes	%	±%
Labour	James Pennington	969	36.0	+0.4
Conservative	Christopher Britton*	874	32.4	−5.9
Alliance	Bernard Fisher	852	31.6	+3.0
Majority		95	3.6	
Turnout		2,695	43.6	
Labour gain from Conservative		Swing		

St Mark's
Party	Candidate	Votes	%	±%
Alliance	Alexis Cassin*	1,440	64.8	+11.7
Conservative	William Fisher	453	20.4	−5.5
Labour	William Evans	329	14.8	−4.9
Majority		947	44.4	
Turnout		2,222	37.5	
Alliance hold		Swing		

St Paul's
Party	Candidate	Votes	%	±%
Alliance	Paul Baker*	1,430	55.9	+17.7
Conservative	Robert Wilson	811	31.7	−3.9
Labour	Brenda Moody	317	12.4	−6.0
Majority		619	24.2	
Turnout		2,558	45.0	
Alliance hold		Swing		

St Peter's
Party	Candidate	Votes	%	±%
Alliance	Gilbert Wakeley*	1,292	54.0	+9.1
Conservative	Allan Axton	718	30.0	−5.1
Labour	Phillip Chappell	384	16.0	+0.1
Majority		574	24.0	
Turnout		2,394	41.4	
Alliance hold		Swing		
