= 1984 Bolton Metropolitan Borough Council election =

1984 UK local government election

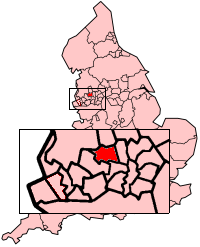
The Metropolitan Borough of Bolton shown within England

The 1984 Bolton Metropolitan Borough Council election took place on 3 May 1984 to elect members of Bolton Metropolitan Borough Council in Greater Manchester, England. One third of the council was up for election and the Labour Party kept overall control of the council

21 seats were contested in the election: 13 were won by the Labour Party, 6 by the Conservative Party and 2 by the Liberal Party. In the Hulton ward, 2 Councillors were elected. After the election, the composition of the council was:

- Labour 36
- Conservative 20
- Liberal Party 4

== Election result ==
Bolton local election result 1984
Party	Seats	Gains	Losses	Net gain/loss	Seats %	Votes %	Votes	+/−
Labour	13	1	1	0		47.5	36,727	+4.0
Conservative	6	0	2	-2		34.7	26,854	-3.3
Alliance	2	2	0	+2		17.7	13,707	-0.8

== Council Composition ==
Prior to the election the composition of the council was:

↓
36	22	2
Labour	Conservative	L

After the election the composition of the council was:

↓
36	20	4
Labour	Conservative	L

L – Liberal/SDP Alliance

== Ward results ==
=== Astley Bridge ward ===
Astley Bridge ward
Party	Candidate	Votes	%	±%
Conservative	W Higham	2,177	54.1	−5.0
Labour	J Kilcoyne	1,314	32.7	+4.7
SDP	D Newman	532	13.2	+0.3
Majority		1,014	25.2	−5.8
Turnout		4,023	40.4	−4.1
Conservative hold		Swing	Con to Labour 4.8	

=== Blackrod ward ===
Blackrod ward
Party	Candidate	Votes	%	±%
Labour	E Johnson	1,968	54.8	+2.3
Conservative	N Troup	1,267	35.3	−1.3
SDP	G Langdon	359	10.0	−0.9
Majority		701	19.5	+5.2
Turnout		3,594	38.2	−8.0
Labour hold		Swing	Con to Labour 1.8	

=== Bradshaw ward ===
Bradshaw ward
Party	Candidate	Votes	%	±%
Conservative	W Hall	2,087	53.3	−4.6
Labour	D McEneaney	1,091	27.9	+4.0
Liberal	R Steele	734	18.8	+0.5
Majority		996	25.5	−8.5
Turnout		3,912	36.0	−4.7
Conservative hold		Swing	Con to Labour 4.3	

=== Breightmet ward ===
Breightmet ward
Party	Candidate	Votes	%	±%
Labour	K McIvor	2,243	52.1	+2.9
Conservative	I Chesney	1,581	36.7	+0.5
SDP	D Lee	479	11.1	−3.4
Majority		662	15.4	+2.4
Turnout		4,303	38.0	−1.1
Labour hold		Swing	SDP to Labour 3.1	

=== Bromley Cross ward ===
Bromley Cross ward
Party	Candidate	Votes	%	±%
Conservative	A Poulson	2,231	51.5	−3.4
Labour	D Doxsey	1,107	25.6	+6.2
SDP	C Moore	993	22.9	−2.8
Majority		1,124	25.9	−3.3
Turnout		4,331	42.0	−4.6
Conservative hold		Swing	Con to Labour 4.8	

=== Burnden ward ===
Burnden ward
Party	Candidate	Votes	%	±%
Labour	D Eastwood	1,993	52.7	+5.5
Conservative	E Holland	1,501	39.7	−1.3
Liberal	S Vickers	268	7.6	−4.2
Majority		492	13.1	+6.9
Turnout		3,780	41.0	−7.0
Labour hold		Swing	Liberal to Labour 4.8	

=== Central ward ===
Central ward
Party	Candidate	Votes	%	±%
Labour	B Howarth	2,403	71.5	+2.2
Conservative	T Haslam	607	18.0	+0.8
Liberal	G Meadows	353	10.5	−3.0
Majority		1,796	53.4	−9.8
Turnout		3,363	39.3	−4.3
Labour hold		Swing	Liberal to Labour 2.6	

=== Daubhill ward ===
Daubhill ward
Party	Candidate	Votes	%	±%
Labour	T Anderton	2,615	63.3	+2.8
Conservative	P Gore	1,228	29.7	−3.4
SDP	K Banks	198	4.8	−1.5
Independent	J Hamilton	92	2.2	+2.2
Majority		1,387	33.6	+6.2
Turnout		4,133	44.5	−5.0
Labour hold		Swing	Con to Labour 3.1	

=== Deane-cum-Heaton ward ===
Deane-cum-Heaton ward
Party	Candidate	Votes	%	±%
Conservative	D Berry	2,959	58.0	+0.9
Labour	T Hyams	1,087	22.3	+2.4
SDP	I Hamilton	1,057	20.7	−3.3
Majority		1,872	36.7	+3.7
Turnout		5,103	39.5	−6.2
Conservative hold		Swing	SDP to Labour 2.8	

=== Derby ward ===
Derby ward
Party	Candidate	Votes	%	±%
Labour	J Foster	3,171	81.1	+3.2
Conservative	P Small	519	13.3	−0.4
SDP	D Holland	222	5.7	−0.8
Majority		2,652	67.8	+3.6
Turnout		3,912	38.7	−1.6
Labour hold		Swing	SDP to Labour 2.0	

=== Farnworth ward ===
Farnworth ward
Party	Candidate	Votes	%	±%
Labour	J Wild	2,222	78.7	+14.6
Liberal	L Sanderson	603	21.3	+8.5
Majority		1,619	57.3	+16.4
Turnout		2,825	28.9	−3.7
Labour hold		Swing		

=== Halliwell ward ===
Halliwell ward
Party	Candidate	Votes	%	±%
Labour	E Hamer	1,853	44.4	+0.6
Liberal	A Halliwell	1,571	37.6	+4.1
Conservative	S Dawson	752	18.0	−4.7
Majority		282	6.7	−3.8
Turnout		4,176	42.0	−3.5
Labour hold		Swing	Con to Liberal -4.4	

=== Harper Green ward ===
Harper Green ward
Party	Candidate	Votes	%	±%
Labour	J Boardman	2,401	65.1	+4.4
Conservative	A Royse	969	25.4	+11.8
Liberal	P Regan	351	9.5	−15.1
Majority		1,465	39.7	+3.6
Turnout		3,688	35.2	−1.8
Labour hold		Swing	Con to Liberal 13.4	

=== Horwich ward ===
Horwich ward
Party	Candidate	Votes	%	±%
Labour	E Seddon	2,137	45.0	+2.1
Conservative	J Blakemore	1,850	38.9	+1.6
SDP	M Alcroft	686	14.4	−5.4
Independent	D Harrison	77	1.6	+1.6
Majority		287	6.0	+0.4
Turnout		4,750	43.6	−4.9
Labour hold		Swing	SDP to Labour 3.7	

=== Hulton Park ward ===
Hulton Park ward
Party	Candidate	Votes	%	±%
Conservative	K Hornby	1,897	27.2	
Conservative	F Rushton	1,801	25.8	
Labour	E Walker	1,198	17.2	
Labour	N Wild	1,079	15.5	
Liberal	D Cooper	540	7.7	
Liberal	C Monk	456	6.5	
Turnout		6,971		
Conservative hold				
Conservative hold				

=== Kearsley ward ===
Kearsley ward
Party	Candidate	Votes	%	±%
Labour	J Alker	2,154	56.3	+7.1
Liberal	E Bell	1,070	28.0	+11.7
Conservative	A Waterson	601	15.7	−18.8
Majority		1,084	28.3	+13.6
Turnout		3,825	39.8	−4.2
Labour hold		Swing	Liberal to Con -15.2	

=== Little Lever ward ===
Little Lever ward
Party	Candidate	Votes	%	±%
Labour	M Connell	1,818	49.6	+9.7
Conservative	A Longmire	1,557	42.5	−4.9
SDP	P Keveaney	293	8.0	−4.7
Majority		260	7.1	
Turnout		3,667	40.0	−5.6
Labour gain from Conservative		Swing	Con to Labour -7.3	

=== Smithills ward ===
Smithills ward
Party	Candidate	Votes	%	±%
Liberal	R Hayes	1,879	45.0	+5.9
Conservative	S Collier	1,728	41.4	−3.7
Labour	F Hampson	566	13.6	−2.2
Majority		151	3.6	
Turnout		4,173	47.0	−1.3
Liberal gain from Conservative		Swing	Con to Liberal -4.8	

=== Tonge ward ===
Tonge ward
Party	Candidate	Votes	%	±%
Labour	A Brigg	2,202	54.4	+7.1
Conservative	G Kearton	1,567	38.7	−5.0
SDP	E West	280	6.9	−2.1
Majority		635	15.7	+12.1
Turnout		4,049	43.7	−0.8
Labour hold		Swing	Con to Labour -6.0	

=== Westhoughton ward ===
Westhoughton ward
Party	Candidate	Votes	%	±%
Liberal	D Wilkinson	1,247	50.0	+16.4
Labour	P Woodcock	1,245	50.0	+1.2
Majority		2	0.0	
Turnout		2,492	37.6	−10.7
Liberal gain from Labour				
