= 1984 Gloucester City Council election =

UK local election

The 1984 Gloucester City Council election took place on 1 May 1984 to elect members of Gloucester City Council in England.

== Results ==
Gloucester City Council election, 1984
Party	Seats	Gains	Losses	Net gain/loss	Seats %	Votes %	Votes	+/−
Conservative	16				48.5			
Labour	11				33.3			
Alliance	6				18.2			

== Ward results ==
=== Barnwood ===
Barnwood 1984
Party	Candidate	Votes	%	±%
Labour	Ms.* E. Hedge	1,529	43.1	
Conservative	P. Robins	1,526	43.0	
Alliance	N. Abell	536	13.6	
Turnout		3,591	42.8	
Labour hold		Swing		

=== Barton ===
Barton 1984
Party	Candidate	Votes	%	±%
Labour	M. Kilby	1,149	51.3	
Conservative	A. Williams	768	34.3	
Alliance	G. Powick	322	14.4	
Turnout		2,239	39.2	
Labour gain from Conservative		Swing		

=== Eastgate ===
Eastgate 1984
Party	Candidate	Votes	%	±%
Labour	K. Annis	1,363	53.3	
Conservative	Ms. I. Fowler	977	38.2	
Alliance	C. Stephenson	216	8.5	
Turnout		2,556	42.1	
Labour hold		Swing		

=== Hucclecote ===
Hucclecote 1984
Party	Candidate	Votes	%	±%
Conservative	C.* Pullon	1,441	44.1	
Alliance	R. Cox	1,303	39.9	
Labour	Ms. K. Mills	523	16.0	
Turnout		3,267	52.1	
Conservative hold		Swing		

=== Kingsholm ===
Kingsholm 1984
Party	Candidate	Votes	%	±%
Alliance	M. Warlow	1,658	48.7	
Conservative	L.* Journeaux	1,279	37.5	
Labour	Ms. J. Kirby	470	13.8	
Turnout		3,407	56.7	
Alliance gain from Conservative		Swing		

=== Linden ===
Linden 1984
Party	Candidate	Votes	%	±%
Conservative	A. Gilberthorpe	1,302	41.0	
Labour	R.* Grimes	1,138	35.8	
Alliance	M. Jordan	738	23.2	
Turnout		3,178	54.5	
Conservative gain from Labour		Swing		

=== Longlevens ===
Longlevens 1984
Party	Candidate	Votes	%	±%
Conservative	J.* Robins	1,617	50.6	
Labour	T. Sherwood	877	27.4	
Alliance	M. Butler	703	22.0	
Turnout		3,197	51.7	
Conservative hold		Swing		

=== Matson ===
Matson 1984
Party	Candidate	Votes	%	±%
Conservative	C. Peak	1,192	60.9	
Labour	E. Mayall	500	25.5	
Alliance	C. Cole	265	13.5	
Turnout		1,957	30.4	
Conservative gain from Labour		Swing		

=== Podsmead ===
Podsmead 1984
Party	Candidate	Votes	%	±%
Alliance	J. Day	1,745	60.3	
Labour	R. Thomas	669	23.1	
Conservative	J. Owen	482	16.6	
Turnout		2,896	48.9	
Alliance hold		Swing		

=== Tuffley ===
Tuffley 1984
Party	Candidate	Votes	%	±%
Labour	R. Smith	1,523	47.1	
Conservative	Ms. J. Bracey	1,305	40.4	
Alliance	S. O'Connor	406	12.6	
Turnout		3,234	51.6	
Labour gain from Conservative		Swing		

=== Westgate ===
Westgate 1984
Party	Candidate	Votes	%	±%
Conservative	C.* Fudge	880	37.7	
Alliance	R. Welshman	878	37.6	
Labour	D. Evans	576	24.7	
Turnout		2,334	43.3	
Conservative hold		Swing		
