= 1984 Strathkelvin District Council election =

1984 Scottish local government election

The 1984 Strathkelvin District Council election took place on 3 May 1984, alongside elections to the councils of Scotland's 53 other districts.

== Results ==
1984 Strathkelvin District Council election result
Party	Seats	Gains	Losses	Net gain/loss	Seats %	Votes %	Votes	+/−
Labour	11	-	-	▲1	73.3	51.8	16,331	▲3.5
Conservative	4	-	-	Steady	26.7	22.7	7,146	▼5.1
SNP	0	-	-	Steady	0.0	14.0	4,438	▼9.9
Alliance	0	-	-	Steady	0.0	9.0	2,849	New
Independent Labour	0	-	-	Steady	0.0	1.9	605	New
Tenants Association	0	-	-	Steady	0.0	0.5	150	New

Note: There were 14 seats at the previous election in 1980.
