= 1984 West Dorset District Council election =

1984 UK local government election

← 1983	3 May 1984	1986 →

18 of 55 seats (one third) to West Dorset District Council 28 seats needed for a majority
	First party	Second party	Third party
	Ind	Con	All
Party	Independent	Conservative	Alliance
Seats before	30	15	6
Seats won	9	7	0
Seats after	28	17	6
Seat change	▼2	▲2	Steady
Popular vote	2,484	4,812	2,311
Percentage	21.8%	42.2%	20.3%
	Fourth party	Fifth party
	IndC	Lab
Party	Ind. Conservative	Labour
Seats before	3	1
Seats won	1	1
Seats after	3	1
Seat change	Steady	Steady
Popular vote	N/A	1,793
Percentage	N/A	15.7%
Council control before election
Independent
Council control after election
Independent

The 1984 West Dorset District Council election was held on Thursday 3 May 1984 to elect councillors to West Dorset District Council in England. It took place on the same day as other district council elections in the United Kingdom. One third of seats were up for election.

The 1984 election saw the Independent councillors lose seats but maintain their majority control on the Council.

== Ward results ==
=== Beaminster ===
Beaminster
Party	Candidate	Votes	%	±%
Independent	A. Hudson *	unopposed	N/A	N/A
Registered electors		2,794		
Independent hold				

=== Bridport North ===
Bridport North
Party	Candidate	Votes	%	±%
Conservative	S. Baker	703	46.3	+13.7
Labour	D. Cash *	502	33.0	+2.9
Alliance	R. Draper	315	20.7	–16.6
Majority		201	13.3	N/A
Turnout			49.1	–18.4
Registered electors		3,096		
Conservative gain from Labour				

=== Bridport South ===
Bridport South
Party	Candidate	Votes	%	±%
Independent	C. Samways *	551	60.4	N/A
Conservative	D. England	361	39.6	N/A
Majority		190	20.8	N/A
Turnout			37.0	N/A
Registered electors		2,465		
Independent hold				

=== Burton Bradstock ===
Burton Bradstock
Party	Candidate	Votes	%	±%
Independent	R. Bailey *	unopposed	N/A	N/A
Registered electors		1,137		
Independent hold				

=== Caundle Vale ===
Caundle Vale
Party	Candidate	Votes	%	±%
Independent	N. White *	unopposed	N/A	N/A
Registered electors		1,048		
Independent hold				

=== Charminster ===
Charminster
Party	Candidate	Votes	%	±%
Conservative	B. Woodhouse	385	63.0	+23.6
Alliance	G. Halliwell	188	30.8	+12.5
Independent	L. Cobold	38	6.2	N/A
Majority		192	32.2	N/A
Turnout			45.2	–3.8
Registered electors		1,352		
Conservative gain from Independent		Swing		

=== Charmouth ===
Charmouth
Party	Candidate	Votes	%	±%
Independent	J. Cockerill *	unopposed	N/A	N/A
Registered electors		1,284		
Independent hold				

=== Chesil Bank ===
Chesil Bank
Party	Candidate	Votes	%	±%
Independent	M. Pengelly *	unopposed	N/A	N/A
Registered electors		1,269		
Independent hold				

=== Chickerell ===
Chickerell
Party	Candidate	Votes	%	±%
Conservative	E. Davies	427	49.5	–14.4
Independent	F. Shereston	276	32.0	N/A
Independent	P. Brown	159	18.4	N/A
Majority		151	17.5	N/A
Turnout			29.6	–5.0
Registered electors		2,912		
Conservative gain from Independent				

=== Dorchester South ===
Dorchester South
Party	Candidate	Votes	%	±%
Conservative	J. Hebb *	863	53.3	–2.7
Alliance	D. Kingston	572	35.3	–8.7
Labour	T. Warren	185	11.4	N/A
Majority		291	18.0	N/A
Turnout			52.6	–8.3
Registered electors		3,657		
Conservative hold		Swing		

=== Dorchester West ===
Dorchester West
Party	Candidate	Votes	%	±%
Labour	J. Antell	593	37.9	+18.9
Conservative	F. Alderman *	557	35.6	–11.2
Alliance	T. Harries	416	26.6	–7.6
Majority		36	2.3	N/A
Turnout			47.9	–27.6
Registered electors		3,269		
Labour gain from Conservative				

=== Frome Valley ===
Frome Valley
Party	Candidate	Votes	%	±%
Independent	B. Bryant *	370	65.1	N/A
Alliance	G. Simpson	198	34.9	N/A
Majority		172	30.2	N/A
Turnout			53.2	N/A
Registered electors		1,068		
Independent hold				

=== Lyme Regis ===
Lyme Regis
Party	Candidate	Votes	%	±%
Conservative	J. Nuttall *	801	73.6	+34.4
Independent	V. Homyer	288	26.4	N/A
Majority		513	47.2	N/A
Turnout			37.1	–9.6
Registered electors		2,935		
Conservative hold		Swing		

=== Maiden Newton ===
Maiden Newton
Party	Candidate	Votes	%	±%
Independent	H. Haward *	575	71.7	+4.7
Independent	N. Patmore	227	28.3	N/A
Majority		348	43.4	+9.4
Turnout			78.2	+4.8
Registered electors		1,026		
Independent hold				

=== Piddle Valley ===
Piddle Valley
Party	Candidate	Votes	%	±%
Ind. Conservative	A. Read *	unopposed	N/A	N/A
Registered electors		1,218		
Ind. Conservative hold				

=== Sherborne West ===
Sherborne West
Party	Candidate	Votes	%	±%
Conservative	P. Jenkins *	715	38.6	+6.2
Alliance	L. Siegle	622	33.6	+3.8
Labour	A. Mitchell	513	27.7	N/A
Majority		93	5.0	N/A
Turnout			45.9	–14.8
Registered electors		4,031		
Conservative hold		Swing		

=== Thorncombe ===
Thorncombe
Party	Candidate	Votes	%	±%
Independent	P. Atyeo *	unopposed	N/A	N/A
Registered electors		1,038		
Independent hold				

=== Whitchurch Canonicorum ===
Whitchurch Canonicorum
Party	Candidate	Votes	%	±%
Conservative	C. Gibson*	unopposed	N/A	N/A
Registered electors		1,157		
Conservative hold				
