= 1984 Broxbourne Borough Council election =

1984 UK local government election

The Broxbourne Council election, 1984 was held to elect council members of the Broxbourne Borough Council, the local government authority of the borough of Broxbourne, Hertfordshire, England.

== Composition of expiring seats before election ==
Ward	Party	Incumbent Elected	Incumbent	Standing again?
Broxbourne	Conservative	1980	Joan Fiddy	Yes
Bury Green	Labour	1980	Christopher Robbins	Yes
Cheshunt Central	Conservative	1980	Douglas Breeze	Yes
Cheshunt North	Conservative	1980	Gerald Game	Yes
Flamstead End	Conservative	1980	Edna Lazzari	Yes
Goffs Oak	Conservative	1980	Michael Janes	Yes
Hoddesdon North	Conservative	1980	John Hastings	No
Hoddesdon Town	SDP - Liberal Alliance	1983	Julian Gould	Yes
Rosedale	Labour	1980	Hazel Ross	Yes
Rye Park	Conservative	1980	Mark Farrington (Note: Mark Farrington stood in Cheshunt North Ward in 1984.)	Yes
Theobalds	Conservative	1980	Terence Askew	Yes
Waltham Cross North	Conservative	1980	Francis Dolan	Yes
Waltham Cross South	Labour	1980	Patricia Young	No
Wormley & Turnford	Conservative	1980	Gerald Cookson	No

== Election results ==
Broxbourne local election result 1984
Party	Seats	Gains	Losses	Net gain/loss	Seats %	Votes %	Votes	+/−
Conservative	11	1	0	+1	78.57	51.28	10,807	
Labour	2	0	1	-1	14.29	28.17	5,937	
Alliance	1	0	0	0	7.14	20.55	4,331	

== Results summary ==
An election was held in 14 wards on 3 May 1984.

14 seats were contested.

The Conservative Party gained one seat from the Labour Party in Rosedale Ward

The political balance of the council following this election was:

- Conservative 33 seats
- Labour 5 seats
- SDP-Liberal Alliance 4 Seats

== Ward results ==
Broxbourne Ward Result 3 May 1984
Party	Candidate	Votes	%	±%
Conservative	Joan Fiddy	1,021	58.64	
Alliance	Ronald Jones	573	32.91	
Labour	Robert King	147	8.45	
Majority		448		
Turnout		1,741	33.00	
Conservative hold		Swing		

Bury Green Ward Result 3 May 1984
Party	Candidate	Votes	%	±%
Labour	Chris Robbins	1,199	51.93	
Conservative	Charles Tyler	946	40.97	
Alliance	Lesley Dines	164	7.10	
Majority		253		
Turnout		2,309	40.20	
Labour hold		Swing		

Cheshunt Central Ward Result 3 May 1984
Party	Candidate	Votes	%	±%
Conservative	Douglas Breeze	808	68.94	
Labour	David May	193	16.47	
Alliance	Thomas Wade	171	14.59	
Majority		615		
Turnout		1,172	32.70	
Conservative hold		Swing		

Cheshunt North Ward Result 3 May 1984
Party	Candidate	Votes	%	±%
Conservative	Gerald Game	807	51.90	
Labour	Mark Farrington	500	32.15	
Alliance	Laurence Talbot	248	15.95	
Majority		307		
Turnout		1,555	34.20	
Conservative hold		Swing		

Flamstead End Ward Result 3 May 1984
Party	Candidate	Votes	%	±%
Conservative	Edna Lazzari	909	60.88	
Labour	Arthur Warner	370	24.78	
Alliance	Janet Parishi	214	14.34	
Majority		539		
Turnout		1,493	33.70	
Conservative hold		Swing		

Goffs Oak Ward Result 3 May 1984
Party	Candidate	Votes	%	±%
Conservative	Michael Janes	801	68.75	
Alliance	Paul Collins	265	22.75	
Labour	Kenneth Gregory	99	8.50	
Majority		536		
Turnout		1,165	36.90	
Conservative hold		Swing		

Hoddesdon North Ward Result 3 May 1984
Party	Candidate	Votes	%	±%
Conservative	Brian Cunningham	1,156	65.24	
Alliance	Patricia Waughray	361	20.37	
Labour	Gill Garrett	255	14.39	
Majority		795		
Turnout		1,772	36.70	
Conservative hold		Swing		

Hoddesdon Town Ward Result 3 May 1984
Party	Candidate	Votes	%	±%
Alliance	Julian Gould	1,016	49.18	
Conservative	Percy Madsen	808	39.11	
Labour	Julian Batsleer	242	11.71	
Majority		208		
Turnout		2,066	45.40	
Alliance hold		Swing		

Rosedale Ward Result 3 May 1984
Party	Candidate	Votes	%	±%
Conservative	Tom Wight	312	36.58	
Alliance	David Lefley	303	35.52	
Labour	Hazel Ross	238	27.90	
Majority		9		
Turnout		853	41.80	
Conservative gain from Labour		Swing		

Rye Park Ward Result 3 May 1984
Party	Candidate	Votes	%	±%
Labour	Paul Garratt	898	48.65	
Conservative	John Davison	736	39.87	
Alliance	John Woods	212	11.48	
Majority		162		
Turnout		1,846	41.70	
Labour hold		Swing		

Theobalds Ward Result 3 May 1984
Party	Candidate	Votes	%	±%
Conservative	Terence Askew	693	57.51	
Labour	John Brown	341	28.30	
Alliance	John Doolan	171	14.19	
Majority		352		
Turnout		1,205	30.50	
Conservative hold		Swing		

Waltham Cross North Ward Result 3 May 1984
Party	Candidate	Votes	%	±%
Conservative	Frank Dolan	687	59.38	
Labour	Graham Knight	313	27.05	
Alliance	Walter Riley	157	13.57	
Majority		374		
Turnout		1,157	37.00	
Conservative hold		Swing		

Waltham Cross South Ward Result 3 May 1984
Party	Candidate	Votes	%	±%
Labour	Martin Hudson	919	57.47	
Conservative	Terence Rocke	444	27.77	
Alliance	Peter Huse	236	14.76	
Majority				
Turnout		1,599	43.00	
Labour hold		Swing		

Wormley / Turnford Ward Result 3 May 1984
Party	Candidate	Votes	%	±%
Conservative	Eric Martin	685	54.89	
Labour	Edwin Chick	323	25.88	
Alliance	Barbara Wade	240	19.23	
Majority		352		
Turnout		1,248	29.80	
Conservative hold		Swing		
