= 1984 Wolverhampton Metropolitan Borough Council election =

1984 UK local government election

The 1984 Council elections held in Wolverhampton on Thursday 3 May 1984 were one third, and 20 of the 60 seats were up for election.

During the 1984 election the Conservatives gained the Bushbury seat from Labour whilst Labour gained the Wednesfield South, Oxley and Fallings Park seats from the Conservatives, the SDP/Liberal Alliance gained a Council seat beating Labour in Spring Vale.

Prior to the election the constitution of the Council was:

- Labour 34
- Conservative 24
- Alliance 1

Vacant 1

Following the election the constitution of the Council was:

- Labour 35
- Conservative 23
- Alliance 2

== Election result ==
Bilston East
Party	Candidate	Votes	%	±%
Labour	J Collingswood	1968		
Alliance	Mrs A Nightingale	1137		
Conservative	A Lewis	297		
Majority		831		

Bilston North
Party	Candidate	Votes	%	±%
Labour	J Kyte	1853		
Conservative	A Mills	1046		
Alliance	J Speakman	727		
Majority		807		

Blakenhall
Party	Candidate	Votes	%	±%
Labour	R Jones	2409		
Conservative	K Clark	1262		
Alliance	Mrs G Hammond	323		
Majority		1147		

Bushbury
Party	Candidate	Votes	%	±%
Conservative	C Brueton	1533		
Labour	S Lydon	1445		
Alliance	I Jenkins	687		
Majority		88		

East Park
Party	Candidate	Votes	%	±%
Labour	Mrs P Byrne	1920		
Conservative	M Hutt	525		
Alliance	J Hemmings	278		
Majority		1395		

Ettingshall
Party	Candidate	Votes	%	±%
Labour	A Johnson	1801		
True And Trusted Labour	T Lane	575		
Conservative	Mrs J Shore	389		
Alliance	F Bayley	249		
Majority		1233		

Fallings Park
Party	Candidate	Votes	%	±%
Labour	Mrs T Walton	2007		
Conservative	A Griffiths	1544		
Alliance	D Hislop	507		
Majority		463		

Graiseley
Party	Candidate	Votes	%	±%
Labour	J Bird	2553		
Conservative	P Windridge	1456		
Alliance	J Nock	399		
Indian Independent	S Prased	102		
Majority		1097		

Heath Town
Party	Candidate	Votes	%	±%
Labour	M McElligott	1445		
Conservative	Miss T Bradley	736		
Alliance	C Hallmark	673		
Majority		709		

Low Hill
Party	Candidate	Votes	%	±%
Labour	R Garner	1963		
Conservative	K Gliwitzki	583		
Alliance	J Thompson	268		
Majority		1380		

Merry Hill
Party	Candidate	Votes	%	±%
Conservative	R Bradley	2034		
Alliance	B Lamb	1317		
Labour	Mrs A Denham	729		
Majority		717		

Oxley
Party	Candidate	Votes	%	±%
Labour	J Clifford	2284		
Conservative	A Findlay	1537		
Alliance	G Carter	290		
Majority		747		

Park
Party	Candidate	Votes	%	±%
Conservative	R Swatman	2433		
Labour	P Plummer	1134		
Alliance	L Sherwin	540		
Majority		1299		

Penn
Party	Candidate	Votes	%	±%
Conservative	A Hart	2708		
Labour	Dr J Gabriel	731		
Alliance	J White	629		
Majority		1977		

St Peter's
Party	Candidate	Votes	%	±%
Labour	S S Duhra	2367		
Conservative	Mrs T Ling	512		
Alliance	R Gray	431		
Communist	Dr G Barnsby	86		
Majority		1855		

Spring Vale
Party	Candidate	Votes	%	±%
Alliance	R Whitehouse	2551		
Labour	N Davies	1736		
Conservative	P Nicholls	369		
Majority		815		

Tettenhall Regis
Party	Candidate	Votes	%	±%
Conservative	Mrs D Seiboth	2076		
Alliance	Mrs J Aubrey	1346		
Labour	P Pittam	521		
Majority		730		

Tettenhall Wightwick
Party	Candidate	Votes	%	±%
Conservative	A Rissbrook	2403		
Alliance	D Pottle	874		
Labour	Mrs B Hill	605		
Majority		1529		

Wednesfield North
Party	Candidate	Votes	%	±%
Labour	P Bateman	2114		
Conservative	R Woodhouse	1376		
Alliance	M Pearson	629		
Majority		738		

Wednesfield South
Party	Candidate	Votes	%	±%
Labour	B Servian	2112		
Conservative	B Findlay	1370		
Alliance	E George	365		
Majority		742		
