= 1984 Scottish local elections =

- 3 May 1984
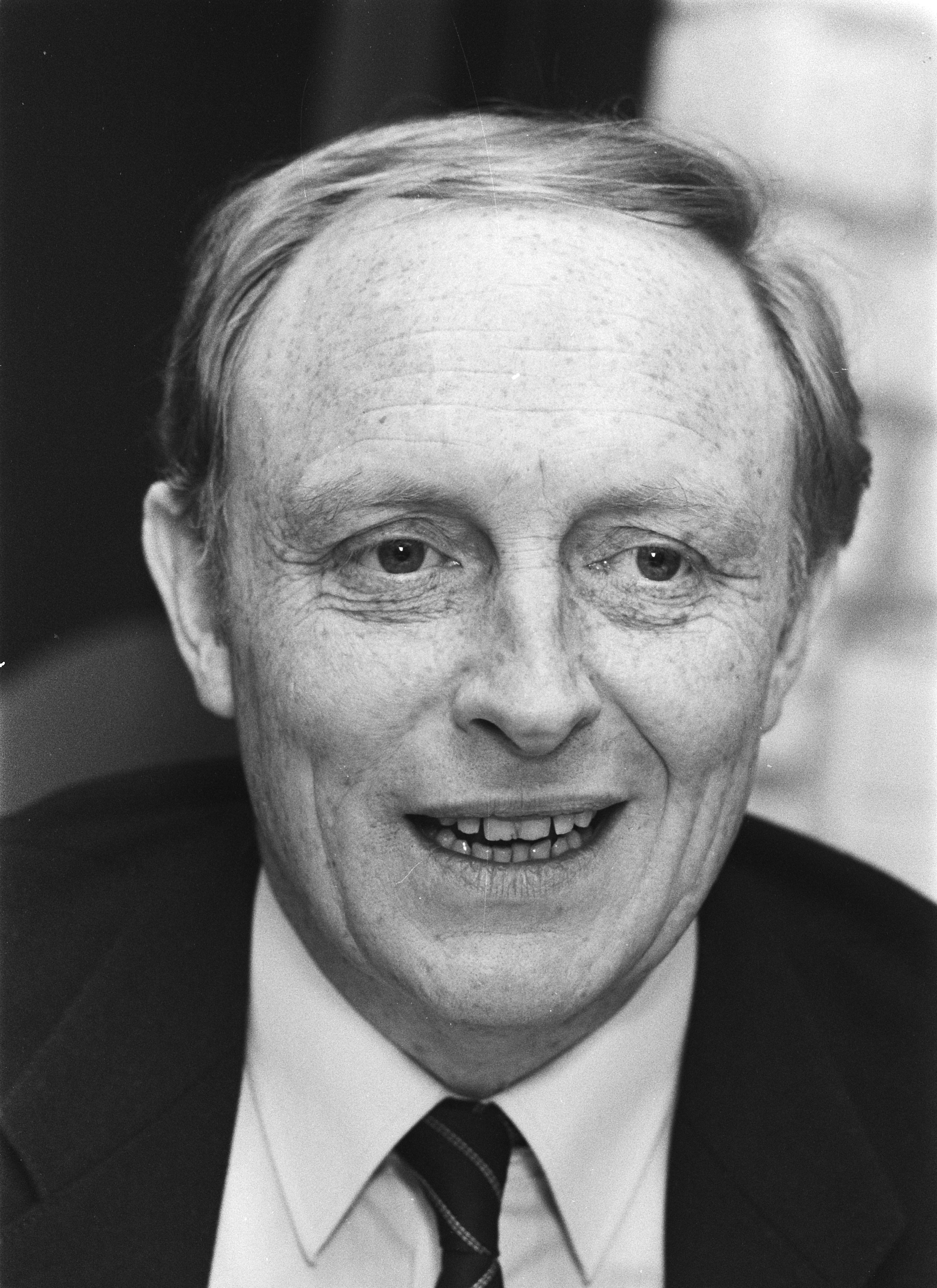

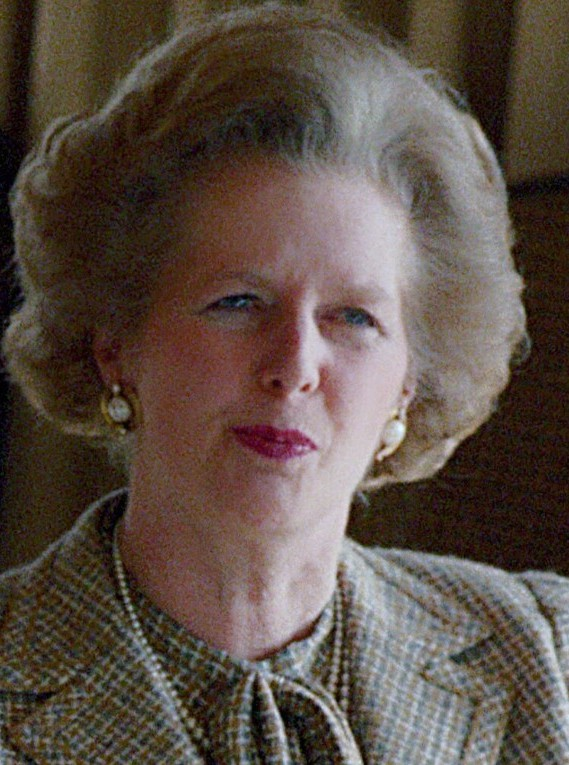

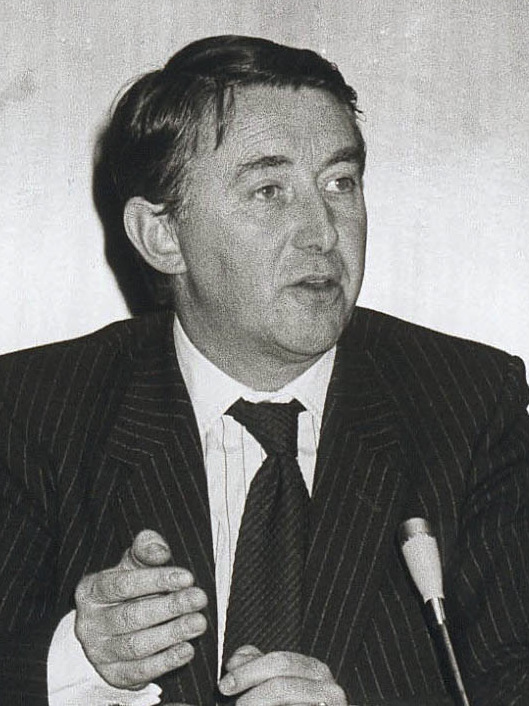

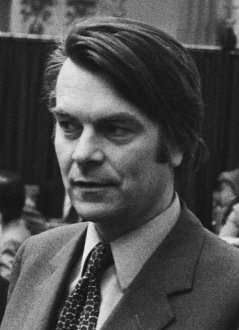

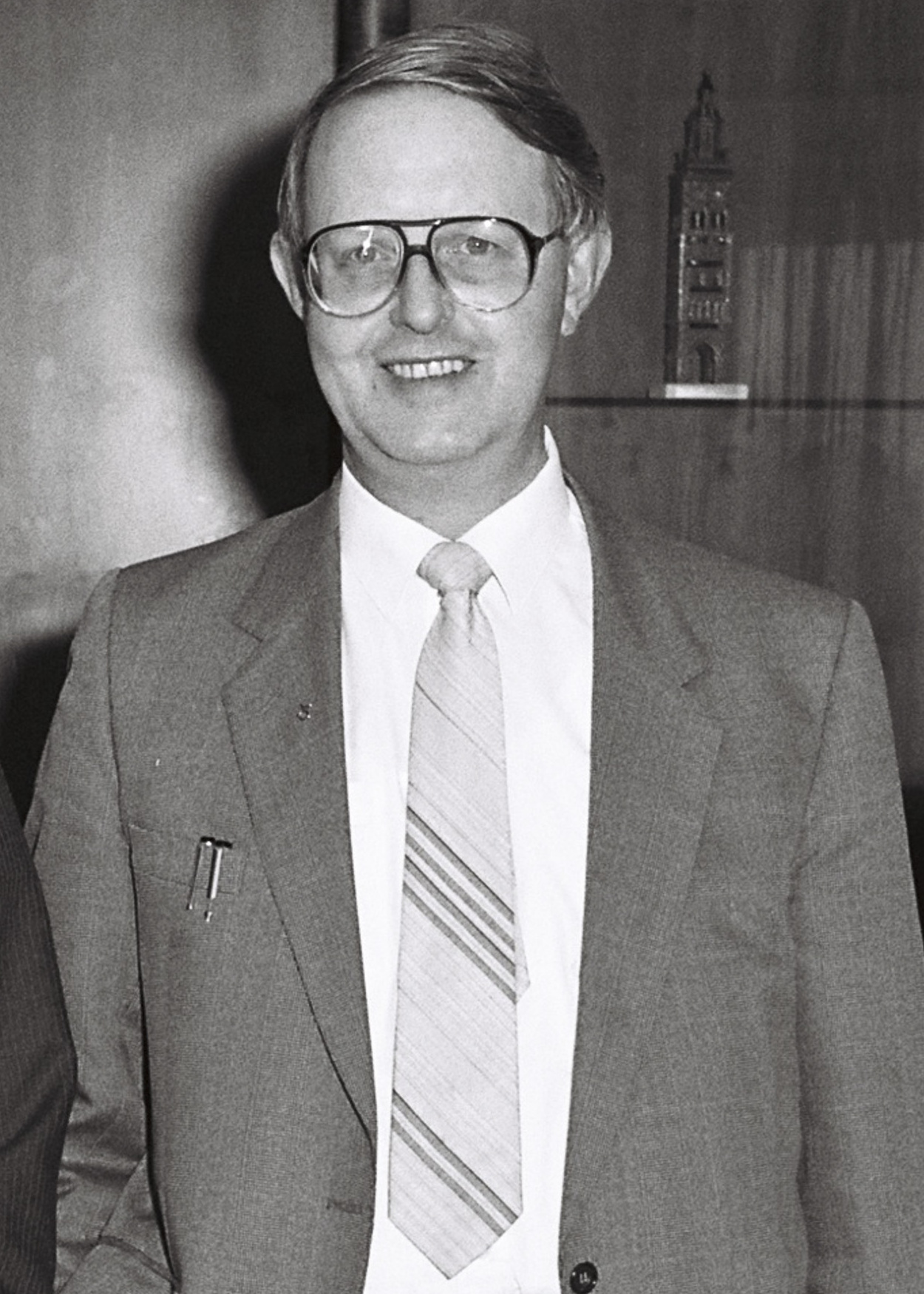
	First party	Second party
Leader	Neil Kinnock	Margaret Thatcher
Party	Labour	Conservative
Leader since	2 October 1983	11 February 1975
Seats won	545	189
Seat change	▲76	▼43
Percentage	45.7%	21.4%
Swing	▲0.3%	▼2.7%
	Third party	Fourth party
Leader	David Steel (Lib.); David Owen (SDP)	Gordon Wilson
Party	Alliance	SNP
Leader since	7 July 1976 (Steel); 21 June 1983 (Owen)	15 September 1979
Seats won	78	59
Seat change	▲45	▲7
Percentage	12.8%	11.7%
Swing	▲6.6%	▼3.8%
- Colours denote the winning party with outright control

Local elections were held in Scotland on Thursday 3 May 1984, to elect members to all 53 district councils under the Local Government (Scotland) Act 1973, which had established the two-tier system of regions and districts. This was the first election to take place after the 1983 general election landslide victory for the Conservatives. The local elections resulted in the Labour Party taking control of the City of Edinburgh District Council for the first time.

== National results ==
Summary of the 1984 Scottish district council election results
Parties	Votes	Votes %	Wards
Labour		45.7	545
Conservative		21.4	189
Alliance		12.8	78
SNP		11.7	59
Independent		6.8	267
Other			
Total		n/a	~1158

== Results by region ==
The numbers of seats on each council before and after the election were as follows:

=== Borders ===
District	Labour	Conservative	Liberal & SDP	Independent	Control
Berwickshire	0	8 (-3)	SDP 1	0	Conservative hold
Ettrick and Lauderdale	2 (+1)	1 (-1)	0	13	Independent hold
Roxburgh	0	5	Lib 3 (+2); SDP 1	7 (-2)	Independents lose to NOC
Tweeddale	0	0	0	10	Independent hold

=== Central ===
District	Labour	Conservative	SNP	Independent	Control
Clackmannan	7 (+3)	1	2 (-3)	0	Labour hold
Falkirk	25 (+1)	2 (-1)	7 (+1)	2 (-1)	Labour hold
Stirling	11 (+1)	8 (-1)	0	1	Labour hold

=== Dumfries and Galloway ===
District	Labour	Conservative	SNP	Liberal	Independent	Other	Control
Annandale and Eskdale	0	0	0	4 (+4)	12 (-4)	0	Independent hold
Nithsdale	6 (+1)	7 (+1)	7 (+1)	0	7 (-4)	Independent Labour 1 (+1)	No Overall Control
Stewartry	0	0	0	0	12	0	Independent hold
Wigtown	0	0	1 (+1)	0	13 (-1)	0	Independent hold

=== Fife ===
District	Labour	Conservative	SNP	Liberal & SDP	Independent	Other	Control
Dunfermline‡	24	2	1	Lib 3 SDP 3	0	Communist 1	Labour hold
Kirkcaldy‡	30	3	1	SDP 2 Lib 1	2	Ratepayers 1	Labour hold
North-East Fife	0	6 (-4)	0	Liberal 10 (+4)	2	0	Liberal gain from Conservatives

‡ New ward boundaries

=== Grampian ===
District	Labour	Conservative	SNP	Liberal	Independent	Control
Banff and Buchan	0	2 (+1)	5	0	11 (-1)	Independent hold
City of Aberdeen‡	28	8	0	14	0	Labour hold
Gordon	0	3 (-1)	0	2 (+1)	7	Independent hold
Kincardine and Deeside	0	3	1	1	7	Independent hold
Moray	1 (+1)	0	2 (+1)	0	15 (-2)	Independent hold

=== Highland ===
District	Labour	Conservative	SNP	Liberal & SDP	Independent	Other	Control
Badenoch and Strathspey‡ 1 vacancy	0	0	1	0	9	0	Independent hold
Caithness 1 vacancy	0	0	0	Lib 1	14	0	Independent hold
Inverness‡	8 (-1)	0	0	Lib 2	18 (+1)	0	Independent hold
Lochaber‡	5	0	0	0	8	Independent Labour 2	Independent hold
Nairn	1 (+1)	0	0	0	9 (-1)	0	Independent hold
Ross and Cromarty‡ 1 vacancy	2	1	0	0	18	0	Independent hold
Skye and Lochalsh	0	0	0	SDP 1 (+1)	10 (-1)	0	Independent hold
Sutherland	0	0	0	0	14	0	Independent hold

‡ Changes in ward boundaries

=== Lothian ===
District	Labour	Conservative	SNP	Liberal	Independent	Control	Details
City of Edinburgh	34 (+8)	22 (-9)	2	4 (+3)	0 (-2)	Labour gain from NOC	Details
East Lothian	11 (+1)	6(-1)	0	0	0	Labour hold	
Midlothian	14 (+1)	1	0	1	0 (-1)	Labour hold	
West Lothian‡	19	0	2	0	3	Labour hold	

‡ Changes in ward boundaries

=== Strathclyde ===
District	Labour	Conservative	SNP	Liberal & SDP	Independent	Others	Control
Argyll and Bute	0	1	1	0	24	0	Independent hold
Bearsden and Milngavie	1 (-1)	6 (-1)	0	Lib 2 (+2)	1	0	Conservative hold
Clydebank‡	11	1	0	0	0	0	Labour hold
Clydesdale	7	0	3	0	6	0	NOC
Cumbernauld and Kilsyth‡	8	0	4	0	0	0	Labour hold
Cumnock and Doon Valley	10 (+1)	0	0	0	0 (-1)	0	Labour hold
Cunninghame	23 (+2)	5	2 (-2)	0	0	0	Labour hold
Dumbarton‡	11	2	0	SDP 1	2	0	Labour hold
East Kilbride‡	14	2	0	0	0	0	Labour hold
Eastwood	0	10	0	0	2	0	Conservative hold
City of Glasgow	59	5 (-1)	0	Lib 2 (+1)	0	0	Labour hold
Hamilton	17	1	0	Lib 2	0	0	Labour hold
Inverclyde‡	11	0	0	Lib 9	0	0	Labour hold
Kilmarnock and Loudoun‡	14	3	1	0	0	0	Labour hold
Kyle and Carrick	12 (-1)	13 (+1)	0	0	0	0	Conservative gain from Labour
Motherwell‡	24	2	2	0	1	Communist 1	Labour hold
Monklands‡	18	2	0	0	0	0	Labour hold
Renfrew	35	5	3	Lib 1 SDP 1	0	0	Labour hold
Strathkelvin‡	11	4	0	0	0	0	Labour hold

‡ New ward boundaries.

=== Tayside ===
District	Labour	Conservative	SNP	Liberal & SDP	Independent	Others	Control
Angus‡	0(-3)	8(-4)	11	0	2	0	SNP gain from NOC
City of Dundee	25	15 (-2)	2 (+2)	Lib 1 (+1); SDP 1 (+1)	0 (-1)	0	Labour hold
Perth and Kinross	6	14 (-4)	Lib 3 (+2); SDP1 (+1)	1 (+1)	4 (+1)	0	Conservatives lose to NOC
