= West Dorset District Council elections =

Local government elections in Dorset, England

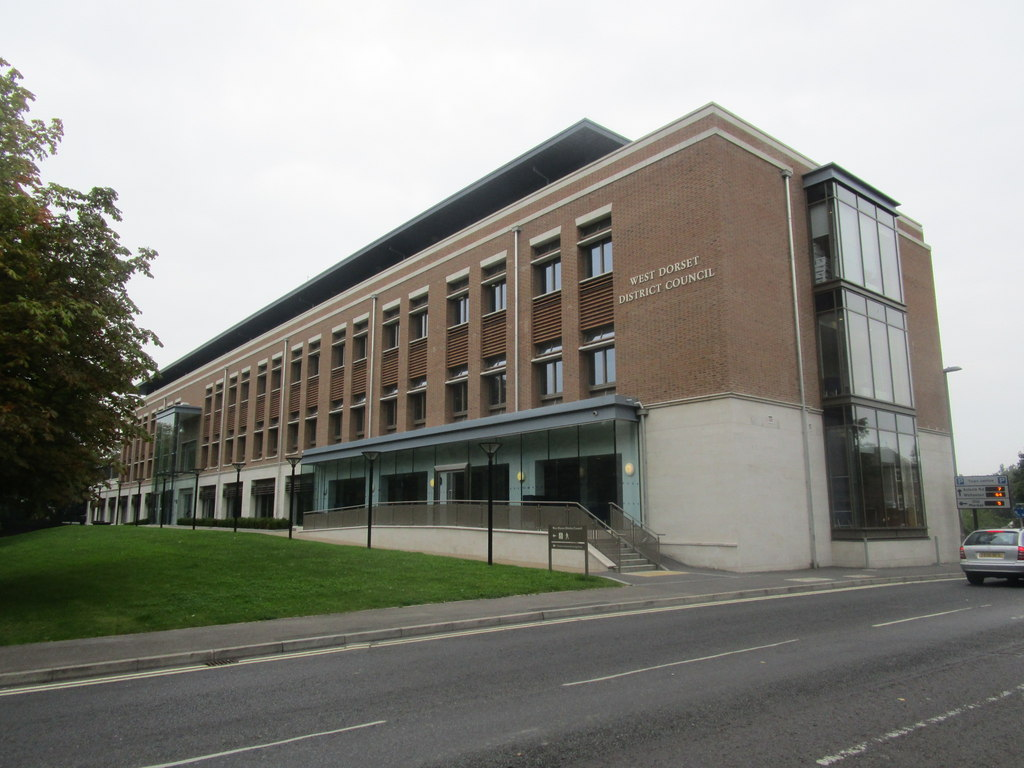
South Walks House in Dorchester, headquarters of West Dorset District Council

West Dorset District Council in Dorset, England existed from 1974 to 2019. The council was abolished and subsumed into Dorset Council in 2019.

== Political control ==
The first elections to the council were held in 1973, initially operating as a shadow authority prior to the district coming into effect the following year. From 1973 until its abolition in 2019 political control of the council was held by the following parties:

Party	Tenure
Independent	1973–1987
No overall control	1987–2003
Conservative	2003–2019

=== Leadership ===
The leaders of the council from 2001 until the council's abolition in 2019 were:

Councillor	Party	From	To
Gwyn Pritchard	Conservative	May 2001	May 2004
Robert Gould	Conservative	May 2004	8 Jan 2015
Anthony Alford	Conservative	8 Jan 2015	31 Mar 2019

== Council elections ==
- 1973 West Dorset District Council election
- 1976 West Dorset District Council election
- 1979 West Dorset District Council election
- 1983 West Dorset District Council election (New ward boundaries)
- 1984 West Dorset District Council election
- 1986 West Dorset District Council election
- 1987 West Dorset District Council election
- 1991 West Dorset District Council election (District boundary changes took place but the number of seats remained the same)
- 1995 West Dorset District Council election
- 1999 West Dorset District Council election

Year	Conservative	Liberal Democrats	Independent	Notes
2003	25	12	11	(New ward boundaries)
2007	26	16	6	
2011	32	11	5	
2015	30	12	0	(New ward boundaries)

== District result maps ==
2003 results map

2007 results map

2011 results map

2015 results map

== By-election results ==
By-elections occur when seats become vacant between council elections. Below is a summary of by-elections from 1997 to 2019; full by-election results can be found by clicking on the by-election name.

By-election	Date	Incumbent party	Winning party
Thorncombe by-election	17 April 1997	Conservative	Conservative
Bridport South by-election (2 seats)	1 May 1997	Labour	Labour
Bridport South by-election (2 seats)	1 May 1997	Independent	Conservative
Yetminster by-election	1 May 1997	Liberal Democrats	Conservative
Chickerell by-election	10 July 1997	Conservative	Liberal Democrats
Cam Vale by-election	2 May 2013	Conservative	Conservative
Piddle Valley by-election	13 April 2017	Conservative	Conservative
Lyme Regis & Charmouth by-election	14 September 2017	Conservative	Independent
Bridport North by-election	22 February 2018	Liberal Democrats	Conservative
