= 1979 West Dorset District Council election =

1979 UK local government election

← 1976	3 May 1979	1983 →

All 55 seats to West Dorset District Council 28 seats needed for a majority
	First party	Second party	Third party
	Ind	Lib	Con
Party	Independent	Liberal	Conservative
Last election	45 seats, 56.9%	7 seats, 29.1%	1 seat, 3.8%
Seats won	37	8	7
Seat change	▼8	▲1	▲6
Popular vote	26,323	15,502	13,052
Percentage	42.1%	24.8%	20.9%
Swing	▼14.8%	▼4.3%	▲17.1%
	Fourth party	Fifth party
	Lab	IndC
Party	Labour	Ind. Conservative
Last election	1 seat, 9.5%	1 seat, 0.7%
Seats won	2	1
Seat change	▲1	Steady
Popular vote	6,768	836
Percentage	10.8%	1.3%
Swing	▲1.3%	▲0.6%
Council control before election
Independent
Council control after election
Independent

The 1979 West Dorset District Council election was held on Thursday 3 May 1979 to elect councillors to West Dorset District Council in England. It took place on the same day as the general election and other district council elections in the United Kingdom. This was the third election to the district council, the election saw terms of councillors extended from three to four years.

The 1979 election saw the Independent councillors maintain their majority control on the Council.

== Ward results ==
=== Beaminster ===
Beaminster (2 seats)
Party	Candidate	Votes	%	±%
Independent	R. Bugler *	1,384	–	N/A
Independent	A. Hudson *	1,252	–	N/A
Independent	S. Davies	609	–	N/A
Turnout			78.0	N/A
Registered electors		2,503		
Independent hold				
Independent hold				

=== Bothenhampton ===
Bothenhampton
Party	Candidate	Votes	%	±%
Independent	Y. Skyrme *	unopposed	N/A	N/A
Registered electors		1,427		
Independent hold				

=== Bradford Abbas ===
Bradford Abbas
Party	Candidate	Votes	%	±%
Independent	E. Garrett *	unopposed	N/A	N/A
Registered electors		1,272		
Independent hold				

=== Bradpole ===
Bradpole
Party	Candidate	Votes	%	±%
Ind. Conservative	R. Coatsworth *	612	59.7	N/A
Independent	D. Cash	413	40.3	N/A
Majority		199	19.4	N/A
Turnout			76.7	+23.6
Registered electors		1,337		
Ind. Conservative gain from Independent		Swing		

=== Bridport ===
Bridport (5 seats)
Party	Candidate	Votes	%	±%
Liberal	A. Bell	2,601	47.1	+13.1
Liberal	A. Tiltman *	1,854	–	
Independent	C. Samways *	1,463	–	
Labour	L. Dibden *	1,457	26.4	–1.5
Independent	E. Andrews	1,344	–	N/A
Independent	P. Norfolk *	1,305	–	
Independent	W. Hicks *	1,112	–	N/A
Turnout			74.3	+34.1
Registered electors		5,453		
Liberal hold		Swing		
Liberal gain from Independent		Swing		
Independent hold		Swing		
Labour hold		Swing		
Independent gain from Independent		Swing		

=== Broadmayne ===
Broadmayne
Party	Candidate	Votes	%	±%
Liberal	B. Course *	665	64.9	+10.3
Conservative	D. Blake	359	35.1	N/A
Majority		306	29.9	+20.7
Turnout			78.9	+35.5
Registered electors		1,320		
Liberal hold		Swing		

=== Broadwindsor ===
Broadwindsor
Party	Candidate	Votes	%	±%
Independent	C. Coate *	unopposed	N/A	N/A
Registered electors		1,007		
Independent hold				

=== Burton Bradstock ===
Burton Bradstock
Party	Candidate	Votes	%	±%
Independent	R. Bailey	628	75.2	N/A
Independent	J. Bethell	207	24.8	N/A
Majority		421	50.4	N/A
Turnout			73.3	N/A
Registered electors		1,146		
Independent gain from Independent				

=== Caundle Vale ===
Caundle Vale
Party	Candidate	Votes	%	±%
Independent	N. White *	unopposed	N/A	N/A
Registered electors		998		
Independent hold				

=== Cerne Valley ===
Cerne Valley
Party	Candidate	Votes	%	±%
Independent	Dione Digby, Lady Digby *	unopposed	N/A	N/A
Registered electors		1,056		
Independent hold				

=== Charminster ===
Charminster
Party	Candidate	Votes	%	±%
Independent	E. Hanford *	unopposed	N/A	N/A
Registered electors		1,255		
Independent hold				

=== Charmouth ===
Charmouth
Party	Candidate	Votes	%	±%
Independent	W. McLellan *	unopposed	N/A	N/A
Registered electors		1,177		
Independent hold				

=== Chesil Bank ===
Chesil Bank
Party	Candidate	Votes	%	±%
Independent	M. Pengelly *	unopposed	N/A	N/A
Registered electors		1,040		
Independent hold				

=== Chickerell ===
Chickerell (2 seats)
Party	Candidate	Votes	%	±%
Independent	W. McCarthy *	unopposed	N/A	N/A
Conservative	E. Edwards-Stuart	unopposed	N/A	N/A
Registered electors		2,809		
Independent hold				
Conservative gain from Independent				

=== Dorchester Central ===
Dorchester Central
Party	Candidate	Votes	%	±%
Independent	L. Phillips *	unopposed	N/A	N/A
Registered electors		908		
Independent hold				

=== Dorchester East ===
Dorchester East (4 seats)
Party	Candidate	Votes	%	±%
Liberal	Enid Stella Jones *	2,204	58.2	+29.0
Conservative	P. Seaton *	1,586	41.8	+7.5
Liberal	H. Nicholson	1,570	–	
Conservative	R. Collins *	1,503	–	
Conservative	H. Attryde	1,235	–	
Conservative	A. Beard	1,129	–	
Turnout			81.4	+30.8
Registered electors		4,237		
Liberal hold		Swing		
Conservative hold		Swing		
Liberal gain from Independent		Swing		
Conservative gain from Independent		Swing		

=== Dorchester West ===
Dorchester West (5 seats)
Party	Candidate	Votes	%	±%
Liberal	David Trevor Jones *	2,208	32.1	–4.7
Conservative	C. Lucas *	1,859	27.0	N/A
Independent	G. Powell *	1,759	–	
Liberal	E. Boothman *	1,726	–	
Conservative	F. Alderman	1,535	–	
Conservative	I. McLellan	1,353	–	
Independent	P. Adams	1,224	–	N/A
Labour	G. Standfield	1,051	15.3	–4.7
Labour	K. Matthews	816	–	
Labour	S. Minto	671	–	
Labour	E. Salholm	578	–	
Turnout			76.4	+29.2
Registered electors		5,552		
Liberal hold		Swing		
Conservative gain from Independent		Swing		
Independent hold		Swing		
Liberal hold		Swing		
Conservative gain from Independent		Swing		

=== Frome Valley ===
Frome Valley
Party	Candidate	Votes	%	±%
Independent	B. Bryant *	unopposed	N/A	N/A
Registered electors		994		
Independent hold				

=== Halstock ===
Halstock
Party	Candidate	Votes	%	±%
Independent	T. Frost *	unopposed	N/A	N/A
Registered electors		1,163		
Independent hold				

=== Holnest ===
Holnest
Party	Candidate	Votes	%	±%
Independent	M. Cockburn *	unopposed	N/A	N/A
Registered electors		1,141		
Independent hold				

=== Loders ===
Loders
Party	Candidate	Votes	%	±%
Independent	A. Adams	345	47.1	N/A
Conservative	D. Fry	258	35.2	N/A
Independent	M. West	130	17.7	N/A
Majority		87	11.9	N/A
Turnout			77.2	N/A
Registered electors		950		
Independent gain from Independent		Swing		

=== Lyme Regis ===
Lyme Regis (3 seats)
Party	Candidate	Votes	%	±%
Independent	J. Broom *	1,409	–	
Independent	J. Nuttall *	1,314	–	
Independent	V. Homyer	1,001	–	
Independent	E. Hallett *	970	–	
Turnout			77.6	+24.9
Registered electors		2,870		
Independent hold		Swing		
Independent hold		Swing		
Independent gain from Independent		Swing		

=== Maiden Newton ===
Maiden Newton
Party	Candidate	Votes	%	±%
Independent	H. Haward *	unopposed	N/A	N/A
Registered electors		996		
Independent hold				

=== Netherbury ===
Netherbury
Party	Candidate	Votes	%	±%
Independent	C. Poole *	unopposed	N/A	N/A
Registered electors		1,224		
Independent hold				

=== Owermoigne ===
Owermoigne
Party	Candidate	Votes	%	±%
Independent	R. Symes *	unopposed	N/A	N/A
Registered electors		1,239		
Independent hold				

=== Piddle Valley ===
Piddle Valley
Party	Candidate	Votes	%	±%
Independent	M. Walker	666	80.2	+43.4
Independent	D. Barrs	164	19.8	N/A
Majority		502	60.5	N/A
Turnout			73.4	+16.2
Registered electors		1,131		
Independent gain from Independent		Swing		

=== Puddletown ===
Puddletown
Party	Candidate	Votes	%	±%
Independent	A. Banfield	509	77.8	N/A
Labour	E. Adams	145	22.2	N/A
Majority		364	55.6	N/A
Turnout			75.5	+24.4
Registered electors		867		
Independent gain from Independent		Swing		

=== Queen Thorne ===
Queen Thorne
Party	Candidate	Votes	%	±%
Independent	J. Brewer *	643	75.0	N/A
Conservative	G. Burgess	214	25.0	N/A
Majority		429	50.1	N/A
Turnout			78.4	N/A
Registered electors		1,093		
Independent hold				

=== Sherborne ===
Sherborne (5 seats)
Party	Candidate	Votes	%	±%
Liberal	M. Matson *	2,674	30.3	N/A
Independent	E. Dyke *	2,081	–	N/A
Independent	E. King *	2,073	–	N/A
Labour	E. Noake	2,050	23.2	N/A
Conservative	R. Farrant *	2,021	22.9	N/A
Independent	R. Ludd	1,569	–	N/A
Registered electors		5,932		
Liberal hold				
Independent hold				
Independent hold				
Labour gain from Liberal				
Conservative gain from Independent				

=== Stinsford ===
Stinsford
Party	Candidate	Votes	%	±%
Independent	L. Coleman *	unopposed	N/A	N/A
Registered electors		824		
Independent hold				

=== Symondsbury ===
Symondsbury
Party	Candidate	Votes	%	±%
Independent	G. Summers *	unopposed	N/A	N/A
Registered electors		1,156		
Independent hold				

=== Thorncombe ===
Thorncombe
Party	Candidate	Votes	%	±%
Independent	P. Atyeo *	unopposed	N/A	N/A
Registered electors		1,013		
Independent hold				

=== Tolpuddle ===
Tolpuddle
Party	Candidate	Votes	%	±%
Independent	M. Kraft *	unopposed	N/A	N/A
Registered electors		713		
Independent hold				

=== Whitchurch Canonicorum ===
Whitchurch Canonicorum
Party	Candidate	Votes	%	±%
Independent	W. Fowell *	unopposed	N/A	N/A
Registered electors		1,113		
Independent hold				

=== Winterborne St Martin ===
Winterborne St Martin
Party	Candidate	Votes	%	±%
Independent	S. Slade *	620	73.5	N/A
Ind. Conservative	G. Duke	224	26.5	N/A
Majority		436	46.9	N/A
Turnout			83.3	N/A
Registered electors		1,029		
Independent hold				

=== Yetminster ===
Yetminster
Party	Candidate	Votes	%	±%
Conservative	W. Anderson *	unopposed	N/A	N/A
Registered electors		1,156		
Conservative gain from Ind. Conservative				
