= 1999 West Dorset District Council election =

1999 UK local government election

← 1995	6 May 1999	2003 →

All 55 seats to West Dorset District Council 28 seats needed for a majority
	First party	Second party
	Con	LD
Party	Conservative	Liberal Democrats
Last election	18 seats, 24.8%	13 seats, 34.6%
Seats won	22	15
Seat change	▲4	▲2
Popular vote	15,438	15,185
Percentage	35.6%	35.0%
Swing	▲10.8%	▲0.4%
	Third party	Fourth party
	Ind	Lab
Party	Independent	Labour
Last election	18 seats, 12.9%	5 seats, 19.6%
Seats won	14	4
Seat change	▼4	▼1
Popular vote	8,113	4,634
Percentage	18.7%	10.7%
Swing	▼5.8%	▼8.9%
Council control before election
No overall control
Council control after election
No overall control

The 1999 West Dorset District Council election was held on Thursday 6 May 1999 to elect councillors to West Dorset District Council in England. It took place on the same day as other district council elections in the United Kingdom. The entire council was up for election.

The 1999 election saw the Conservatives become the largest party on the council but fall short of a majority.

== Ward results ==
=== Beaminster ===
Beaminster (2 seats)
Party	Candidate	Votes	%	±%
Liberal Democrats	F. Streets *	795	39.1	+5.5
Conservative	V. Ivory	768	37.8	+12.7
Independent	D. Wenn	470	23.1	N/A
Turnout			57.0	–14.8
Registered electors		3,230		
Liberal Democrats hold		Swing		
Conservative gain from Independent		Swing		

=== Bothenhampton ===
Bothenhampton
Party	Candidate	Votes	%	±%
Conservative	G. Pritchard *	429	56.1	–4.2
Liberal Democrats	D. Tett	336	43.9	N/A
Majority		93	12.2	–8.3
Turnout			43.7	–7.9
Registered electors		1,754		
Conservative hold		Swing		

=== Bradford Abbas ===
Bradford Abbas
Party	Candidate	Votes	%	±%
Independent	E. Garrett *	417	58.3	N/A
Independent	J. Greene	160	22.4	N/A
Liberal Democrats	S. Hewson	138	19.3	N/A
Majority		257	35.9	N/A
Turnout			47.7	N/A
Registered electors		1,499		
Independent hold				

=== Bradpole ===
Bradpole
Party	Candidate	Votes	%	±%
Independent	R. Coatsworth *	unopposed	N/A	N/A
Registered electors		1,869		
Independent hold				

=== Bridport North ===
Bridport North (3 seats)
Party	Candidate	Votes	%	±%
Labour	L. Dibdin *	611	36.3	–4.3
Liberal Democrats	R. Draper *	554	32.9	+1.2
Conservative	B. Rowe *	520	30.9	+3.2
Liberal Democrats	J. Shaw	471	–	
Turnout			33.6	–9.1
Registered electors		3,322		
Labour hold		Swing		
Liberal Democrats hold		Swing		
Conservative hold		Swing		

=== Bridport South ===
Bridport South (2 seats)
Party	Candidate	Votes	%	±%
Conservative	S. Brown	392	39.0	+16.6
Labour	C. Wild	372	37.1	–0.1
Conservative	H. Samuel	260	–	
Liberal Democrats	B. Wheeler	240	23.9	+10.3
Liberal Democrats	S. Bagnell	212	–	
Turnout			32.6	–20.9
Registered electors		2,625		
Conservative gain from Independent		Swing		
Labour hold		Swing		

=== Broadmayne ===
Broadmayne
Party	Candidate	Votes	%	±%
Independent	A. Thacker *	459	84.7	N/A
Labour	C. Austen	83	15.3	N/A
Majority		376	69.4	N/A
Turnout			35.1	N/A
Registered electors		1,560		
Independent hold				

=== Broadwindsor ===
Broadwindsor
Party	Candidate	Votes	%	±%
Conservative	L. Sewell	336	63.9	N/A
Liberal Democrats	S. Gibbs	190	36.1	N/A
Majority		146	27.8	N/A
Turnout			44.0	N/A
Registered electors		1,203		
Conservative gain from Liberal Democrats				

=== Burton Bradstock ===
Burton Bradstock
Party	Candidate	Votes	%	±%
Conservative	M. Pritchard *	437	59.0	N/A
Liberal Democrats	S. Marshall	304	41.0	N/A
Majority		133	17.9	N/A
Turnout			56.2	N/A
Registered electors		1,325		
Conservative hold				

=== Caundle Vale ===
Caundle Vale
Party	Candidate	Votes	%	±%
Conservative	P. Sargent	229	51.3	N/A
Liberal Democrats	E. Compton	217	48.7	+1.1
Majority		12	2.7	N/A
Turnout			41.6	–7.3
Registered electors		1,075		
Conservative gain from Independent		Swing		

=== Cerne Valley ===
Cerne Valley
Party	Candidate	Votes	%	±%
Independent	R. Stenhouse *	unopposed	N/A	N/A
Registered electors		1,323		
Independent hold				

=== Charminster ===
Charminster
Party	Candidate	Votes	%	±%
Conservative	S. East	336	49.7	N/A
Liberal Democrats	A. Chisholm	239	36.4	N/A
Labour	L. Ahern	91	13.9	N/A
Majority		97	13.3	N/A
Turnout			52.5	N/A
Registered electors		1,253		
Conservative hold				

=== Charmouth ===
Charmouth
Party	Candidate	Votes	%	±%
Independent	D. Newson	286	45.4	N/A
Conservative	G. Brierley	255	40.5	N/A
Labour	J. Everington	89	14.1	N/A
Majority		31	4.9	N/A
Turnout			42.4	N/A
Registered electors		1,493		
Independent gain from Independent				

=== Chesil Bank ===
Chesil Bank
Party	Candidate	Votes	%	±%
Independent	E. Topliss	361	57.9	N/A
Conservative	C. Grove	262	42.1	N/A
Majority		99	15.9	N/A
Turnout			44.8	N/A
Registered electors		1,397		
Independent gain from Independent				

=== Chickerell ===
Chickerell (2 seats)
Party	Candidate	Votes	%	±%
Liberal Democrats	S. Sawtell	844	76.7	N/A
Liberal Democrats	I. Gardner *	676	–	
Labour	R. Hyde	257	23.3	N/A
Labour	R. Kiss	205	–	
Turnout			27.6	N/A
Registered electors		4,067		
Liberal Democrats gain from Conservative				
Liberal Democrats gain from Independent				

=== Dorchester East ===
Dorchester East (2 seats)
Party	Candidate	Votes	%	±%
Liberal Democrats	Enid Stella Jones *	614	52.3	–23.2
Liberal Democrats	T. Harries *	470	–	
Conservative	J. Pike	296	25.2	+0.7
Labour	L. Kiss	263	22.4	N/A
Turnout			31.9	–3.8
Registered electors		3,100		
Liberal Democrats hold		Swing		
Liberal Democrats hold		Swing		

=== Dorchester North ===
Dorchester North (2 seats)
Party	Candidate	Votes	%	±%
Liberal Democrats	R. Biggs *	463	34.1	+5.9
Independent	D. Barrett *	393	29.0	N/A
Conservative	M. Ansell	265	19.5	N/A
Labour	P. Paul	236	17.4	–3.7
Conservative	A. Richards	214	–	
Turnout			39.8	–7.2
Registered electors		2,261		
Liberal Democrats hold		Swing		
Independent gain from Independent		Swing		

=== Dorchester South ===
Dorchester South (3 seats)
Party	Candidate	Votes	%	±%
Liberal Democrats	M. Rennie *	823	35.4	–7.1
Liberal Democrats	H. Dowell *	786	–	
Liberal Democrats	D. Maggs *	722	–	
Conservative	C. Grassby	656	28.2	+5.6
Independent	K. Lambert	604	26.0	–8.9
Conservative	R. Martindale	542	–	
Conservative	C. Reed	437	–	
Labour	R. Brereton	243	10.4	N/A
Turnout			43.6	–1.4
Registered electors		3,981		
Liberal Democrats hold		Swing		
Liberal Democrats hold		Swing		
Liberal Democrats hold		Swing		

=== Dorchester West ===
Dorchester West (3 seats)
Party	Candidate	Votes	%	±%
Labour	J. Antell *	851	44.9	–6.4
Labour	W. Gundry *	673	–	
Liberal Democrats	David Trevor Jones *	673	35.5	+3.9
Liberal Democrats	Andrew James Canning	447	–	
Conservative	P. Graham	370	19.5	+2.4
Liberal Democrats	R. Potter	369	–	
Conservative	B. Pankhurst	325	–	
Turnout			41.6	–4.7
Registered electors		3,381		
Labour hold		Swing		
Labour hold		Swing		
Liberal Democrats hold		Swing		

=== Frome Valley ===
Frome Valley
Party	Candidate	Votes	%	±%
Independent	M. Penfold *	unopposed	N/A	N/A
Registered electors		1,288		
Independent hold				

=== Halstock ===
Halstock
Party	Candidate	Votes	%	±%
Independent	T. Frost *	397	64.8	N/A
Liberal Democrats	B. Dearlove	216	35.2	N/A
Majority		181	29.5	N/A
Turnout			45.9	N/A
Registered electors		1,339		
Independent hold				

=== Holnest ===
Holnest
Party	Candidate	Votes	%	±%
Liberal Democrats	S. Friar *	450	66.8	–2.4
Conservative	C. Etherington	224	33.2	+2.4
Majority		226	33.5	–4.9
Turnout			52.1	–5.9
Registered electors		1,305		
Liberal Democrats hold		Swing		

=== Loders ===
Loders
Party	Candidate	Votes	%	±%
Conservative	E. Bryan	unopposed	N/A	N/A
Registered electors		1,142		
Conservative hold				

=== Lyme Regis ===
Lyme Regis (3 seats)
Party	Candidate	Votes	%	±%
Independent	O. Lovell *	792	–	
Conservative	K. Meech	602	31.1	–6.4
Liberal Democrats	S. Hicks	539	27.9	+20.2
Independent	K. Whetlor	455	–	
Conservative	S. Poupard *	386	–	
Independent	S. Hogg	309	–	N/A
Turnout			40.0	+1.0
Registered electors		3,218		
Independent hold		Swing		
Conservative hold		Swing		
Liberal Democrats gain from Independent		Swing		

=== Maiden Newton ===
Maiden Newton
Party	Candidate	Votes	%	±%
Independent	E. Harris *	406	72.4	–0.4
Conservative	C. Davies	155	27.6	+0.4
Majority		251	44.7	–0.9
Turnout			45.5	–5.5
Registered electors		1,246		
Independent hold		Swing		

=== Netherbury ===
Netherbury
Party	Candidate	Votes	%	±%
Conservative	G. Haynes *	333	52.0	+1.3
Liberal Democrats	R. Pawley	307	48.0	N/A
Majority		26	4.1	+2.7
Turnout			43.0	+1.0
Registered electors		1,493		
Conservative hold		Swing		

=== Owermoigne ===
Owermoigne (2 seats)
Party	Candidate	Votes	%	±%
Conservative	D. Smy	605	46.3	N/A
Conservative	T. Seall	561	–	
Independent	J. Shuttleworth *	439	33.6	N/A
Labour	E. Austen	264	20.2	N/A
Turnout			39.9	N/A
Registered electors		2,718		
Conservative hold				
Conservative gain from SDP				

=== Piddle Valley ===
Piddle Valley
Party	Candidate	Votes	%	±%
Conservative	J. Boughey *	unopposed	N/A	N/A
Registered electors		1,490		
Conservative hold				

=== Puddletown ===
Puddletown
Party	Candidate	Votes	%	±%
Conservative	G. Harries *	206	39.5	N/A
Independent	T. Pearce	186	35.7	N/A
Liberal Democrats	M. Lane	79	15.2	N/A
Labour	O. Trevett	50	9.6	N/A
Majority		20	3.8	N/A
Turnout			42.7	N/A
Registered electors		1,219		
Conservative hold				

=== Queen Thorne ===
Queen Thorne
Party	Candidate	Votes	%	±%
Independent	I. Martin *	339	63.5	N/A
Conservative	W. Coyler	195	36.5	N/A
Majority		144	27.0	N/A
Turnout			45.1	N/A
Registered electors		1,189		
Independent hold				

=== Sherborne East ===
Sherborne East (2 seats)
Party	Candidate	Votes	%	±%
Conservative	T. Farmer *	445	34.6	–4.7
Independent	M. Hughes	390	–	N/A
Independent	O. Chisholm	376	–	N/A
Conservative	M. Snowden	299	–	
Labour	R. Bygrave *	258	20.1	–13.3
Liberal Democrats	D. Fisher	192	14.9	–12.4
Liberal Democrats	M. Rehahn	134	–	
Turnout			40.4	–5.3
Registered electors		2,785		
Conservative hold		Swing		
Independent gain from Independent		Swing		

=== Sherborne West ===
Sherborne West (3 seats)
Party	Candidate	Votes	%	±%
Conservative	D. Mildenhall *	922	50.7	+10.4
Conservative	P. Shorland *	749	–	
Liberal Democrats	Robin Andrew Shane Legg	648	35.6	+3.2
Conservative	H. Warburton	625	–	
Liberal Democrats	J. Palmer	520	–	
Liberal Democrats	E. Gasson	414	–	
Independent	J. Williams	249	13.7	N/A
Turnout			40.3	–6.3
Registered electors		3,871		
Conservative hold		Swing		
Conservative hold		Swing		
Liberal Democrats hold		Swing		

=== Symondsbury ===
Symondsbury
Party	Candidate	Votes	%	±%
Conservative	G. Summers *	219	51.2	+0.4
Liberal Democrats	F. McKenzie	209	48.8	N/A
Majority		10	2.3	+0.7
Turnout			32.2	–0.3
Registered electors		1,343		
Conservative hold		Swing		

=== Thorncombe ===
Thorncombe
Party	Candidate	Votes	%	±%
Conservative	I. Gillespie	283	56.4	–2.7
Independent	T. Bennett	219	43.6	N/A
Majority		64	12.7	–5.4
Turnout			47.2	–0.8
Registered electors		1,083		
Conservative hold		Swing		

=== Tolpuddle ===
Tolpuddle
Party	Candidate	Votes	%	±%
Conservative	I. Mayo	222	57.1	–6.7
Labour	R. Pickering	88	22.6	–13.6
Liberal Democrats	C. Hebditch	79	20.3	N/A
Majority		134	34.4	+6.9
Turnout			47.9	+1.1
Registered electors		820		
Conservative hold		Swing		

=== Whitchurch Canonicorum ===
Whitchurch Canonicorum
Party	Candidate	Votes	%	±%
Liberal Democrats	H. Thomas	379	51.8	+8.8
Conservative	D. Bushrod *	353	48.2	–8.8
Majority		26	3.6	N/A
Turnout			62.7	+10.7
Registered electors		1,178		
Liberal Democrats gain from Conservative		Swing		

=== Winterborne St Martin ===
Winterborne St Martin
Party	Candidate	Votes	%	±%
Independent	S. Slade *	406	46.5	N/A
Liberal Democrats	D. Rickard	254	29.1	N/A
Conservative	J. Holdaway	213	24.4	N/A
Majority		152	17.4	N/A
Turnout			43.2	N/A
Registered electors		2,031		
Independent hold				

=== Yetminster ===
Yetminster
Party	Candidate	Votes	%	±%
Conservative	G. House	435	70.5	+27.9
Liberal Democrats	K. Goulding	182	29.5	–27.9
Majority		253	41.0	N/A
Turnout			43.0	–6.7
Registered electors		1,434		
Conservative gain from Liberal Democrats		Swing		
