= 2003 West Dorset District Council election =

Election in England

← 1999	1 May 2003	2007 →

All 48 seats to West Dorset District Council 25 seats needed for a majority
	First party	Second party	Third party
	Con	LD	Ind
Party	Conservative	Liberal Democrats	Independent
Last election	22 seats, 35.6%	15 seats, 35.0%	14 seats, 18.7%
Seats won	25	12	11
Seat change	▲3	▼3	▼3
Popular vote	17,967	11,937	7,500
Percentage	45.5%	30.2%	19.0%
Swing	▲9.9%	▼4.8%	▲0.3%
- Map showing the results of the 2003 West Dorset District Council elections.
Council control before election
No overall control
Council control after election
Conservative

The 2003 West Dorset District Council election was held on Thursday 1 May 2003 to elect councillors to West Dorset District Council in England. It took place on the same day as other district council elections in the United Kingdom. The entire council was up for election. Following boundary changes the number of wards were reduced by five, and the number of seats reduced from 55 to 48.

The 2003 election saw the Conservatives take majority control of the District Council.

== Ward results ==
=== Beaminster ===
Beaminster (2 seats)
Party	Candidate	Votes	%	±%
Liberal Democrats	Caroline Lucy Payne	unopposed	N/A	N/A
Conservative	V. Ivory *	unopposed	N/A	N/A
Registered electors		3,213		
Liberal Democrats hold				
Conservative hold				

=== Bradford Abbas ===
Bradford Abbas
Party	Candidate	Votes	%	±%
Independent	E. Garrett *	390	66.1	+7.8
Liberal Democrats	S. Longdon	200	33.9	+14.6
Majority		190	32.2	–3.7
Turnout			38.6	–9.1
Registered electors		1,541		
Independent hold		Swing		

=== Bradpole ===
Bradpole
Party	Candidate	Votes	%	±%
Conservative	Ronald William Coatsworth *	406	78.5	N/A
Liberal Democrats	G. Fifield	111	21.5	N/A
Majority		295	57.1	N/A
Turnout			31.0	N/A
Registered electors		1,673		
Conservative gain from Independent				

=== Bridport North ===
Bridport North (2 seats)
Party	Candidate	Votes	%	±%
Conservative	R. Stoodley	445	31.5	N/A
Liberal Democrats	Christopher Martin Ray	393	27.8	N/A
Conservative	Keith Allan Day	333	–	
Labour	R. Nicholls	325	23.0	N/A
Liberal Democrats	K. Wallace	305	–	
Independent	J. Shaw	250	17.7	N/A
Turnout			33.6	N/A
Registered electors		3,389		
Conservative win (new seat)				
Liberal Democrats win (new seat)				

=== Bridport South & Bothenhampton ===
Bridport South & Bothenhampton (3 seats)
Party	Candidate	Votes	%	±%
Conservative	S. Brown *	842	29.8	N/A
Independent	D. Tett	715	25.3	N/A
Conservative	G. Pritchard *	599	–	
Labour	C. Wild *	556	19.7	N/A
Conservative	H. Samuel	347	–	
Liberal Democrats	A. Harrison	339	12.0	N/A
Liberal Democrats	S. Bagnall	325	–	
Green	L. Sea	272	9.6	N/A
Dorset Stop The War	D. Partridge	102	3.6	N/A
Turnout			37.7	N/A
Registered electors		4,409		
Conservative win (new seat)				
Independent win (new seat)				
Conservative win (new seat)				

=== Broadmayne ===
Broadmayne
Party	Candidate	Votes	%	±%
Independent	A. Thacker *	unopposed	N/A	N/A
Registered electors		1,559		
Independent hold				

=== Broadwindsor ===
Broadwindsor
Party	Candidate	Votes	%	±%
Conservative	L. Sewell *	384	58.4	–5.5
Liberal Democrats	D. Prysor-Jones	273	41.6	+5.5
Majority		111	16.9	–10.9
Turnout			45.6	+1.6
Registered electors		1,447		
Conservative hold		Swing		

=== Burton Bradstock ===
Burton Bradstock
Party	Candidate	Votes	%	±%
Liberal Democrats	M. Parsons	637	67.2	+26.2
Conservative	M. Pritchard *	311	32.8	–26.2
Majority		326	34.4	N/A
Turnout			59.1	+2.9
Registered electors		1,608		
Liberal Democrats gain from Conservative		Swing		

=== Cam Vale ===
Cam Vale
Party	Candidate	Votes	%	±%
Liberal Democrats	S. Friar *	456	59.1	N/A
Conservative	P. Sargent *	315	40.9	N/A
Majority		141	18.3	N/A
Turnout			46.7	N/A
Registered electors		1,652		
Liberal Democrats win (new seat)				

=== Charminster & Cerne Valley ===
Charminster & Cerne Valley (2 seats)
Party	Candidate	Votes	%	±%
Conservative	S. East *	1,012	74.2	N/A
Conservative	A. Horsington	984	–	
Independent	L. Clarke	352	25.8	N/A
Turnout			41.0	N/A
Registered electors		3,334		
Conservative win (new seat)				
Conservative win (new seat)				

=== Charmouth ===
Charmouth
Party	Candidate	Votes	%	±%
Independent	D. Newson *	unopposed	N/A	N/A
Registered electors		1,475		
Independent hold				

=== Chesil Bank ===
Chesil Bank
Party	Candidate	Votes	%	±%
Conservative	T. Bartlett	494	61.1	N/A
Liberal Democrats	I. Lewis	315	38.9	N/A
Majority		179	22.1	N/A
Turnout			45.6	+0.8
Registered electors		1,788		
Conservative gain from Independent		Swing		

=== Chickerell ===
Chickerell (3 seats)
Party	Candidate	Votes	%	±%
Liberal Democrats	I. Gardner *	578	42.2	N/A
Liberal Democrats	M. Rogers	557	–	
Conservative	M. Jolliffe	533	38.9	N/A
Liberal Democrats	R. Denton-White	461	–	
Conservative	M. Dunseith	452	–	
Conservative	J. Wilson	392	–	
Independent	D. Smithson	259	18.9	N/A
Turnout			28.6	N/A
Registered electors		4,332		
Liberal Democrats win (new seat)				
Liberal Democrats win (new seat)				
Conservative win (new seat)				

=== Chideock & Symondsbury ===
Chideock & Symondsbury
Party	Candidate	Votes	%	±%
Conservative	G. Summers *	386	67.5	N/A
Liberal Democrats	P. Morgan-Smith	186	32.5	N/A
Majority		200	35.0	N/A
Turnout			39.0	N/A
Registered electors		1,468		
Conservative win (new seat)				

=== Dorchester East ===
Dorchester East (2 seats)
Party	Candidate	Votes	%	±%
Liberal Democrats	Enid Stella Jones *	734	59.1	+6.8
Liberal Democrats	T. Harries *	620	–	
Conservative	R. Thorogood	508	40.9	+15.7
Conservative	B. Parkhurst	503	–	
Turnout			36.0	+4.1
Registered electors		3,548		
Liberal Democrats hold		Swing		
Liberal Democrats hold		Swing		

=== Dorchester North ===
Dorchester North (2 seats)
Party	Candidate	Votes	%	±%
Liberal Democrats	Andrew James Canning	550	38.8	+4.7
Independent	A. Beard	481	33.9	N/A
Liberal Democrats	R. Tarr	459	–	
Conservative	A. Parry	386	27.2	+7.7
Conservative	J. Bell	362	–	
Turnout			42.0	+2.2
Registered electors		2,938		
Liberal Democrats hold		Swing		
Independent gain from Independent		Swing		

=== Dorchester South ===
Dorchester South (2 seats)
Party	Candidate	Votes	%	±%
Liberal Democrats	M. Rennie *	760	57.1	N/A
Liberal Democrats	R. Potter	639	–	
Conservative	R. Martindale	572	42.9	N/A
Conservative	J. Halewood	567	–	
Turnout			40.0	N/A
Registered electors		3,312		
Liberal Democrats win (new seat)				
Liberal Democrats win (new seat)				

=== Dorchester West ===
Dorchester West (2 seats)
Party	Candidate	Votes	%	±%
Independent	D. Barrett *	757	40.5	N/A
Liberal Democrats	David Trevor Jones *	705	37.7	N/A
Liberal Democrats	T. Parsley	616	–	
Conservative	I. Birt	406	21.7	N/A
Turnout			42.0	N/A
Registered electors		3,381		
Independent win (new seat)				
Liberal Democrats win (new seat)				

=== Frome Valley ===
Frome Valley
Party	Candidate	Votes	%	±%
Independent	M. Penfold *	unopposed	N/A	N/A
Registered electors		1,656		
Independent hold				

=== Halstock ===
Halstock
Party	Candidate	Votes	%	±%
Independent	T. Frost *	462	63.3	–1.5
Liberal Democrats	B. Dearlove	268	36.7	+1.5
Majority		194	26.6	–2.9
Turnout			49.0	+3.1
Registered electors		1,504		
Independent hold		Swing		

=== Loders ===
Loders
Party	Candidate	Votes	%	±%
Conservative	M. Roberts	298	50.1	N/A
Independent	A. Brown	172	28.9	N/A
Liberal Democrats	V. Barnes	125	21.0	N/A
Majority		126	21.2	N/A
Turnout			41.5	N/A
Registered electors		1,437		
Conservative hold				

=== Lyme Regis ===
Lyme Regis (2 seats)
Party	Candidate	Votes	%	±%
Independent	O. Lovell *	510	–	N/A
Conservative	K. Meech *	452	47.0	N/A
Independent	P. Hicks	438	–	N/A
Independent	S. Williams	397	–	N/A
Turnout			33.3	N/A
Registered electors		3,131		
Independent win (new seat)				
Conservative win (new seat)				

=== Maiden Newton ===
Maiden Newton
Party	Candidate	Votes	%	±%
Independent	N. Patmore	357	51.6	N/A
Conservative	P. Gregson	335	48.4	+20.8
Majority		22	3.2	N/A
Turnout			44.9	–0.6
Registered electors		1,549		
Independent gain from Independent		Swing		

=== Marshwood Vale ===
Marshwood Vale
Party	Candidate	Votes	%	±%
Conservative	I. Gillespie *	407	50.8	N/A
Liberal Democrats	H. Thomas *	394	49.2	N/A
Majority		13	1.6	N/A
Turnout			55.8	N/A
Registered electors		1,440		
Conservative win (new seat)				

=== Netherbury ===
Netherbury
Party	Candidate	Votes	%	±%
Conservative	A. Alford	399	62.1	+10.1
Liberal Democrats	R. Pawley	244	37.9	–10.1
Majority		155	24.1	+20.0
Turnout			43.0	–
Registered electors		1,512		
Conservative hold		Swing		

=== Owermoigne ===
Owermoigne (2 seats)
Party	Candidate	Votes	%	±%
Conservative	T. Seall *	662	52.5	+6.2
Conservative	D. Smy *	626	–	
Independent	R. Russell	600	47.5	N/A
Turnout			42.5	+2.6
Registered electors		2,774		
Conservative hold		Swing		
Conservative hold		Swing		

=== Piddle Valley ===
Piddle Valley
Party	Candidate	Votes	%	±%
Conservative	S. Barker	unopposed	N/A	N/A
Registered electors		1,618		
Conservative hold				

=== Puddletown ===
Puddletown
Party	Candidate	Votes	%	±%
Independent	T. Pearce	290	36.4	+0.7
Conservative	G. Harries *	277	34.8	–4.7
Independent	I. Mayo *	229	28.8	N/A
Majority		13	1.6	N/A
Turnout			45.7	+3.0
Registered electors		1,762		
Independent gain from Conservative		Swing		

=== Queen Thorne ===
Queen Thorne
Party	Candidate	Votes	%	±%
Conservative	Robert Andrew Gould	unopposed	N/A	N/A
Registered electors		1,602		
Conservative gain from Independent				

=== Sherborne East ===
Sherborne East (2 seats)
Party	Candidate	Votes	%	±%
Conservative	Terence Peter Farmer *	628	43.7	+9.1
Conservative	M. Clark	567	–	
Green	Jenny Susan Greene	467	32.5	N/A
Labour	Robert James Bygrave	343	23.9	+3.8
Turnout			34.0	–6.4
Registered electors		3,308		
Conservative hold		Swing		
Conservative gain from Independent		Swing		

=== Sherborne West ===
Sherborne West (2 seats)
Party	Candidate	Votes	%	±%
Conservative	Peter Robert Shorland *	731	56.4	N/A
Conservative	Marjorie Snowden	660	–	
Liberal Democrats	Robin Andrew Shane Legg *	564	43.6	N/A
Turnout			33.6	N/A
Registered electors		3,509		
Conservative win (new seat)				
Conservative win (new seat)				

=== Winterborne St Martin ===
Winterborne St Martin
Party	Candidate	Votes	%	±%
Independent	Stephen John Slade *	448	46.5	+18.7
Liberal Democrats	D. Rickard	239	34.8	+5.7
Majority		209	30.4	+13.0
Turnout			41.6	–1.6
Registered electors		1,663		
Independent hold		Swing		

=== Yetminster ===
Yetminster
Party	Candidate	Votes	%	±%
Conservative	G. House *	386	69.8	–0.7
Liberal Democrats	S. Hewson	167	30.2	+0.7
Majority		219	39.6	–1.4
Turnout			41.3	–1.7
Registered electors		1,343		
Conservative hold		Swing		
