= 1987 West Dorset District Council election =

1987 UK local government election

← 1986	7 May 1987	1991 →

All 55 seats to West Dorset District Council 28 seats needed for a majority
	First party	Second party	Third party
	Ind	Con	All
Party	Independent	Conservative	Alliance
Seats before	29	12	9
Seats won	23	14	13
Seat change	▼6	▲2	▲4
Popular vote	11,822	12,155	14,254
Percentage	26.1%	26.8%	31.4%
	Fourth party	Fifth party
	Lab	IndC
Party	Labour	Ind. Conservative
Seats before	2	3
Seats won	3	2
Seat change	▲1	▼1
Popular vote	5,649	929
Percentage	12.5%	2.0%
Council control before election
Independent
Council control after election
No overall control

The 1987 West Dorset District Council election was held on Thursday 7 May 1987 to elect councillors to West Dorset District Council in England. It took place on the same day as other district council elections in the United Kingdom. The entire council was up for election as West Dorset returned to whole councils elections, after previously having been elected in thirds.

The 1987 election saw the Independent councillors lose their majority they had held since the formation of the Council in 1974.

== Ward results ==
=== Beaminster ===
Beaminster (2 seats)
Party	Candidate	Votes	%	±%
Independent	A. Hudson *	959	–	N/A
Alliance	N. Brough	668	41.1	+4.7
Independent	R. Blake	601	–	N/A
Turnout			58.2	–11.6
Registered electors		2,794		
Independent hold		Swing		
Alliance gain from Independent		Swing		

=== Bothenhampton ===
Bothenhampton
Party	Candidate	Votes	%	±%
Conservative	D. Cracknell *	610	68.8	N/A
Alliance	I. Kent	276	31.2	–12.7
Majority		334	37.6	N/A
Turnout			56.2	+4.0
Registered electors		1,577		
Conservative gain from Ind. Conservative		Swing		

=== Bradford Abbas ===
Bradford Abbas
Party	Candidate	Votes	%	±%
Independent	E. Garrett *	unopposed	N/A	N/A
Registered electors		1,412		
Independent hold				

=== Bradpole ===
Bradpole
Party	Candidate	Votes	%	±%
Ind. Conservative	R. Coatsworth *	449	75.6	N/A
Labour	K. Dixon	145	24.4	N/A
Majority		304	51.2	N/A
Turnout			37.3	N/A
Registered electors		1,591		
Ind. Conservative hold		Swing		

=== Bridport North ===
Bridport North (3 seats)
Party	Candidate	Votes	%	±%
Labour	D. Cash	811	39.9	+0.7
Alliance	A. Tiltman *	644	31.7	+7.0
Labour	L. Dibdin	611	–	
Conservative	D. Stebbings	576	28.4	–7.7
Conservative	S. Baker *	551	–	
Labour	R. Wilkinson *	527	–	
Conservative	G. Strawson	465	–	
Alliance	R. Draper	307	–	
Alliance	P. Lathey	259	–	
Turnout			61.3	+18.2
Registered electors		3,312		
Labour hold		Swing		
Alliance hold		Swing		
Labour gain from Conservative		Swing		

=== Bridport South ===
Bridport South (2 seats)
Party	Candidate	Votes	%	±%
Alliance	A. Bell *	624	39.1	N/A
Independent	C. Samways *	530	33.2	–27.2
Conservative	D. Bushrod	441	27.6	–12.0
Alliance	B. Wheeler	403	–	
Turnout			62.1	+25.1
Registered electors		2,567		
Alliance hold		Swing		
Independent hold		Swing		

=== Broadmayne ===
Broadmayne
Party	Candidate	Votes	%	±%
Independent	J. Gregory	332	53.1	N/A
Conservative	A. Abbott	163	26.1	–20.1
Independent	A. Thacker	130	20.8	N/A
Majority		167	27.0	N/A
Turnout			50.0	—2.7
Registered electors		1,249		
Independent gain from Alliance		Swing		

=== Broadwindsor ===
Broadwindsor
Party	Candidate	Votes	%	±%
Alliance	J. Hardman	258	50.8	N/A
Independent	C. Coate *	250	49.2	N/A
Majority		8	1.6	N/A
Turnout			46.6	N/A
Registered electors		1,091		
Alliance gain from Independent				

=== Burton Bradstock ===
Burton Bradstock
Party	Candidate	Votes	%	±%
Independent	R. Bailey *	unopposed	N/A	N/A
Registered electors		1,128		
Independent hold				

=== Caundle Vale ===
Caundle Vale
Party	Candidate	Votes	%	±%
Independent	N. White *	unopposed	N/A	N/A
Registered electors		1,099		
Independent hold				

=== Cerne Valley ===
Cerne Valley
Party	Candidate	Votes	%	±%
Independent	R. Stenhouse *	unopposed	N/A	N/A
Registered electors		1,094		
Independent hold				

=== Charminster ===
Charminster
Party	Candidate	Votes	%	±%
Conservative	B. Woodhouse *	383	56.7	–6.3
Alliance	G. Halliwell	160	23.7	–7.1
Independent	E. Hanford	133	19.7	N/A
Majority		223	33.0	+0.8
Turnout			52.6	+7.4
Registered electors		1,391		
Conservative hold		Swing		

=== Charmouth ===
Charmouth
Party	Candidate	Votes	%	±%
Independent	J. Cockerill *	512	73.6	N/A
Alliance	N. Powell	184	26.4	N/A
Majority		328	47.2	N/A
Turnout			50.0	N/A
Registered electors		1,391		
Independent hold				

=== Chesil Bank ===
Chesil Bank
Party	Candidate	Votes	%	±%
Independent	M. Pengelly *	638	85.4	N/A
Green	J. Laver	109	14.6	N/A
Majority		529	70.8	N/A
Turnout			58.9	N/A
Registered electors		1,269		
Independent hold				

=== Chickerell ===
Chickerell (2 seats)
Party	Candidate	Votes	%	±%
Conservative	P. Brown	unopposed	N/A	N/A
Conservative	E. Davies *	unopposed	N/A	N/A
Registered electors		3,049		
Conservative hold				
Conservative gain from Alliance				

=== Dorchester East ===
Dorchester East (2 seats)
Party	Candidate	Votes	%	±%
Alliance	Enid Stella Jones *	889	55.4	+5.2
Alliance	D. Smith *	544	–	
Conservative	C. Grassby	445	27.7	–7.4
Green	B. Smith	160	10.0	N/A
Labour	N. Osborne	112	7.0	–7.7
Turnout			70.8	+29.9
Registered electors		2,269		
Alliance hold		Swing		
Alliance hold		Swing		

=== Dorchester North ===
Dorchester North (2 seats)
Party	Candidate	Votes	%	±%
Independent	L. Phillips *	743	37.4	N/A
Conservative	L. Lock *	630	31.7	–15.2
Alliance	M. McLellan	412	20.8	–13.0
Labour	J. Hertslet	200	10.1	–9.2
Turnout			87.9	+46.3
Registered electors		2,258		
Independent hold		Swing		
Conservative hold		Swing		

=== Dorchester South ===
Dorchester South (3 seats)
Party	Candidate	Votes	%	±%
Alliance	H. Dowell	1,025	41.9	–6.7
Conservative	P. Seaton *	977	39.9	–1.8
Alliance	D. Maggs *	973	–	
Alliance	M. Rennie	905	–	
Conservative	M. Dowell	840	–	
Conservative	R. Burrage	820	–	
Green	J. McMillan	272	11.1	N/A
Labour	F. Pope	170	7.0	–2.6
Labour	S. Coombes	142	–	
Turnout			63.4	+15.5
Registered electors		3,861		
Alliance hold		Swing		
Conservative hold		Swing		
Alliance gain from Conservative		Swing		

=== Dorchester West ===
Dorchester West (3 seats)
Party	Candidate	Votes	%	±%
Labour	J. Antell *	762	36.5	+7.6
Alliance	David Trevor Jones *	714	34.2	+6.3
Alliance	D. Bowring	647	–	
Alliance	E. Boothman	640	–	
Conservative	G. Powell *	610	29.2	–1.4
Conservative	D. Barry	408	–	
Labour	J. Watson	407	–	
Conservative	L. Wild	387	–	
Labour	T. Warren	311	–	
Turnout			62.6	+0.1
Registered electors		3,330		
Labour hold		Swing		
Alliance hold		Swing		
Alliance gain from Conservative		Swing		

=== Frome Valley ===
Frome Valley
Party	Candidate	Votes	%	±%
Independent	M. Penfold	465	75.9	N/A
Independent	C. Pook	148	24.1	N/A
Majority		317	51.8	N/A
Turnout			55.5	+2.3
Registered electors		1,104		
Independent gain from Independent		Swing		

=== Halstock ===
Halstock
Party	Candidate	Votes	%	±%
Independent	T. Frost *	unopposed	N/A	N/A
Registered electors		1,190		
Independent hold				

=== Holnest ===
Holnest
Party	Candidate	Votes	%	±%
Independent	G. House	407	63.4	N/A
Alliance	G. Morris	235	36.6	N/A
Majority		172	26.8	N/A
Turnout			53.6	+17.7
Registered electors		1,198		
Independent gain from Independent		Swing		

=== Loders ===
Loders
Party	Candidate	Votes	%	±%
Independent	P. Bates	400	67.8	N/A
Conservative	D. Fry *	190	32.2	N/A
Majority		210	35.6	N/A
Turnout			55.0	N/A
Registered electors		1,072		
Independent gain from Independent		Swing		

=== Lyme Regis ===
Lyme Regis (3 seats)
Party	Candidate	Votes	%	±%
Independent	D. Applebee *	846	–	N/A
Conservative	J. Nuttall *	818	49.2	N/A
Independent	O. Lovell	555	–	N/A
Independent	M. White	520	–	N/A
Independent	S. Poupard	334	–	N/A
Turnout			54.1	N/A
Registered electors		3,075		
Independent hold				
Conservative hold				
Independent gain from Independent				

=== Maiden Newton ===
Maiden Newton
Party	Candidate	Votes	%	±%
Independent	H. Haward *	unopposed	N/A	N/A
Registered electors		1,158		
Independent hold				

=== Netherbury ===
Netherbury
Party	Candidate	Votes	%	±%
Conservative	J. Peake *	490	78.0	+3.1
Labour	T. Weld	138	22.0	–3.1
Majority		352	56.0	+6.2
Turnout			47.0	+1.9
Registered electors		1,335		
Conservative hold		Swing		

=== Owermoigne ===
Owermoigne (2 seats)
Party	Candidate	Votes	%	±%
Alliance	J. Shuttleworth	666	56.1	N/A
Alliance	G. Cant	557	–	
Independent	R. Symes *	522	43.9	N/A
Turnout			53.2	N/A
Registered electors		2,235		
Alliance hold				
Alliance gain from Independent				

=== Piddle Valley ===
Piddle Valley
Party	Candidate	Votes	%	±%
Ind. Conservative	A. Read *	480	79.5	N/A
Labour	B. Bowen	124	20.5	N/A
Majority		356	59.0	N/A
Turnout			46.2	N/A
Registered electors		1,306		
Ind. Conservative hold				

=== Puddletown ===
Puddletown
Party	Candidate	Votes	%	±%
Conservative	G. Harries	305	46.6	N/A
Independent	A. Banfield	265	40.3	N/A
Labour	J. Pearson	87	13.2	–14.4
Majority		40	6.3	N/A
Turnout			59.1	+4.4
Registered electors		1,111		
Conservative gain from Independent		Swing		

=== Queen Thorne ===
Queen Thorne
Party	Candidate	Votes	%	±%
Independent	J. Brewer *	unopposed	N/A	N/A
Registered electors		1,185		
Independent hold				

=== Sherborne East ===
Sherborne East (2 seats)
Party	Candidate	Votes	%	±%
Independent	E. Dyke *	674	35.4	–9.2
Conservative	J. Williams	540	28.2	N/A
Alliance	S. King	476	24.9	–10.1
Alliance	J. Hill	409	–	
Labour	A. Birks-Hay	224	11.7	–8.6
Turnout			72.7	+24.6
Registered electors		2,634		
Independent hold		Swing		
Conservative gain from Independent		Swing		

=== Sherborne West ===
Sherborne West (3 seats)
Party	Candidate	Votes	%	±%
Independent	E. King *	951	–	N/A
Conservative	S. Waddington *	929	29.0	–14.7
Alliance	D. Baggs	793	24.8	–7.5
Independent	K. Luxmoore	702	–	N/A
Labour	A. Mitchell	527	16.5	–7.4
Labour	G. Danes	352	–	
Turnout			89.7	+43.0
Registered electors		3,566		
Independent hold		Swing		
Conservative hold		Swing		
Alliance gain from Conservative		Swing		

=== Symondsbury ===
Symondsbury
Party	Candidate	Votes	%	±%
Conservative	G. Summers *	unopposed	N/A	N/A
Registered electors		1,401		
Conservative hold				

=== Thorncombe ===
Thorncombe
Party	Candidate	Votes	%	±%
Conservative	J. Terrett	316	48.6	N/A
Independent	P. Atyeo *	152	23.4	N/A
Alliance	A. Greenless	129	19.8	N/A
Independent	T. Richards	53	8.2	N/A
Majority		164	25.2	N/A
Turnout			61.1	N/A
Registered electors		1,063		
Conservative gain from Independent				

=== Tolpuddle ===
Tolpuddle
Party	Candidate	Votes	%	±%
Independent	M. Kraft *	unopposed	N/A	N/A
Registered electors		802		
Independent hold				

=== Whitchurch Canonicorum ===
Whitchurch Canonicorum
Party	Candidate	Votes	%	±%
Conservative	C. Gibson *	451	62.8	N/A
Alliance	H. Fielder	267	37.2	N/A
Majority		184	25.6	N/A
Turnout			59.7	N/A
Registered electors		1,202		
Conservative hold				

=== Winterborne St Martin ===
Winterborne St Martin
Party	Candidate	Votes	%	±%
Independent	S. Slade *	unopposed	N/A	N/A
Registered electors		1,771		
Independent hold				

=== Yetminster ===
Yetminster
Party	Candidate	Votes	%	±%
Independent	J. Meaden *	unopposed	N/A	N/A
Registered electors		1,252		
Independent hold				
