= 1995 West Dorset District Council election =

1995 UK local government election

← 1991	4 May 1995	1999 →

All 55 seats to West Dorset District Council 28 seats needed for a majority
	First party	Second party	Third party
	Con	Ind	LD
Party	Conservative	Independent	Liberal Democrats
Last election	18 seats, 33.2%	19 seats, 13.2%	11 seats, 29.0%
Seats won	18	18	13
Seat change	Steady	▼1	▲2
Popular vote	8,895	7,280	12,408
Percentage	24.8%	12.9%	34.6%
Swing	▼8.4%	▲6.9%	▲5.6%
	Fourth party	Fifth party
	Lab	SDP
Party	Labour	SDP
Last election	5 seats, 18.1%	1 seat, 1.6%
Seats won	5	1
Seat change	Steady	Steady
Popular vote	7,037	N/A
Percentage	19.6%	N/A
Swing	▲1.5%	▼1.6%
Council control before election
No overall control
Council control after election
No overall control

The 1995 West Dorset District Council election was held on Thursday 4 May 1995 to elect councillors to West Dorset District Council in England. It took place on the same day as other district council elections in the United Kingdom. The entire council was up for election.

The 1995 election saw the council remain in no overall control, with Independent councillors and the Conservatives each electing 18 councillors.

== Ward results ==
=== Beaminster ===
Beaminster (2 seats)
Party	Candidate	Votes	%	±%
Independent	D. Barrett	963	–	N/A
Liberal Democrats	F. Streets	785	33.6	–8.0
Conservative	V. Ivory	587	25.1	–0.3
Liberal Democrats	M. Walcot	514	–	
Independent	M. Puzey	514	–	N/A
Turnout			57.0	+0.7
Registered electors		3,130		
Independent hold		Swing		
Liberal Democrats hold		Swing		

=== Bothenhampton ===
Bothenhampton
Party	Candidate	Votes	%	±%
Conservative	G. Pritchard	496	60.3	–13.5
Labour	M. Farmer	327	39.7	+13.5
Majority		169	20.5	–27.1
Turnout			51.6	–4.7
Registered electors		1,595		
Conservative hold		Swing		

=== Bradford Abbas ===
Bradford Abbas
Party	Candidate	Votes	%	±%
Independent	E. Garrett *	unopposed	N/A	N/A
Registered electors		1,491		
Independent hold				

=== Bradpole ===
Bradpole
Party	Candidate	Votes	%	±%
Independent	R. Coatsworth *	450	68.9	N/A
Labour	M. Shiels	203	31.1	+0.9
Majority		247	37.8	N/A
Turnout			37.0	–3.5
Registered electors		1,767		
Independent gain from Ind. Conservative		Swing		

=== Bridport North ===
Bridport North (3 seats)
Party	Candidate	Votes	%	±%
Labour	L. Dibdin *	922	40.6	–0.1
Liberal Democrats	R. Draper	721	31.7	–2.2
Conservative	B. Rowe	628	27.7	+2.3
Liberal Democrats	F. McKenzie	570	–	
Turnout			42.7	–11.5
Registered electors		3,475		
Labour hold		Swing		
Liberal Democrats hold		Swing		
Conservative gain from Labour		Swing		

=== Bridport South ===
Bridport South (2 seats)
Party	Candidate	Votes	%	±%
Labour	C. Murless *	660	37.2	+5.7
Independent	C. Samways *	477	26.9	–1.0
Conservative	S. Brown	397	22.4	+0.1
Liberal Democrats	B. Wheeler	242	13.6	–4.7
Turnout			53.5	+1.8
Registered electors		2,629		
Labour hold		Swing		
Independent hold		Swing		

=== Broadmayne ===
Broadmayne
Party	Candidate	Votes	%	±%
Independent	A. Thacker *	unopposed	N/A	N/A
Registered electors		1,483		
Independent hold				

=== Broadwindsor ===
Broadwindsor
Party	Candidate	Votes	%	±%
Liberal Democrats	J. Hardman *	unopposed	N/A	N/A
Registered electors		1,166		
Liberal Democrats hold				

=== Burton Bradstock ===
Burton Bradstock
Party	Candidate	Votes	%	±%
Conservative	M. Pritchard *	unopposed	N/A	N/A
Registered electors		1,311		
Conservative hold				

=== Caundle Vale ===
Caundle Vale
Party	Candidate	Votes	%	±%
Independent	N. White *	260	62.1	–9.7
Liberal Democrats	E. Compton	236	47.6	N/A
Majority		24	4.8	–19.3
Turnout			48.9	–6.4
Registered electors		1,092		
Independent hold				

=== Cerne Valley ===
Cerne Valley
Party	Candidate	Votes	%	±%
Independent	R. Stenhouse *	unopposed	N/A	N/A
Registered electors		1,186		
Independent hold				

=== Charminster ===
Charminster
Party	Candidate	Votes	%	±%
Conservative	J. Kennedy *	unopposed	N/A	N/A
Registered electors		1,249		
Conservative hold				

=== Charmouth ===
Charmouth
Party	Candidate	Votes	%	±%
Independent	J. Cockerill *	unopposed	N/A	N/A
Registered electors		1,348		
Independent hold				

=== Chesil Bank ===
Chesil Bank
Party	Candidate	Votes	%	±%
Independent	M. Pengelly *	unopposed	N/A	N/A
Registered electors		1,383		
Independent hold				

=== Chickerell ===
Chickerell (2 seats)
Party	Candidate	Votes	%	±%
Conservative	P. Brown *	unopposed	N/A	N/A
Independent	I. Gardner *	unopposed	N/A	N/A
Registered electors		3,906		
Conservative hold				
Independent gain from Conservative				

=== Dorchester East ===
Dorchester East (2 seats)
Party	Candidate	Votes	%	±%
Liberal Democrats	Enid Stella Jones *	769	75.5	+11.9
Liberal Democrats	T. Harries *	626	–	
Conservative	G. Duke	249	24.5	+1.6
Turnout			35.7	–14.0
Registered electors		2,936		
Liberal Democrats hold		Swing		
Liberal Democrats hold		Swing		

=== Dorchester North ===
Dorchester North (2 seats)
Party	Candidate	Votes	%	±%
Independent	L. Phillips *	446	–	
Liberal Democrats	R. Biggs	372	28.2	N/A
Independent	L. Lock *	323	–	N/A
Labour	J. Dyer	278	21.1	N/A
Labour	S. Pering	258	–	
Green	B. Smith	223	16.9	–9.7
Turnout			47.0	–3.1
Registered electors		2,214		
Independent hold		Swing		
Liberal Democrats gain from Conservative		Swing		

=== Dorchester South ===
Dorchester South (3 seats)
Party	Candidate	Votes	%	±%
Liberal Democrats	H. Dowell *	1,054	42.5	+0.6
Liberal Democrats	M. Rennie *	1,008	–	
Liberal Democrats	D. Maggs *	893	–	
Independent	K. Lambert	867	34.9	N/A
Conservative	R. Hill	560	22.6	–11.1
Turnout			45.0	–8.8
Registered electors		4,029		
Liberal Democrats hold		Swing		
Liberal Democrats hold		Swing		
Liberal Democrats hold		Swing		

=== Dorchester West ===
Dorchester West (3 seats)
Party	Candidate	Votes	%	±%
Labour	J. Antell *	1,059	51.3	+3.2
Labour	W. Gundry *	789	–	
Liberal Democrats	David Trevor Jones *	653	31.6	–0.4
Labour	P. Hayward	631	–	
Liberal Democrats	P. Sennett	430	–	
Conservative	D. Fry	354	17.1	–2.8
Turnout			46.3	–
Registered electors		3,227		
Labour hold		Swing		
Labour hold		Swing		
Liberal Democrats hold		Swing		

=== Frome Valley ===
Frome Valley
Party	Candidate	Votes	%	±%
Independent	M. Penfold *	unopposed	N/A	N/A
Registered electors		1,229		
Independent hold				

=== Halstock ===
Halstock
Party	Candidate	Votes	%	±%
Independent	T. Frost *	unopposed	N/A	N/A
Registered electors		1,401		
Independent hold				

=== Holnest ===
Holnest
Party	Candidate	Votes	%	±%
Liberal Democrats	S. Friar	521	69.2	N/A
Conservative	G. House *	232	30.8	N/A
Majority		289	38.4	N/A
Turnout			58.0	N/A
Registered electors		1,303		
Liberal Democrats gain from Independent				

=== Loders ===
Loders
Party	Candidate	Votes	%	±%
Conservative	E. Bryan	unopposed	N/A	N/A
Registered electors		1,154		
Conservative hold				

=== Lyme Regis ===
Lyme Regis (3 seats)
Party	Candidate	Votes	%	±%
Independent	O. Lovell *	792	–	N/A
Independent	E. Street	707	–	N/A
Conservative	S. Poupard *	543	37.5	N/A
Independent	V. White	443	–	N/A
Independent	K. Whetlor	310	–	N/A
Liberal Democrats	A. Saull-Hunt	112	7.7	N/A
Turnout			39.0	N/A
Registered electors		3,067		
Independent hold				
Independent gain from Independent				
Conservative hold				

=== Maiden Newton ===
Maiden Newton
Party	Candidate	Votes	%	±%
Independent	E. Harris	450	72.8	N/A
Conservative	R. Bowditch	168	27.2	N/A
Majority		282	45.6	N/A
Turnout			51.0	N/A
Registered electors		1,228		
Independent gain from Independent				

=== Netherbury ===
Netherbury
Party	Candidate	Votes	%	±%
Conservative	G. Haynes *	286	50.7	–17.1
Independent	R. Pawley	278	49.3	N/A
Majority		8	1.4	–34.3
Turnout			42.0	–6.7
Registered electors		1,329		
Conservative hold		Swing		

=== Owermoigne ===
Owermoigne (2 seats)
Party	Candidate	Votes	%	±%
SDP	J. Shuttleworth *	unopposed	N/A	N/A
Conservative	P. Grove-White	unopposed	N/A	N/A
Registered electors		2,523		
SDP hold				
Conservative gain from Liberal Democrats				

=== Piddle Valley ===
Piddle Valley
Party	Candidate	Votes	%	±%
Conservative	J. Boughey	unopposed	N/A	N/A
Registered electors		1,422		
Conservative gain from Independent				

=== Puddletown ===
Puddletown
Party	Candidate	Votes	%	±%
Conservative	G. Harries *	unopposed	N/A	N/A
Registered electors		1,219		
Conservative hold				

=== Queen Thorne ===
Queen Thorne
Party	Candidate	Votes	%	±%
Independent	I. Martin	unopposed	N/A	N/A
Registered electors		1,179		
Independent gain from Independent				

=== Sherborne East ===
Sherborne East (2 seats)
Party	Candidate	Votes	%	±%
Conservative	T. Farmer	496	39.3	–15.0
Labour	R. Bygrave *	422	33.4	N/A
Conservative	J. Williams	372	–	
Liberal Democrats	M. Rehahn	344	27.3	N/A
Labour	L. Ashby	339	–	
Turnout			45.7	–12.8
Registered electors		2,590		
Conservative hold		Swing		
Labour gain from Independent		Swing		

=== Sherborne West ===
Sherborne West (3 seats)
Party	Candidate	Votes	%	±%
Conservative	D. Mildenhall *	863	40.3	+3.0
Conservative	P. Shorland *	788	–	
Liberal Democrats	M. Doyle	693	32.4	–4.1
Conservative	H. Warburton	657	–	
Labour	P. O'Dwyer	586	27.4	N/A
Liberal Democrats	R. Bonelle	559	–	
Liberal Democrats	T. Rogers	497	–	
Turnout			46.6	–13.9
Registered electors		3,911		
Conservative hold		Swing		
Conservative hold		Swing		
Liberal Democrats hold		Swing		

=== Symondsbury ===
Symondsbury
Party	Candidate	Votes	%	±%
Conservative	G. Summers *	228	50.8	–4.6
Labour	B. Begley	221	49.2	+4.6
Majority		7	1.6	–9.3
Turnout			32.5	–9.0
Registered electors		1,383		
Conservative hold		Swing		

=== Thorncombe ===
Thorncombe
Party	Candidate	Votes	%	±%
Conservative	J. Terrett *	290	59.1	N/A
Labour	J. Everington	201	40.9	N/A
Majority		89	18.1	N/A
Turnout			48.0	N/A
Registered electors		1,025		
Conservative hold				

=== Tolpuddle ===
Tolpuddle
Party	Candidate	Votes	%	±%
Conservative	T. Hutchinson *	248	63.8	–4.7
Labour	R. Pickering	141	36.2	+4.7
Majority		107	27.5	–9.5
Turnout			49.0	–5.2
Registered electors		796		
Conservative hold		Swing		

=== Whitchurch Canonicorum ===
Whitchurch Canonicorum
Party	Candidate	Votes	%	±%
Conservative	D. Bushrod *	331	57.0	+18.4
Liberal Democrats	A. Hemingway	250	43.0	N/A
Majority		81	13.9	+7.6
Turnout			52.0	–8.0
Registered electors		1,171		
Conservative hold		Swing		

=== Winterborne St Martin ===
Winterborne St Martin
Party	Candidate	Votes	%	±%
Independent	S. Slade *	unopposed	N/A	N/A
Registered electors		1,989		
Independent hold				

=== Yetminster ===
Yetminster
Party	Candidate	Votes	%	±%
Liberal Democrats	S. King	391	57.4	N/A
Conservative	R. Wilson	290	42.6	N/A
Majority		101	14.8	N/A
Turnout			49.7	N/A
Registered electors		1,370		
Liberal Democrats gain from Conservative				

== By-elections between 1995 and 1999 ==
=== Thorncombe ===
Thorncombe By-Election 17 April 1997
Party	Candidate	Votes	%	±%
Conservative		225	44.6	–14.5
Liberal Democrats		199	39.5	N/A
Labour		80	15.8	–25.1
Majority		26	5.2	–12.9
Turnout			46.84	–1.16
Registered electors				
Conservative hold		Swing		

=== Bridport South ===
Bridport South By-Election (2 seats) 1 May 1997
Party	Candidate	Votes	%	±%
Labour		354	35.1	–2.1
Conservative		328	32.5	+10.1
Liberal Democrats		326	32.2	+18.7
Liberal Democrats		293	–	
Conservative		270	–	
Turnout				
Registered electors				
Labour hold		Swing		
Conservative gain from Independent		Swing		

=== Yetminster ===
Yetminster By-Election 1 May 1997
Party	Candidate	Votes	%	±%
Conservative		576	51.3	+8.7
Liberal Democrats		546	48.7	–8.7
Majority		30	2.7	N/A
Turnout				
Registered electors				
Conservative gain from Liberal Democrats		Swing		

=== Chickerell ===
Chickerell By-Election 10 July 1997
Party	Candidate	Votes	%	±%
Liberal Democrats		701	64.3	N/A
Conservative		201	18.4	N/A
Independent		187	16.9	N/A
Majority		500	45.9	N/A
Turnout			27.7	N/A
Registered electors				
Liberal Democrats gain from Conservative		Swing		
