= 1991 West Dorset District Council election =

1991 UK local government election

← 1987	2 May 1991	1995 →

All 55 seats to West Dorset District Council 28 seats needed for a majority
	First party	Second party	Third party
	Ind	Con	LD
Party	Independent	Conservative	Liberal Democrats
Last election	23 seats, 26.1%	14 seats, 26.8%	13 seats, 31.4%
Seats won	19	18	11
Seat change	▼4	▲4	▼2
Popular vote	5,168	13,305	11,614
Percentage	12.9%	33.2%	29.0%
Swing	▼13.2%	▲6.4%	▼2.4%
	Fourth party	Fifth party	Sixth party
	Lab	SDP	IndC
Party	Labour	SDP	Ind. Conservative
Last election	3 seats, 12.5%	Did not stand	2 seats, 2.0%
Seats won	5	1	1
Seat change	▲2	▲1	▼1
Popular vote	7,241	638	478
Percentage	18.1%	1.6%	1.2%
Swing	▲5.6%	▲1.6%	▼0.8%
Council control before election
No overall control
Council control after election
No overall control

The 1991 West Dorset District Council election was held on Thursday 2 May 1991 to elect councillors to West Dorset District Council in England. It took place on the same day as other district council elections in the United Kingdom. The entire council was up for election. District boundary changes took place before the election but the number of seats remained the same.

The 1991 election saw the council remain in no overall control, with Independent councillors maintaining their status as the largest group.

== Ward results ==
=== Beaminster ===
Beaminster (2 seats)
Party	Candidate	Votes	%	±%
Liberal Democrats	D. Jones	1,045	41.6	+0.5
Independent	A. Hudson *	827	32.9	N/A
Conservative	D. Stebbings	638	25.4	N/A
Turnout			56.3	–1.9
Registered electors		3,049		
Liberal Democrats hold		Swing		
Independent hold		Swing		

=== Bothenhampton ===
Bothenhampton
Party	Candidate	Votes	%	±%
Conservative	D. Cracknell *	654	73.8	+5.0
Labour	M. Farmer	232	26.2	N/A
Majority		422	47.6	+9.9
Turnout			56.3	+0.1
Registered electors		1,573		
Conservative hold		Swing		

=== Bradford Abbas ===
Bradford Abbas
Party	Candidate	Votes	%	±%
Independent	E. Garrett *	unopposed	N/A	N/A
Registered electors		1,456		
Independent hold				

=== Bradpole ===
Bradpole
Party	Candidate	Votes	%	±%
Ind. Conservative	R. Coatsworth *	478	69.8	–5.8
Labour	M. Shiels	207	30.2	+5.8
Majority		271	39.6	–11.6
Turnout			40.5	+3.2
Registered electors		1,680		
Ind. Conservative hold		Swing		

=== Bridport North ===
Bridport North (3 seats)
Party	Candidate	Votes	%	±%
Labour	D. Cash *	1,062	40.7	+0.8
Labour	L. Dibdin *	975	–	
Liberal Democrats	A. Tiltman *	884	33.9	+2.2
Conservative	B. Rowe	662	25.4	–3.0
Conservative	P. Jennings	500	–	
Turnout			54.2	–7.1
Registered electors		3,321		
Labour hold		Swing		
Labour hold		Swing		
Liberal Democrats hold		Swing		

=== Bridport South ===
Bridport South (2 seats)
Party	Candidate	Votes	%	±%
Labour	C. Murless	703	31.5	N/A
Independent	C. Samways *	624	27.9	–5.3
Conservative	J. Dunford	498	22.3	–5.3
Liberal Democrats	B. Wheeler	408	18.3	–20.8
Turnout			51.7	–10.4
Registered electors		2,668		
Labour gain from Liberal Democrats		Swing		
Independent hold		Swing		

=== Broadmayne ===
Broadmayne
Party	Candidate	Votes	%	±%
Independent	A. Thacker	unopposed	N/A	N/A
Registered electors		1,430		
Independent gain from Independent				

=== Broadwindsor ===
Broadwindsor
Party	Candidate	Votes	%	±%
Liberal Democrats	J. Hardman *	368	50.8	+2.8
Conservative	R. Hibbard	319	46.2	N/A
Majority		49	7.1	+5.5
Turnout			61.2	+14.6
Registered electors		1,123		
Liberal Democrats hold		Swing		

=== Burton Bradstock ===
Burton Bradstock
Party	Candidate	Votes	%	±%
Conservative	M. Pritchard	444	64.0	N/A
Labour	K. Smith	250	36.0	N/A
Majority		194	28.0	N/A
Turnout			55.5	N/A
Registered electors		1,249		
Conservative gain from Independent				

=== Caundle Vale ===
Caundle Vale
Party	Candidate	Votes	%	±%
Independent	N. White *	355	62.1	N/A
Independent	S. Friar	217	37.9	N/A
Majority		138	24.1	N/A
Turnout			52.3	N/A
Registered electors		1,092		
Independent hold				

=== Cerne Valley ===
Cerne Valley
Party	Candidate	Votes	%	±%
Independent	R. Stenhouse *	unopposed	N/A	N/A
Registered electors		1,128		
Independent hold				

=== Charminster ===
Charminster
Party	Candidate	Votes	%	±%
Conservative	J. Kennedy	unopposed	N/A	N/A
Registered electors		1,306		
Conservative hold				

=== Charmouth ===
Charmouth
Party	Candidate	Votes	%	±%
Independent	J. Cockerill *	unopposed	N/A	N/A
Registered electors		1,325		
Independent hold				

=== Chesil Bank ===
Chesil Bank
Party	Candidate	Votes	%	±%
Independent	M. Pengelly *	unopposed	N/A	N/A
Registered electors		1,299		
Independent hold				

=== Chickerell ===
Chickerell (2 seats)
Party	Candidate	Votes	%	±%
Conservative	P. Brown *	unopposed	N/A	N/A
Conservative	I. Gardner	unopposed	N/A	N/A
Registered electors		3,377		
Conservative hold				
Conservative hold				

=== Dorchester East ===
Dorchester East (2 seats)
Party	Candidate	Votes	%	±%
Liberal Democrats	Enid Stella Jones *	978	63.6	+8.2
Liberal Democrats	T. Harries	777	–	
Conservative	J. Ridge	352	22.9	–4.8
Labour	R. Cortes	207	13.5	+6.5
Turnout			49.7	–21.1
Registered electors		2,660		
Liberal Democrats hold		Swing		
Liberal Democrats hold		Swing		

=== Dorchester North ===
Dorchester North (2 seats)
Party	Candidate	Votes	%	±%
Independent	L. Phillips *	687	42.5	+5.1
Conservative	L. Lock *	500	30.9	–0.8
Green	B. Smith	430	26.6	N/A
Green	R. Birley	386	–	
Turnout			50.1	–37.8
Registered electors		2,245		
Independent hold		Swing		
Conservative hold		Swing		

=== Dorchester South ===
Dorchester South (3 seats)
Party	Candidate	Votes	%	±%
Liberal Democrats	D. Maggs *	1,208	41.9	+8.6
Liberal Democrats	H. Dowell *	1,197	–	
Liberal Democrats	M. Rennie	1,117	–	
Conservative	M. Dowell	806	33.7	–6.2
Conservative	E. Pritchard	595	–	
Green	J. McMillan	376	15.7	+4.6
Green	R. Cumming	235	–	
Green	H. West	234	–	
Turnout			53.8	–9.6
Registered electors		4,001		
Liberal Democrats hold		Swing		
Liberal Democrats hold		Swing		
Liberal Democrats gain from Conservative		Swing		

=== Dorchester West ===
Dorchester West (3 seats)
Party	Candidate	Votes	%	±%
Labour	W. Gundry	1,000	48.1	+11.6
Labour	J. Antell *	999	–	
Liberal Democrats	E. Boothman	664	32.0	–2.2
Liberal Democrats	David Trevor Jones *	646	–	
Liberal Democrats	D. Bowring	643	–	
Labour	F. Pope	521	–	
Conservative	D. Fry	414	19.9	–9.3
Conservative	R. Burrage	349	–	
Turnout			61.0	–1.6
Registered electors		3,342		
Labour hold		Swing		
Labour gain from Liberal Democrats		Swing		
Liberal Democrats hold		Swing		

=== Frome Valley ===
Frome Valley
Party	Candidate	Votes	%	±%
Independent	M. Penfold *	unopposed	N/A	N/A
Registered electors		1,156		
Independent hold				

=== Halstock ===
Halstock
Party	Candidate	Votes	%	±%
Independent	T. Frost *	unopposed	N/A	N/A
Registered electors		1,260		
Independent hold				

=== Holnest ===
Holnest
Party	Candidate	Votes	%	±%
Independent	G. House *	unopposed	N/A	N/A
Registered electors		1,255		
Independent hold				

=== Loders ===
Loders
Party	Candidate	Votes	%	±%
Conservative	J. Newman	unopposed	N/A	N/A
Registered electors		1,105		
Conservative gain from Independent				

=== Lyme Regis ===
Lyme Regis (3 seats)
Party	Candidate	Votes	%	±%
Independent	O. Lovell *	unopposed	N/A	N/A
Conservative	S. Poupard	unopposed	N/A	N/A
Independent	D. Applebee *	unopposed	N/A	N/A
Registered electors		3,096		
Independent hold				
Conservative hold				
Independent hold				

=== Maiden Newton ===
Maiden Newton
Party	Candidate	Votes	%	±%
Independent	H. Haward *	540	77.3	N/A
Labour	E. Symonds	159	22.7	N/A
Majority		381	54.5	N/A
Turnout			59.0	N/A
Registered electors		1,196		
Independent hold				

=== Netherbury ===
Netherbury
Party	Candidate	Votes	%	±%
Conservative	G. Haynes	426	67.8	–10.2
Labour	T. Weld	202	32.2	+10.2
Majority		224	35.7	–20.4
Turnout			48.7	+1.7
Registered electors		1,294		
Conservative hold		Swing		

=== Owermoigne ===
Owermoigne (2 seats)
Party	Candidate	Votes	%	±%
SDP	J. Shuttleworth *	638	32.4	N/A
Liberal Democrats	G. Cant *	603	30.7	–25.4
Conservative	S. Dunlop	400	20.3	N/A
Conservative	R. Symes	395	–	
Labour	G. Napper	326	16.6	N/A
Turnout			56.9	+3.7
Registered electors		2,387		
SDP gain from Liberal Democrats		Swing		
Liberal Democrats hold		Swing		

=== Piddle Valley ===
Piddle Valley
Party	Candidate	Votes	%	±%
Independent	A. Read *	unopposed	N/A	N/A
Registered electors		1,374		
Independent gain from Ind. Conservative				

=== Puddletown ===
Puddletown
Party	Candidate	Votes	%	±%
Conservative	G. Harries *	unopposed	N/A	N/A
Registered electors		1,200		
Conservative hold				

=== Queen Thorne ===
Queen Thorne
Party	Candidate	Votes	%	±%
Independent	J. Brewer *	unopposed	N/A	N/A
Registered electors		1,147		
Independent hold				

=== Sherborne East ===
Sherborne East (2 seats)
Party	Candidate	Votes	%	±%
Conservative	O. Chisholm	843	54.3	+26.1
Independent	R. Bygrave	709	45.7	N/A
Conservative	J. Williams *	651	–	
Turnout			58.5	–14.2
Registered electors		2,525		
Conservative hold		Swing		
Independent gain from Independent		Swing		

=== Sherborne West ===
Sherborne West (3 seats)
Party	Candidate	Votes	%	±%
Conservative	D. Mildenhall	1,098	37.3	+8.3
Liberal Democrats	D. Baggs *	1,076	36.5	+11.7
Conservative	P. Shorland	971	–	
Conservative	S. Waddington *	899	–	
Independent	A. Mitchell	773	26.2	N/A
Turnout			60.5	–29.2
Registered electors		3,804		
Conservative hold		Swing		
Liberal Democrats hold		Swing		
Conservative gain from Independent		Swing		

=== Symondsbury ===
Symondsbury
Party	Candidate	Votes	%	±%
Conservative	G. Summers *	332	55.4	N/A
Labour	P. Lathey	267	44.6	N/A
Majority		65	10.9	N/A
Turnout			41.5	N/A
Registered electors		1,427		
Conservative hold				

=== Thorncombe ===
Thorncombe
Party	Candidate	Votes	%	±%
Conservative	J. Terrett *	unopposed	N/A	N/A
Registered electors		1,013		
Conservative hold				

=== Tolpuddle ===
Tolpuddle
Party	Candidate	Votes	%	±%
Conservative	T. Hutchinson	285	68.5	N/A
Labour	R. Pickering	131	31.5	N/A
Majority		154	37.0	N/A
Turnout			54.2	N/A
Registered electors		771		
Conservative gain from Independent				

=== Whitchurch Canonicorum ===
Whitchurch Canonicorum
Party	Candidate	Votes	%	±%
Conservative	D. Bushrod	274	38.6	–24.2
Independent	P. Hughes	229	32.3	N/A
Independent	T. Fisher	207	29.2	N/A
Majority		45	6.3	–19.3
Turnout			60.0	+0.3
Registered electors		1,182		
Conservative hold		Swing		

=== Winterborne St Martin ===
Winterborne St Martin
Party	Candidate	Votes	%	±%
Independent	S. Slade *	unopposed	N/A	N/A
Registered electors		1,905		
Independent hold				

=== Yetminster ===
Yetminster
Party	Candidate	Votes	%	±%
Conservative	H. Jordan	unopposed	N/A	N/A
Registered electors		1,349		
Conservative gain from Independent				
