= 1986 West Dorset District Council election =

1986 UK local government election

← 1984	8 May 1986	1987 →

19 of 55 seats (one third) to West Dorset District Council 28 seats needed for a majority
	First party	Second party	Third party
	Ind	Con	All
Party	Independent	Conservative	Alliance
Seats before	28	17	6
Seats won	10	3	4
Seats after	29	12	9
Seat change	▲1	▼5	▲3
Popular vote	3,978	4,028	5,027
Percentage	24.4%	24.7%	30.9%
	Fourth party	Fifth party
	IndC	Lab
Party	Ind. Conservative	Labour
Seats before	3	1
Seats won	1	1
Seats after	3	2
Seat change	Steady	▲1
Popular vote	440	2,806
Percentage	2.8%	17.2%
Council control before election
Independent
Council control after election
Independent

The 1986 West Dorset District Council election was held on Thursday 8 May 1986 to elect councillors to West Dorset District Council in England. It took place on the same day as other district council elections in the United Kingdom. One third of seats were up for election.

The 1986 election saw the Independent councillors maintain their majority control on the Council.

== Ward results ==
=== Beaminster ===
Beaminster
Party	Candidate	Votes	%	±%
Independent	E. Smalley	474	36.4	N/A
Independent	R. Bugler *	428	32.8	N/A
Alliance	J. Hardman	401	30.8	N/A
Majority		46	3.5	N/A
Turnout			46.6	N/A
Registered electors		2,794		
Independent gain from Independent				

=== Bothenhampton ===
Bothenhampton
Party	Candidate	Votes	%	±%
Ind. Conservative	D. Cracknell *	440	56.1	N/A
Alliance	I. Kent	344	43.9	N/A
Majority		96	12.2	N/A
Turnout			52.2	N/A
Registered electors		1,502		
Ind. Conservative hold				

=== Bradford Abbas ===
Bradford Abbas
Party	Candidate	Votes	%	±%
Independent	E. Garrett *	500	84.9	N/A
Labour	B. Berry	89	15.1	N/A
Majority		411	69.8	N/A
Turnout			43.9	N/A
Registered electors		1,342		
Independent hold				

=== Bridport North ===
Bridport North
Party	Candidate	Votes	%	±%
Labour	R. Wilkinson	542	39.2	+6.2
Conservative	D. Stebbings *	498	36.1	–10.2
Alliance	C. Harris	341	24.7	+4.0
Majority		44	3.2	N/A
Turnout			43.1	–6.0
Registered electors		3,204		
Labour gain from Conservative				

=== Cerne Valley ===
Cerne Valley
Party	Candidate	Votes	%	±%
Independent	R. Stenhouse	508	91.2	N/A
Labour	J. Pope	49	8.8	N/A
Majority		459	82.4	N/A
Turnout			51.8	N/A
Registered electors		1,075		
Independent gain from Independent				

=== Chickerell ===
Chickerell
Party	Candidate	Votes	%	±%
Alliance	J. Biggs	299	31.7	N/A
Conservative	P. Brown	265	28.1	–21.4
Independent	E. Edwards-Stuart *	241	25.6	N/A
Labour	J. Dickenson	137	14.5	N/A
Majority		34	3.6	N/A
Turnout			31.6	+2.0
Registered electors		2,980		
Alliance gain from Conservative				

=== Dorchester East ===
Dorchester East
Party	Candidate	Votes	%	±%
Alliance	D. Smith	466	50.2	+11.4
Conservative	C. Lucas *	326	35.1	+2.2
Labour	L. Adams	137	14.7	+6.6
Majority		140	15.1	N/A
Turnout			40.9	+9.3
Registered electors		2,269		
Alliance gain from Conservative		Swing		

=== Dorchester North ===
Dorchester North
Party	Candidate	Votes	%	±%
Conservative	L. Lock	441	46.9	+15.3
Alliance	A. Gross	318	33.8	+17.2
Labour	J. Hertslet	181	19.3	+10.4
Majority		123	13.1	N/A
Turnout			41.6	–28.4
Registered electors		2,258		
Conservative hold		Swing		

=== Dorchester South ===
Dorchester South
Party	Candidate	Votes	%	±%
Alliance	D. Maggs *	875	48.6	+13.3
Conservative	R. Burrage	751	41.7	–11.6
Labour	T. Warren	173	9.6	–1.8
Majority		124	6.9	N/A
Turnout			47.9	–4.7
Registered electors		3,759		
Alliance hold		Swing		

=== Dorchester West ===
Dorchester West
Party	Candidate	Votes	%	±%
Alliance	David Trevor Jones	688	40.5	+13.9
Conservative	G. Duke *	520	30.6	–5.0
Labour	D. Watson	491	28.9	–9.0
Majority		168	9.9	N/A
Turnout			62.5	+14.6
Registered electors		2,718		
Alliance gain from Conservative				

=== Holnest ===
Holnest
Party	Candidate	Votes	%	±%
Independent	M. Cockburn *	377	89.8	N/A
Labour	K. Jehan	43	10.2	N/A
Majority		334	79.6	N/A
Turnout			35.9	N/A
Registered electors		1,169		
Independent hold				

=== Lyme Regis ===
Lyme Regis
Party	Candidate	Votes	%	±%
Independent	D. Applebee *	unopposed	N/A	N/A
Registered electors		3,005		
Independent hold				

=== Netherbury ===
Netherbury
Party	Candidate	Votes	%	±%
Conservative	J. Peake *	451	74.9	+12.6
Labour	T. Weld	151	25.1	N/A
Majority		300	49.8	+25.1
Turnout			45.1	–4.0
Registered electors		1,335		
Conservative hold		Swing		

=== Owermoigne ===
Owermoigne
Party	Candidate	Votes	%	±%
Independent	R. Symes *	unopposed	N/A	N/A
Registered electors		2,235		
Independent hold				

=== Queen Thorne ===
Queen Thorne
Party	Candidate	Votes	%	±%
Independent	J. Brewer *	447	82.5	N/A
Labour	A. Birks-Hay	95	17.5	N/A
Majority		175	65.0	N/A
Turnout			47.6	N/A
Registered electors		1,139		
Independent hold				

=== Sherborne East ===
Sherborne East
Party	Candidate	Votes	%	±%
Independent	E. Dyke *	566	44.6	N/A
Alliance	A. Graham	444	35.0	N/A
Labour	G. Faddy	258	20.3	N/A
Majority		122	9.6	N/A
Turnout			48.1	N/A
Registered electors		2,634		
Independent hold				

=== Sherborne West ===
Sherborne West
Party	Candidate	Votes	%	±%
Conservative	S. Waddington *	776	43.7	+5.1
Alliance	L. Lewis	574	32.3	–1.3
Labour	G. Danes	425	23.9	–3.8
Majority		202	11.4	+6.4
Turnout			46.7	+0.8
Registered electors		3,798		
Conservative hold		Swing		

=== Winterborne St Martin ===
Winterborne St Martin
Party	Candidate	Votes	%	±%
Independent	S. Slade *	unopposed	N/A	N/A
Registered electors		1,771		
Independent hold				

=== Yetminster ===
Yetminster
Party	Candidate	Votes	%	±%
Independent	J. Meaden	437	58.3	N/A
Alliance	S. King	277	37.0	N/A
Labour	W. Dean	35	4.7	N/A
Majority		160	21.3	N/A
Turnout			62.2	N/A
Registered electors		1,204		
Independent gain from Conservative				
