= 2011 West Dorset District Council election =

2011 UK local government election

← 2007	5 May 2011	2015 →

48 seats to West Dorset District Council 25 seats needed for a majority
	First party	Second party
	Con	LD
Party	Conservative	Liberal Democrats
Last election	26 seats, 48.2%	16 seats, 38.7%
Seats won	32	11
Seat change	▲6	▼5
Popular vote	26,502	20,927
Percentage	43.0%	34.5%
Swing	▼5.2%	▼4.2%
	Third party
	Ind
Party	Independent
Last election	6 seats, 7.2%
Seats won	5
Seat change	▼1
Popular vote	4,593
Percentage	7.6%
Swing	▲0.4%
- Map showing the results of the 2011 West Dorset District Council elections.
Council control before election
Conservative
Council control after election
Conservative

The 2011 West Dorset District Council election was held on Thursday 5 May 2011 to elect councillors to West Dorset District Council in England. It took place on the same day as other district council elections in the United Kingdom. The whole of this 48-seat council was up for election.

The 2011 election saw the Conservatives maintain majority control of the council taking 32 of the 48 seats up for election.

== Overall results ==
2011 West Dorset District Council election
Party	Candidates						Votes		
Party	Stood	Elected	Gained	Unseated	Net	% of total	%	No.	Net %
Conservative	40	32	8	2	▲6	66.7%	43.0%	26,052	
Liberal Democrats	39	11	1	6	▼5	22.9%	34.5%	20,927	
Independent	8	5	1	2	▼1	10.4%	7.6%	4,593	
Labour	21	0			Steady	0%	10.4%	6,290	
Green	7	0			Steady	0%	3.7%	2,220	
UKIP	2	0			Steady	0%	0.8%	507	

== Ward results ==
=== Beaminster ===
Beaminster (2 seats)
Party	Candidate	Votes	%	±%
Liberal Democrats	Caroline Lucy Payne *	922	51.0	+2.4
Liberal Democrats	Janet Irene Page *	853	–	
Conservative	Sarah Anne Samuel	774	42.8	+0.6
Conservative	Peter Gerald Edward Body	731	–	
Turnout		1,836	54.45	+5.65
Registered electors		3,372		
Liberal Democrats hold		Swing		
Liberal Democrats hold		Swing		

=== Bradford Abbas ===
Bradford Abbas
Party	Candidate	Votes	%	±%
Liberal Democrats	Robin Andrew Shane Legg	493	56.7	+10.3
Conservative	Michael James Bevan	376	43.3	–4.5
Majority		117	13.5	N/A
Turnout		888	57.66	–2.04
Registered electors		1,540		
Liberal Democrats gain from Conservative		Swing		

=== Bradpole ===
Bradpole
Party	Candidate	Votes	%	±%
Conservative	Ronald William Coatsworth *	461	60.4	–10.2
Green	Julian Jones	157	20.6	+11.2
Liberal Democrats	Peter Roe	145	19.0	–1.0
Majority		304	39.8	–10.9
Turnout		766	45.57	+4.97
Registered electors		1,681		
Conservative hold		Swing		

=== Bridport North ===
Bridport North (2 seats)
Party	Candidate	Votes	%	±%
Liberal Democrats	Rosamond Catherine Kayes *	714	45.1	+10.9
Conservative	Keith Allan Day	511	32.3	–3.0
Conservative	David Anthony Johnson Bushrod	464	–	
Liberal Democrats	Christopher Martin Ray	433	–	
Green	Tess Dickson	398	25.2	+14.3
Labour	Richard Howard Nicholls	343	21.7	+11.9
Turnout		1,609	45.54	+5.04
Registered electors		3,533		
Liberal Democrats hold		Swing		
Conservative hold		Swing		

=== Bridport South & Bothenhampton ===
Bridport South & Bothenhampton (3 seats)
Party	Candidate	Votes	%	±%
Conservative	Sandra Ann Brown *	1,101	47.3	+14.1
Independent	David Robert Tett *	786	33.7	+10.1
Conservative	Frances Kathleen McKenzie	752	–	
Liberal Democrats	Karl Gareth Wallace *	671	28.8	+4.4
Liberal Democrats	Dave Rickard	668	–	
Liberal Democrats	Anne-Marie Angela Vincent	585	–	
Green	Leon Sea	382	16.4	+4.2
Labour	Martin Hugh Warne	334	14.3	+7.7
Labour	Simon Jones	259	–	
Labour	Karen Ellis	251	–	
Turnout		2,361	49.96	
Registered electors		4,726		
Conservative hold		Swing		
Independent hold		Swing		
Conservative gain from Liberal Democrats		Swing		

=== Broadmayne ===
Broadmayne
Party	Candidate	Votes	%	±%
Conservative	Alan John Thacker *	503	54.7	–10.4
Liberal Democrats	Tamara Fay Loakes	240	26.1	–8.8
Labour	Hazel Jean Gant	176	19.2	N/A
Majority		263	28.6	–1.6
Turnout		926	57.30	+11.50
Registered electors		1,616		
Conservative hold		Swing		

=== Broadwindsor ===
Broadwindsor
Party	Candidate	Votes	%	±%
Conservative	Jacqualyne Frances Irene Sewell *	588	72.9	+2.4
Liberal Democrats	Teresa Georgina Harrison	219	27.1	–2.4
Majority		369	45.7	+4.6
Turnout		832	56.87	+11.57
Registered electors		1,463		
Conservative hold		Swing		

=== Burton Bradstock ===
Burton Bradstock
Party	Candidate	Votes	%	±%
Conservative	John Patrick Russell	511	49.8	+5.0
Liberal Democrats	Lydia Josephine Roe	303	29.5	–19.8
Green	Charles Stephen Fuge	212	20.7	+14.8
Majority		208	20.3	N/A
Turnout		1,036	63.44	–1.46
Registered electors		1,633		
Conservative gain from Liberal Democrats		Swing		

=== Cam Vale ===
Cam Vale
Party	Candidate	Votes	%	±%
Conservative	Richard Jungius	unopposed	N/A	N/A
Registered electors		1,737		
Conservative gain from Liberal Democrats				

=== Charminster & Cerne Valley ===
Charminster & Cerne Valley (2 seats)
Party	Candidate	Votes	%	±%
Independent	Alistair Fraser Chisholm	936	42.9	N/A
Conservative	Sarah Jane East *	907	41.6	–17.7
Conservative	Andrew Frederick Horsington *	845	–	
Liberal Democrats	Iain Douglas Young	637	29.2	+1.4
Labour	Steve Bick	343	15.7	+2.9
Turnout		2,201	57.04	+9.64
Registered electors		3,859		
Independent gain from Conservative		Swing		
Conservative hold		Swing		

=== Charmouth ===
Charmouth
Party	Candidate	Votes	%	±%
Conservative	Jane Bremner	455	56.2	N/A
Liberal Democrats	Laura Frances Noel	355	43.8	N/A
Majority		100	12.3	N/A
Turnout		827	58.04	N/A
Registered electors		1,425		
Conservative gain from Independent		Swing		

=== Chesil Bank ===
Chesil Bank
Party	Candidate	Votes	%	±%
Conservative	Thomas William George Bartlett *	604	55.3	–10.9
Liberal Democrats	Vaughan Jones	489	44.7	+10.9
Majority		115	10.5	–21.9
Turnout		1,115	63.14	+11.64
Registered electors		1,766		
Conservative hold		Swing		

=== Chickerell ===
Chickerell (3 seats)
Party	Candidate	Votes	%	±%
Conservative	Margaret Jean Dunseith	895	47.8	+2.8
Conservative	Elaine Elizabeth Whyte *	877	–	
Conservative	Ian Charles Gardner *	842	–	
Green	Jane Burnet	471	25.1	N/A
Labour	Nigel Mykura	378	20.2	+10.6
Liberal Democrats	Gillian Lesley Fifield	325	17.3	–28.1
Liberal Democrats	Melissa Rachel Lane	322	–	
Liberal Democrats	Margaret Jean Ray	259	–	
Turnout		1,882	42.70	+5.30
Registered electors		4,407		
Conservative hold		Swing		
Conservative gain from Liberal Democrats		Swing		
Conservative gain from Liberal Democrats		Swing		

=== Chideock & Symondsbury ===
Chideock & Symondsbury
Party	Candidate	Votes	%	±%
Conservative	Gillian Esme Summers *	449	60.0	–6.4
Liberal Democrats	Philip John Colfox	299	40.0	+6.4
Majority		150	20.1	–12.7
Turnout		774	52.58	+19.78
Registered electors		1,472		
Conservative hold		Swing		

=== Dorchester East ===
Dorchester East (2 seats)
Party	Candidate	Votes	%	±%
Liberal Democrats	Enid Stella Jones *	1,046	58.4	+10.4
Liberal Democrats	Timothy Charles Nelson Harries *	902	–	
Conservative	Jonathan Halewood	478	26.7	+0.5
Labour Co-op	Barry Thompson	382	21.3	+10.9
Labour Co-op	Lesley Begley	349	–	
Turnout		1,811	49.70	+9.40
Registered electors		3,644		
Liberal Democrats hold		Swing		
Liberal Democrats hold		Swing		

=== Dorchester North ===
Dorchester North (2 seats)
Party	Candidate	Votes	%	±%
Liberal Democrats	Andrew James Canning *	945	47.3	+4.1
Liberal Democrats	Susan Caroline Hosford *	943	–	
Conservative	Peter Arne Read	547	27.4	–5.4
Conservative	Vivienne Jennifer Allan	516	–	
Labour	Anthony John Gould	257	12.9	N/A
Independent	Leonard Ernest Heath	187	9.4	N/A
Turnout		2,027	50.47	+6.77
Registered electors		4,016		
Liberal Democrats hold		Swing		
Liberal Democrats hold		Swing		

=== Dorchester South ===
Dorchester South (2 seats)
Party	Candidate	Votes	%	±%
Liberal Democrats	Molly Rennie *	1,134	60.6	+0.5
Liberal Democrats	Robin Potter *	977	–	
Conservative	William Roy Heeler	540	28.9	–11.0
Labour Co-op	Thomas Alexander Anderson	485	25.9	N/A
Turnout		1,887	56.55	+7.15
Registered electors		3,337		
Liberal Democrats hold		Swing		
Liberal Democrats hold		Swing		

=== Dorchester West ===
Dorchester West (2 seats)
Party	Candidate	Votes	%	±%
Liberal Democrats	David Trevor Jones *	923	51.2	+13.5
Independent	David John Barrett *	731	40.6	+3.4
Liberal Democrats	David Taylor	597	–	
Conservative	Innes Macdonald Robertson	366	20.3	+2.5
Labour Co-op	Victoria May Waddington-Black	329	18.3	+11.0
Labour Co-op	Lee Rhodes	322	–	
Turnout		1,825	50.64	
Registered electors		3,604		
Liberal Democrats hold		Swing		
Independent hold		Swing		

=== Frome Valley ===
Frome Valley
Party	Candidate	Votes	%	±%
Conservative	Naomi Mary Penfold *	754	70.0	–10.1
Green	Peter John Barton	323	30.0	N/A
Majority		431	40.0	–20.1
Turnout		1,088	60.31	+9.41
Registered electors		1,804		
Conservative hold		Swing		

=== Halstock ===
Halstock
Party	Candidate	Votes	%	±%
Independent	Tony Metford	unopposed	N/A	N/A
Registered electors		1,534		
Independent gain from Independent				

=== Loders ===
Loders
Party	Candidate	Votes	%	±%
Conservative	Mark Brandon Roberts *	459	61.8	–4.5
Liberal Democrats	Charlotte Fleischmann	283	38.1	+4.4
Majority		176	23.7	–8.9
Turnout		760	51.74	
Registered electors		1,469		
Conservative hold		Swing		

=== Lyme Regis ===
Lyme Regis (2 seats)
Party	Candidate	Votes	%	±%
Conservative	Daryl Whane Turner *	716	45.7	+16.2
Conservative	George Symonds	654	–	
Independent	Patrick William James Hicks *	578	36.9	+6.2
Independent	Owen Keith Lovell	506	32.3	N/A
Liberal Democrats	Margaret Ann Sargant	504	32.2	–7.7
Turnout		1,594	53.49	+5.69
Registered electors		2,980		
Conservative gain from Independent		Swing		
Conservative gain from Liberal Democrats		Swing		

=== Maiden Newton ===
Maiden Newton
Party	Candidate	Votes	%	±%
Conservative	Gillian Mary Haynes	523	56.4	N/A
Liberal Democrats	David Murray Cuckson	217	23.4	N/A
Labour	David Machin	188	20.3	N/A
Turnout		945	56.93	N/A
Registered electors		1,660		
Conservative hold		Swing		

=== Marshwood Vale ===
Marshwood Vale
Party	Candidate	Votes	%	±%
Conservative	Michael Disney Robinson *	572	67.5	+5.5
Liberal Democrats	Howard John Thomas	276	32.5	–5.5
Majority		296	34.9	+11.0
Turnout		863	60.95	+10.15
Registered electors		1,416		
Conservative hold		Swing		

=== Netherbury ===
Netherbury
Party	Candidate	Votes	%	±%
Conservative	Anthony Paul Robin Alford *	436	55.1	–12.3
Liberal Democrats	Edward Timothy Colfox	356	44.9	+12.3
Majority		80	10.1	–24.7
Turnout		818	50.12	+14.92
Registered electors		1,632		
Conservative hold		Swing		

=== Owermoigne ===
Owermoigne (2 seats)
Party	Candidate	Votes	%	±%
Conservative	Teresa Mary Seall *	909	56.4	+0.9
Conservative	Peter Jonathon Stein	705	–	
Labour	Gerald Thomas Harold Napper	527	32.7	+19.8
Liberal Democrats	Robert Henry Armstrong	511	31.7	–
Turnout		1,614	52.35	+1.85
Registered electors		3,083		
Conservative hold		Swing		
Conservative hold		Swing		

=== Piddle Valley ===
Piddle Valley
Party	Candidate	Votes	%	±%
Conservative	Jacqueline Ann Cuff	707	76.0	–9.0
Labour	Joseph Michael Upton	223	24.0	N/A
Majority		484	52.0	–17.9
Turnout		950	57.65	+11.45
Registered electors		1,648		
Conservative hold		Swing		

=== Puddletown ===
Puddletown
Party	Candidate	Votes	%	±%
Conservative	Robert Patrick Gordon Cooke *	568	51.1	N/A
Liberal Democrats	Teresa Catherine James	352	31.7	N/A
Labour	Paul David Poser	191	17.2	N/A
Majority		216	19.4	N/A
Turnout		1,115	55.95	N/A
Registered electors		1,993		
Conservative hold		Swing		

=== Queen Thorne ===
Queen Thorne
Party	Candidate	Votes	%	±%
Conservative	Robert Andrew Gould *	721	75.4	–6.1
Independent	Andrew Stephen Leppard	235	24.6	N/A
Majority		486	50.8	–12.2
Turnout		962	57.85	+12.85
Registered electors		1,663		
Conservative hold		Swing		

=== Sherborne East ===
Sherborne East (2 seats)
Party	Candidate	Votes	%	±%
Conservative	Terence Peter Farmer *	836	47.7	+0.9
Conservative	Dominic Charles Elliot *	717	–	
Liberal Democrats	Michael John Sandy	475	27.1	+10.1
Liberal Democrats	Guy Justin Patterson	386	–	
Green	Jenny Susan Greene	277	15.8	–9.6
Labour	Robert James Bygrave	250	14.3	+3.5
UKIP	Oliver Marshall Chisholm	236	13.5	N/A
Labour	Graham Parish	185	–	
Turnout		1,778	50.97	+8.47
Registered electors		3,488		
Conservative hold		Swing		
Conservative hold		Swing		

=== Sherborne West ===
Sherborne West (2 seats)
Party	Candidate	Votes	%	±%
Conservative	Peter Robert Shorland *	889	50.5	–14.3
Conservative	Marjorie Snowden *	781	–	
Liberal Democrats	Elizabeth Katherine Fone	500	28.4	–6.8
Liberal Democrats	Russell Jonathan Willson	329	–	
Labour	Kathryn Parish	321	18.2	N/A
UKIP	Peter Jenkins	271	15.4	N/A
Turnout		1,776	50.34	+8.14
Registered electors		3,528		
Conservative hold		Swing		
Conservative hold		Swing		

=== Winterborne St Martin ===
Winterborne St Martin
Party	Candidate	Votes	%	±%
Independent	Stephen John Slade *	634	76.3	N/A
Labour	Richard John Baker	197	23.7	N/A
Turnout		851	50.12	N/A
Registered electors		1,698		
Independent hold		Swing		

=== Yetminster ===
Yetminster
Party	Candidate	Votes	%	±%
Conservative	Margaret Rose Lawrence *	478	58.7	+3.6
Liberal Democrats	Josephine Jones	337	41.3	–3.6
Majority		141	17.3	+7.0
Turnout		826	61.05	+7.65
Registered electors		1,353		
Conservative hold		Swing		

== By-elections between 2011 and 2015 ==
=== Cam Vale ===
A by-election was held for the Cam Vale ward of West Dorset District Council on 2 May 2013 following the death of Conservative councillor Richard Jungius.

Cam Vale by-election 2 May 2013
Party	Candidate	Votes	%	±%
Conservative	Christopher Lionel John Loder	335	43.0	N/A
Liberal Democrats	Michael John Sandy	252	32.3	N/A
UKIP	Peter Jenkins	192	24.6	N/A
Majority		83	10.7	N/A
Turnout			53	N/A
Conservative hold		Swing		
