= 2015 West Dorset District Council election =

2015 UK local government election

← 2011	7 May 2015

44 seats to West Dorset District Council 23 seats needed for a majority
	First party	Second party
	Con	LD
Party	Conservative	Liberal Democrats
Last election	32 seats, 43.0%	11 seats, 34.5%
Seats won	30	12
Seat change	▼2	▲1
Popular vote	43,608	29,432
Percentage	44.6%	30.1%
Swing	▲1.6%	▼4.4%
- Map showing the results of the 2015 West Dorset District Council elections.
Council control before election
Conservative
Council control after election
Conservative

The 2015 West Dorset District Council election was held on Thursday 7 May 2015 to elect councillors to West Dorset District Council in England. It took place on the same day as the general election and other district council elections in the United Kingdom. A series of boundary changes saw the number of councillors reduced from 48 to 44.

These were the final elections of the district council, before its abolition on 1 April 2019 when it was merged with the other districts of Dorset and Dorset County Council to form a new unitary authority Dorset Council.

The 2015 election saw the Conservatives maintain majority control of the council taking 30 of the 44 seats up for election.

== Overall results ==
2015 West Dorset District Council election
Party	Candidates						Votes		
Party	Stood	Elected	Gained	Unseated	Net	% of total	%	No.	Net %
Conservative	39	30			▼2	68.2%	44.6%	43,608	▲1.6%
Liberal Democrats	34	12			▲1	27.3%	30.1%	29,432	▼4.4%
Green	27	0			Steady	0%	12.8%	12,474	▲9.1%
Labour	16	0			Steady	0%	7.7%	7,569	▼2.7%
UKIP	7	0			Steady	0%	2.6%	2,561	▲1.8%
Independent	4	0			▼5	0%	2.1%	2,087	▼5.5%

== Ward results ==
=== Beaminster ===
Beaminster (2 seats)
Party	Candidate	Votes	%	±%
Conservative	Anthony Paul Robin Alford	1,393	44.0	+1.2
Conservative	Peter Nathaniel David Barrowcliff	1,364	–	
Liberal Democrats	Jan Page *	1,254	39.6	–11.4
Liberal Democrats	Chris Turner	855	–	
Green	Kerry-Anne Gould	548	13.8	N/A
Turnout		3,207	75.00	+20.55
Registered electors		4,276		
Conservative gain from Liberal Democrats		Swing		
Conservative gain from Liberal Democrats		Swing		

=== Bridport North ===
Bridport North (3 seats)
Party	Candidate	Votes	%	±%
Liberal Democrats	Ros Kayes *	1,921	47.3	
Conservative	Ronald William Coatsworth *	1,526	37.6	
Conservative	Keith Allan Day *	1,286	–	
Conservative	Jeremy Patrick Brodie	1,253	–	
Liberal Democrats	Sarah Anne Horniman	942	–	
Liberal Democrats	Gill Massey	830	–	
Green	Julian Stephen Langton	824	20.3	
Labour	Nick Boothroyd	647	15.9	
Labour	Karen Ellis	509	–	
Labour	Ivan Gollop	465	–	
Turnout		4,128	66.59	
Registered electors		6,199		
Liberal Democrats win (new seat)				
Conservative win (new seat)				
Conservative win (new seat)				

=== Bridport South ===
Bridport South (3 seats)
Party	Candidate	Votes	%	±%
Conservative	Sandra Ann Brown *	1,577	42.4	
Liberal Democrats	Dave Rickard	1,194	32.1	
Conservative	Frances Kathleen McKenzie *	1,173	–	
Liberal Democrats	Clare Jane Winterbottom	1,064	–	
Independent	David Robert Tett *	961	24.7	
Green	Kevin Charles Clayton	795	21.4	
Green	Christopher Rakoczi	650	–	
Labour	Debra Bates	644	17.3	
Liberal Democrats	Clare Jane Winterbottom	610	–	
Labour	Richard Howard Nicholls	570	–	
Turnout		3,773	68.99	
Registered electors		5,469		
Conservative win (new seat)				
Liberal Democrats win (new seat)				
Conservative win (new seat)				

=== Broadmayne & Crossways ===
Broadmayne & Crossways (2 seats)
Party	Candidate	Votes	%	±%
Conservative	Nigel Paul Bundy	928	41.8	
Conservative	Alan John Thacker *	688	–	
Liberal Democrats	Nick Ireland	557	25.1	
Liberal Democrats	Gillian Peason	519	–	
Green	Jo Archer	280	12.6	
Labour	Diana Ruth Staines	274	12.3	
Independent	Philip Howard Scull	168	7.6	
Turnout		2,221	76.06	
Registered electors		4,367		
Conservative win (new seat)				
Conservative win (new seat)				

=== Broadwindsor ===
Broadwindsor
Party	Candidate	Votes	%	±%
Conservative	Jacqui Sewell *	922	55.2	–17.7
Liberal Democrats	Edward Gerrard	314	18.8	–8.3
UKIP	Annemieke Blodeel	227	13.6	N/A
Green	Kit Vaughan	208	12.4	N/A
Majority		608	36.4	–9.3
Turnout		1,687	76.89	+20.02
Registered electors		2,194		
Conservative hold		Swing		

=== Burton Bradstock ===
Burton Bradstock
Party	Candidate	Votes	%	±%
Conservative	John Patrick Russell *	935	54.5	+4.7
Green	Steve Meek	392	22.8	+2.1
Liberal Democrats	Terry Harrison	390	22.7	–6.8
Majority		543	31.6	+11.3
Turnout		1,743	79.84	+16.40
Registered electors		2,183		
Conservative hold		Swing		

=== Cerne Valley ===
Cerne Valley (2 seats)
Party	Candidate	Votes	%	±%
Conservative	Fred Horsington	1,502	48.9	
Conservative	Timothy John Yarker	1,398	–	
Liberal Democrats	Iain Douglas Young	787	25.6	
Liberal Democrats	Jillian Annas Mahler	720	–	
Green	Anne Clements	643	20.9	
Labour	Lynda Ann Kiss	509	16.6	
Turnout		3,115	75.15	
Registered electors		4,145		
Conservative win (new seat)				
Conservative win (new seat)				

=== Chickerell & Chesil Bank ===
Chickerell & Chesil Bank (3 seats)
Party	Candidate	Votes	%	±%
Conservative	Jean Dunseith *	1,889	48.2	
Conservative	Tom Bartlett *	1,734	–	
Conservative	Ian Charles Gardner *	1,711	–	
Liberal Democrats	Ryan Dean Hope	1,039	26.5	
Green	Vaughan Jones	986	25.2	
Labour	Robert William Kiss	975	24.9	
Turnout		3,977	70.15	
Registered electors		5,669		
Conservative win (new seat)				
Conservative win (new seat)				
Conservative win (new seat)				

=== Chideock & Symondsbury ===
Chideock & Symondsbury
Party	Candidate	Votes	%	±%
Conservative	Simon John Christopher	823	56.4	–3.6
Green	Yen C Chong	349	23.9	N/A
Liberal Democrats	Philip Colfox	318	21.8	–18.2
Majority		474	32.5	+12.4
Turnout		1,483	73.42	+20.84
Registered electors		2,020		
Conservative hold		Swing		

=== Dorchester East ===
Dorchester East (2 seats)
Party	Candidate	Votes	%	±%
Liberal Democrats	Stella Jones *	1,223	48.8	–9.6
Liberal Democrats	Timothy Harries *	971	–	
Conservative	Liz Godolphin	752	30.0	+3.3
Green	Jenny Shackleford	511	20.4	N/A
Labour	Barry Thompson	508	20.3	–1.0
Green	Len Herbert	372	–	
Turnout		2,549	67.42	+17.74
Registered electors		3,781		
Liberal Democrats hold		Swing		
Liberal Democrats hold		Swing		

=== Dorchester North ===
Dorchester North (3 seats)
Party	Candidate	Votes	%	±%
Liberal Democrats	Andy Canning *	1,042	35.6	
Liberal Democrats	Susie Hosford *	868	–	
Liberal Democrats	David Taylor	806		
Independent	Alistair Fraser Chisholm *	762	26.1	
Conservative	Ian Francois Bernard Gosling	722	24.7	
Conservative	Margaret Morrissey	718	–	
Conservative	Warwick Harry Taylor	646	–	
Labour	Claudia Catherine Sorin	493	16.9	
UKIP	Geoffrey Robin Markham	455	15.6	
Green	Vicki Waddington-Black	422	14.4	
Green	Libby Goodchild	416	–	
Green	Murray David Shackleford	309	–	
Turnout		2,941	66.63	
Registered electors		4,414		
Liberal Democrats win (new seat)				
Liberal Democrats win (new seat)				
Liberal Democrats win (new seat)				

=== Dorchester South ===
Dorchester South (2 seats)
Party	Candidate	Votes	%	±%
Liberal Democrats	Molly Rennie *	1,302	48.2	–12.4
Liberal Democrats	Robert Potter *	1,007	–	
Conservative	Antony Gilbert Butler Stanley	786	29.1	+0.2
Labour	Frances Thorpe Anderson	454	16.8	–9.1
UKIP	Neale Hallett	434	16.1	N/A
Green	Kate Penelope Forrester	421	15.6	N/A
Green	Mark Stephen Smith	300	–	
Turnout		2,726	76.08	+19.53
Registered electors		3,853		
Liberal Democrats hold		Swing		
Liberal Democrats hold		Swing		

=== Dorchester West ===
Dorchester West (2 seats)
Party	Candidate	Votes	%	±%
Liberal Democrats	David Trevor Jones *	1,152	45.3	–5.9
Conservative	Gerald Edward Barnaby Duke	725	28.5	+8.2
Liberal Democrats	Roland Garth Tarr	702	–	
Conservative	Peter Jonathon Stein	684	–	
Labour	Lee Rhodes	676	26.6	+8.3
Green	Judith Caroline Edwards	577	22.7	N/A
Turnout		2,546	67.95	+17.31
Registered electors		3,747		
Liberal Democrats hold		Swing		
Conservative gain from Independent		Swing		

=== Frome Valley ===
Frome Valley
Party	Candidate	Votes	%	±%
Conservative	Mary Penfold *	1,099	72.2	+2.2
Green	Rebekah Webb	424	27.8	–2.2
Majority		675	44.3	+4.3
Turnout		1,546	78.42	+18.11
Registered electors		1,974		
Conservative hold		Swing		

=== Lyme Regis & Charmouth ===
Lyme Regis & Charmouth (2 seats)
Party	Candidate	Votes	%	±%
Conservative	George Jacob Symonds *	1,470	50.3	
Conservative	Daryl Whane Turner *	1,461	–	
Liberal Democrats	Janice Ruth Gale	836	28.6	
Green	Matthew Daniel Holborow	606	20.7	
Liberal Democrats	Stephen William Trevethan	551	–	
Independent	Stephen Leonard Miller	196	6.7	
Turnout		2,968	72.34	
Registered electors		4,103		
Conservative win (new seat)				
Conservative win (new seat)				

=== Maiden Newton ===
Maiden Newton
Party	Candidate	Votes	%	±%
Conservative	Gill Haynes *	940	60.6	+4.2
Green	Benjamin Tyler	375	24.2	N/A
Labour Co-op	Geoff Freeman	237	15.3	–5.0
Majority		565	36.4	+3.4
Turnout		1,580	75.31	+18.38
Registered electors		2,098		
Conservative hold		Swing		

=== Netherbury ===
Netherbury
Party	Candidate	Votes	%	±%
Conservative	Mark Brandon Roberts *	919	57.4	+2.3
Liberal Democrats	Anthea Carol Bay	406	25.4	–19.5
Green	Richard Edwards	275	17.2	N/A
Majority		513	32.1	+22.0
Turnout		1,618	74.84	+35.14
Registered electors		2,162		
Conservative hold		Swing		

=== Piddle Valley ===
Piddle Valley
Party	Candidate	Votes	%	±%
Conservative	Peter John Hiscock	1,095	68.8	–7.2
Green	Hilary Woodall	315	19.8	N/A
Labour	David John Marriott	182	11.4	–12.6
Majority		780	49.0	–3.0
Turnout		1,614	74.24	+16.59
Registered electors		2,174		
Conservative hold		Swing		

=== Puddletown ===
Puddletown
Party	Candidate	Votes	%	±%
Conservative	Patrick Cooke *	893	57.1	+6.0
Liberal Democrats	Mel Lane	300	19.2	–12.5
Labour	Tony Gould	220	14.1	–3.1
Green	Caspar Edward Hulacki	150	9.6	N/A
Majority		593	37.9	+18.5
Turnout		1,573	83.58	+27.63
Registered electors		2,053		
Conservative hold		Swing		

=== Queen Thorne ===
Queen Thorne
Party	Candidate	Votes	%	±%
Conservative	Robert Andrew Gould *	1,017	67.0	–8.4
UKIP	Peter Jenkins	274	18.2	N/A
Green	Natalie Jane Miles	226	14.9	N/A
Majority		743	49.0	–1.8
Turnout		1,524	75.11	+17.26
Registered electors		2,029		
Conservative hold		Swing		

=== Sherborne East ===
Sherborne East (2 seats)
Party	Candidate	Votes	%	±%
Conservative	Dominic Charles Elliott *	1,214	45.0	–2.7
Conservative	Terence Peter Falmer *	1,119	–	
Liberal Democrats	Guy Justin Patterson	871	32.3	+5.2
Green	Susan Greene	802	29.7	+13.9
UKIP	David Platt	530	19.7	+6.2
Turnout		2,722	68.78	+17.81
Registered electors		3,959		
Conservative hold		Swing		
Conservative hold		Swing		

=== Sherborne West ===
Sherborne West (2 seats)
Party	Candidate	Votes	%	±%
Liberal Democrats	Matthew Nathan William Hall	927	42.4	+14.0
Conservative	Peter Robert Shorland *	881	40.3	–10.2
Conservative	Chris Shaw	831	–	
Liberal Democrats	Jan Palmer	792	–	
UKIP	Christopher Binding	410	18.8	+3.4
Turnout		2,238	68.71	+18.37
Registered electors		3,257		
Liberal Democrats gain from Conservative		Swing		
Conservative hold		Swing		

=== Winterborne St Martin ===
Winterborne St Martin
Party	Candidate	Votes	%	±%
Conservative	Robert Philip Freeman	666	47.5	N/A
Green	Matthew James McCourtie	298	21.3	N/A
UKIP	Graham Richard Brant	231	16.5	N/A
Labour	Hazel Jean Gant	206	14.7	–9.0
Majority		368	26.3	N/A
Turnout		1,409	71.56	+21.44
Registered electors		1,969		
Conservative gain from Independent		Swing		

=== Yetminster & Cam Vale ===
Yetminster & Cam Vale (2)
Party	Candidate	Votes	%	±%
Conservative	Margaret Rose Lawrence *	1,497	50.8	
Liberal Democrats	Robin Andrew Shane Legg *	1,374	46.6	
Conservative	Christopher Lionel John Loder *	1,371	–	
Liberal Democrats	Michael John Sandy	988	–	
Turnout		2,987	78.11	
Registered electors		3,824		
Conservative win (new seat)				
Liberal Democrats win (new seat)				

== By-elections between 2015 and 2019 ==
=== Piddle Valley ===
A by-election was held for the Piddle Valley ward of West Dorset District Council on 13 April 2017 following the resignation of Conservative councillor Peter Hiscock.

Piddle Valley by-election 13 April 2017
Party	Candidate	Votes	%	±%
Conservative	Brian Haynes	303	60.8	–8.0
Green	Carol Rosemary Byrom	195	39.2	+19.4
Majority		108	21.6	–27.4
Turnout		498	23.74	–50.50
Registered electors		2,098		
Conservative hold		Swing		

=== Lyme Regis & Charmouth ===
A by-election was held for one of the two seats in the Lyme Regis & Charmouth ward of West Dorset District Council on 14 September 2017 following the resignation of Conservative councillor George Symonds.

Lyme Regis & Charmouth by-election 14 September 2017
Party	Candidate	Votes	%	±%
Independent	Cheryl Lesley Reynolds	622	52.3	N/A
Conservative	Paul Ronald Oatway	396	33.3	–17.0
Labour	Belinda Bawden	171	14.4	N/A
Majority		226	19.0	N/A
Turnout		1,189	28.9	
Independent gain from Conservative		Swing		

=== Bridport North ===
A by-election was held for one of the three seats in the Bridport North ward of West Dorset District Council on 22 February 2018 following the resignation of Liberal Democrat councillor Ros Kayes.

Bridport North by-election 22 February 2018
Party	Candidate	Votes	%	±%
Conservative	Derek Bussell	600	36.0	+5.0
Liberal Democrats	Sarah Williams	500	30.0	−9.1
Labour	Phyllida Culpin	383	23.0	+9.8
Green	Julian Jones	184	11.0	−5.8
Majority		100	6.0	
Turnout		1,667		
Conservative gain from Liberal Democrats		Swing		
