= Puncknowle =

Village and civil parish in Dorset, England

Coordinates: 50.6955°N 2.6583°W

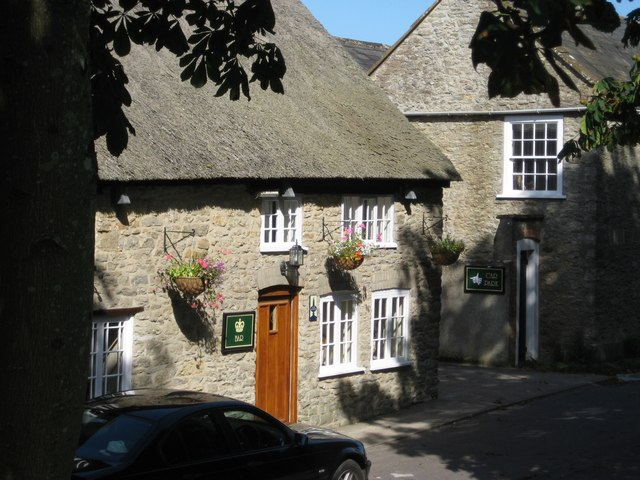
- The Crown public house from the churchyard

- Location within Dorset
- Population: 466
- OS grid reference: SY535886
- Unitary authority: Dorset
- Ceremonial county: Dorset
- Region: South West
- Country: England
- Sovereign state: United Kingdom
- Post town: Dorchester
- Postcode district: DT2
- Police: Dorset
- Fire: Dorset and Wiltshire
- Ambulance: South Western
- UK Parliament: West Dorset

Puncknowle ( /ˈpʌnəl/ PUN-əl) is a village and civil parish in the county of Dorset in southwest England, situated on the southern slopes of the Bride Valley approximately 5 miles (8.0 km) east of Bridport and 1.5 miles (2.4 km) north of Chesil Beach on the Jurassic Coast. In the 2011 census the parish—which includes the coastal settlement of West Bexington to the south—had a population of 466.

Puncknowle village has a Jacobean manor house, which in 1906 Sir Frederick Treves described as "one of the daintiest and most beautiful manor houses in the county". The Napier family, who came to Puncknowle from Merchiston in Scotland, were lords of the manor for three centuries, until the early 18th century. In the early 19th century the manor was occupied by Colonel Shrapnel, inventor of the shrapnel shell.

Puncknowle parish church, dedicated to St Mary, has a 12th-century chancel arch and west tower, though the latter was altered in 1678. The nave and the rest of the chancel were largely rebuilt at various dates in the 19th century. The church contains memorials to the Napiers and has an unusual font, composed of a Norman bowl on top of another font from West Bexington church, which French forces destroyed in the 16th century.

There is a single public house in the village called The Crown Inn, and many holiday properties.
