= West Bexington =

Coordinates: 50.678°N 2.654°W

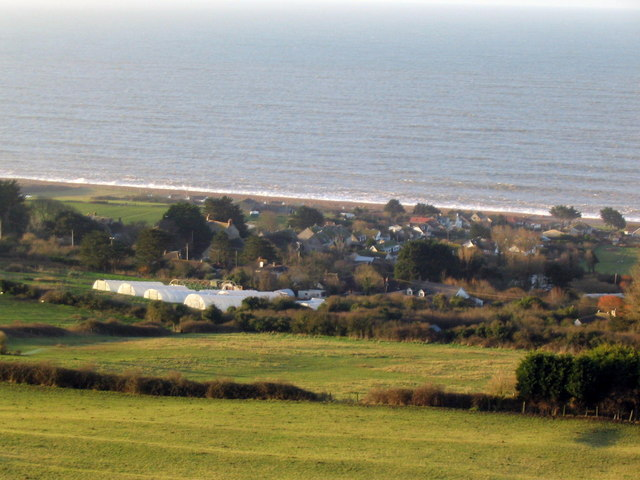
- West Bexington viewed from inland

- Location within Dorset
- OS grid reference: SY533868
- Civil parish: Puncknowle
- Unitary authority: Dorset
- Ceremonial county: Dorset
- Region: South West
- Country: England
- Sovereign state: United Kingdom
- Post town: DORCHESTER
- Postcode district: DT2
- Dialling code: 01308
- Police: Dorset
- Fire: Dorset and Wiltshire
- Ambulance: South Western
- UK Parliament: West Dorset

West Bexington is a village in south-west Dorset, England, sited just behind the Chesil Beach about 6 miles (10 km) southeast of Bridport. It forms part of the civil parish of Puncknowle. The coast here is part of the Jurassic Coast, a World Heritage Site.

== History ==
In the Domesday Book of 1086 the estate here was recorded as Bessintone; it had twenty households and was owned by a Roger Arundel.

The majority of the present houses in West Bexington were built between 1919 and 1939, on plots of farmland which had been sold due to the land becoming agriculturally derelict. At the same time a swimming pool was also built behind the beach. The older manor house and farm buildings are still present and there are a number of more modern houses.

== Nature reserve ==
The village of West Bexington provides access to the Chesil Beach. The West Bexington nature reserve is one of the Dorset Wildlife Trust's few coastal reserves. It is internationally important because of the rare vegetated shingle habitat that thrives here (Rock Samphire, Sea Beet, Sea Campion, Sea Kale, Tree Mallow, Tufted Vetch, Wild Carrot, Wild Parsnip, Woody Nightshade, Yellow Horned Poppy and Yellow Iris).
