= 1983 West Dorset District Council election =

1983 UK local government election

- 5 May 1983

All 55 seats to West Dorset District Council 28 seats needed for a majority
	First party	Second party	Third party
Party	Independent	Conservative	Alliance
Last election	37 seats, 42.1%	7 seats, 20.9%	8 seats, 24.8%
Seats won	30	15	6
Seat change	▼7	▲8	▼2
Popular vote	7,666	10,923	8,871
Percentage	26.0%	37.1%	30.1%
Swing	▼16.1%	▲16.2%	▲5.3%
	Fourth party	Fifth party
Party	Ind. Conservative	Labour
Last election	1 seat, 0.6%	2 seats, 10.8%
Seats won	3	1
Seat change	▲2	▼1
Popular vote	N/A	2,009
Percentage	N/A	6.8%
Swing	▼0.6%	▼4.0%
Council control before election
Independent
Council control after election
Independent

The 1983 West Dorset District Council election was held on Thursday 5 May 1983 to elect councillors to West Dorset District Council in England. It took place on the same day as other district council elections in the United Kingdom. The entire council was up for election, following boundary changes that reduced the number of wards by two, but altogether the number of seats remained the same. Subsequent elections for the council would be elected by thirds following the passing of a resolution under section 7 (4) (b) of the Local Government Act 1972.

The 1983 election saw the Independent councillors lose seats but maintain their majority control on the Council.

== Ward results ==
=== Beaminster ===
Beaminster (2 seats)
Party	Candidate	Votes	%	±%
Independent	A. Hudson *	unopposed	N/A	N/A
Independent	R. Bugler *	unopposed	N/A	N/A
Registered electors		2,794		
Independent hold				
Independent hold				

=== Bothenhampton ===
Bothenhampton
Party	Candidate	Votes	%	±%
Ind. Conservative	D. Cracknell	unopposed	N/A	N/A
Registered electors		1,502		
Ind. Conservative gain from Independent				

=== Bradford Abbas ===
Bradford Abbas
Party	Candidate	Votes	%	±%
Independent	E. Garrett *	unopposed	N/A	N/A
Registered electors		1,342		
Independent hold				

=== Bradpole ===
Bradpole
Party	Candidate	Votes	%	±%
Ind. Conservative	R. Coatsworth *	unopposed	N/A	N/A
Registered electors		1,464		
Ind. Conservative hold		Swing		

=== Bridport North ===
Bridport North (3 seats)
Party	Candidate	Votes	%	±%
Alliance	A. Tiltman *	780	37.3	N/A
Conservative	D. Stebbings	682	32.6	N/A
Labour	D. Cash	629	30.1	N/A
Alliance	P. Foote	441	–	
Alliance	H. Draper	353	–	
Turnout			67.5	N/A
Registered electors		3,096		
Alliance win (new seat)				
Conservative win (new seat)				
Labour win (new seat)				

=== Bridport South ===
Bridport South (2 seats)
Party	Candidate	Votes	%	±%
Independent	C. Samways *	unopposed	N/A	N/A
Alliance	A. Bell *	unopposed	N/A	N/A
Registered electors		2,465		
Independent win (new seat)				
Alliance win (new seat)				

=== Broadmayne ===
Broadmayne
Party	Candidate	Votes	%	±%
Alliance	B. Course *	354	53.8	–11.1
Conservative	I. Cobbold	304	46.2	+11.1
Majority		50	7.6	–22.3
Turnout			52.7	—26.2
Registered electors		1,249		
Alliance hold		Swing		

=== Broadwindsor ===
Broadwindsor
Party	Candidate	Votes	%	±%
Independent	C. Coate *	unopposed	N/A	N/A
Registered electors		1,049		
Independent hold				

=== Burton Bradstock ===
Burton Bradstock
Party	Candidate	Votes	%	±%
Independent	R. Bailey *	unopposed	N/A	N/A
Registered electors		1,137		
Independent hold				

=== Caundle Vale ===
Caundle Vale
Party	Candidate	Votes	%	±%
Independent	N. White *	unopposed	N/A	N/A
Registered electors		1,048		
Independent hold				

=== Cerne Valley ===
Cerne Valley
Party	Candidate	Votes	%	±%
Independent	Dione Digby, Lady Digby *	unopposed	N/A	N/A
Registered electors		1,075		
Independent hold				

=== Charminster ===
Charminster
Party	Candidate	Votes	%	±%
Independent	E. Hanford *	270	42.3	N/A
Conservative	B. Woodhouse	252	39.4	N/A
Alliance	G. Halliwell	117	18.3	N/A
Majority		18	2.9	N/A
Turnout			49.0	N/A
Registered electors		1,255		
Independent hold				

=== Charmouth ===
Charmouth
Party	Candidate	Votes	%	±%
Independent	J. Cockerill	441	65.8	N/A
Independent	J. Robinson	229	34.2	N/A
Majority		212	31.6	N/A
Turnout			52.2	N/A
Registered electors		1,284		
Independent gain from Independent				

=== Chesil Bank ===
Chesil Bank
Party	Candidate	Votes	%	±%
Independent	M. Pengelly *	unopposed	N/A	N/A
Registered electors		1,269		
Independent hold				

=== Chickerell ===
Chickerell (2 seats)
Party	Candidate	Votes	%	±%
Conservative	E. Edwards-Stuart *	643	63.9	N/A
Independent	W. McCarthy *	364	–	N/A
Independent	P. Brown	185	–	N/A
Independent	E. Davies	172	–	N/A
Turnout			34.6	N/A
Registered electors		2,912		
Conservative hold				
Independent hold				

=== Dorchester East ===
Dorchester East (2 seats)
Party	Candidate	Votes	%	±%
Alliance	Enid Stella Jones *	588	38.8	N/A
Conservative	C. Lucas *	499	32.9	N/A
Alliance	D. Smith	428	–	
Conservative	J. Graham	310	–	
Labour	E. Adams	123	8.1	N/A
Labour	P. Warner	121	–	
Turnout			66.8	N/A
Registered electors		2,269		
Alliance win (new seat)				
Conservative win (new seat)				

=== Dorchester North ===
Dorchester North (2 seats)
Party	Candidate	Votes	%	±%
Independent	L. Phillips *	678	–	N/A
Conservative	C. Thatcher	499	31.6	N/A
Alliance	J. Walker	262	16.6	N/A
Alliance	T. Harries	262	–	
Labour	J. Hertslet	141	8.9	N/A
Turnout			70.0	N/A
Registered electors		2,258		
Independent win (new seat)				
Conservative win (new seat)				

=== Dorchester South ===
Dorchester South (3 seats)
Party	Candidate	Votes	%	±%
Conservative	P. Seaton *	1,077	56.0	N/A
Alliance	D. Maggs	847	44.0	N/A
Conservative	J. Hebb	820	–	
Conservative	D. Lang	782	–	
Alliance	H. Nicholson *	781	–	
Alliance	S. Pritchard	774	–	
Turnout			52.6	N/A
Registered electors		3,657		
Conservative win (new seat)				
Alliance win (new seat)				
Conservative win (new seat)				

=== Dorchester West ===
Dorchester West (3 seats)
Party	Candidate	Votes	%	±%
Conservative	G. Powell *	743	46.8	N/A
Conservative	G. Duke	561	–	
Conservative	F. Alderman *	548	–	
Liberal	E. Boothman *	544	34.2	N/A
Liberal	D. Bowring	509	–	
Liberal	David Trevor Jones *	500	–	
Labour	D. Watson	302	19.0	N/A
Labour	T. Warren	284	–	
Labour	J. Yeomans	241	–	
Turnout			75.5	N/A
Registered electors		2,106		
Conservative win (new seat)				
Conservative win (new seat)				
Conservative win (new seat)				

=== Frome Valley ===
Frome Valley
Party	Candidate	Votes	%	±%
Independent	B. Bryant *	unopposed	N/A	N/A
Registered electors		1,031		
Independent hold				

=== Halstock ===
Halstock
Party	Candidate	Votes	%	±%
Independent	T. Frost *	unopposed	N/A	N/A
Registered electors		1,176		
Independent hold				

=== Holnest ===
Holnest
Party	Candidate	Votes	%	±%
Independent	M. Cockburn *	unopposed	N/A	N/A
Registered electors		1,169		
Independent hold				

=== Loders ===
Loders
Party	Candidate	Votes	%	±%
Independent	D. Fry	unopposed	N/A	N/A
Registered electors		1,011		
Independent gain from Independent				

=== Lyme Regis ===
Lyme Regis (3 seats)
Party	Candidate	Votes	%	±%
Independent	J. Broom *	823	–	
Independent	D. Applebee	819	–	
Independent	J. Nuttall *	729	–	
Conservative	V. Homyer *	531	39.2	N/A
Turnout			46.7	–30.9
Registered electors		2,902		
Independent hold		Swing		
Independent gain from Independent		Swing		
Independent hold		Swing		

=== Maiden Newton ===
Maiden Newton
Party	Candidate	Votes	%	±%
Independent	H. Haward *	497	67.0	N/A
Alliance	N. Patmore	245	33.0	N/A
Majority		252	34.0	N/A
Turnout			73.4	N/A
Registered electors		1,011		
Independent hold				

=== Netherbury ===
Netherbury
Party	Candidate	Votes	%	±%
Conservative	J. Peake	409	62.3	N/A
Independent	C. Poole *	247	37.7	N/A
Majority		162	24.6	N/A
Turnout			49.1	N/A
Registered electors		1,335		
Conservative gain from Independent				

=== Owermoigne ===
Owermoigne (2 seats)
Party	Candidate	Votes	%	±%
Alliance	P. Gill	unopposed	N/A	N/A
Independent	R. Symes *	unopposed	N/A	N/A
Registered electors		2,235		
Alliance win (new seat)				
Independent win (new seat)				

=== Piddle Valley ===
Piddle Valley
Party	Candidate	Votes	%	±%
Ind. Conservative	A. Read	unopposed	N/A	N/A
Registered electors		1,218		
Ind. Conservative gain from Independent				

=== Puddletown ===
Puddletown
Party	Candidate	Votes	%	±%
Independent	A. Bowden	440	72.4	N/A
Labour	S. Riddell	168	27.6	–5.4
Majority		272	44.8	N/A
Turnout			54.7	—20.8
Registered electors		1,111		
Independent gain from Independent		Swing		

=== Queen Thorne ===
Queen Thorne
Party	Candidate	Votes	%	±%
Independent	J. Brewer *	unopposed	N/A	N/A
Registered electors		1,139		
Independent hold				

=== Sherborne East ===
Sherborne East (2 seats)
Party	Candidate	Votes	%	±%
Independent	E. Dyke *	unopposed	N/A	N/A
Independent	K. Luxmoore	unopposed	N/A	N/A
Registered electors		2,634		
Independent win (new seat)				
Independent win (new seat)				

=== Sherborne West ===
Sherborne West (3 seats)
Party	Candidate	Votes	%	±%
Independent	E. King *	927	–	N/A
Conservative	S. Waddington	792	32.4	N/A
Conservative	P. Jenkins	766	–	
Alliance	S. Somerville	728	29.8	N/A
Turnout			60.7	N/A
Registered electors		4,031		
Independent win (new seat)				
Conservative win (new seat)				
Conservative win (new seat)				

=== Symondsbury ===
Symondsbury
Party	Candidate	Votes	%	±%
Conservative	G. Summers *	360	66.5	N/A
Alliance	B. Wheeler	181	33.5	N/A
Majority		179	33.0	N/A
Turnout			42.3	N/A
Registered electors		1,278		
Conservative gain from Independent				

=== Thorncombe ===
Thorncombe
Party	Candidate	Votes	%	±%
Independent	P. Atyeo *	unopposed	N/A	N/A
Registered electors		1,038		
Independent hold				

=== Tolpuddle ===
Tolpuddle
Party	Candidate	Votes	%	±%
Independent	M. Kraft *	333	80.4	N/A
Alliance	J. Hallett	81	19.6	N/A
Majority		252	60.8	N/A
Turnout			54.7	N/A
Registered electors		757		
Independent hold				

=== Whitchurch Canonicorum ===
Whitchurch Canonicorum
Party	Candidate	Votes	%	±%
Conservative	C. Gibson	445	82.3	N/A
Alliance	P. Lathey	96	17.7	N/A
Majority		349	64.6	N/A
Turnout			46.8	N/A
Registered electors		1,157		
Conservative gain from Independent				

=== Winterborne St Martin ===
Winterborne St Martin
Party	Candidate	Votes	%	±%
Independent	S. Slade *	512	70.9	+2.6
Conservative	T. Shorter	210	29.1	N/A
Majority		302	41.8	N/A
Turnout			40.8	–42.5
Registered electors		1,771		
Independent hold		Swing		

=== Yetminster ===
Yetminster
Party	Candidate	Votes	%	±%
Conservative	W. Anderson *	unopposed	N/A	N/A
Registered electors		1,204		
Conservative hold				
