= West Dorset =

Former non-metropolitan district in England

Coordinates: 50.79°N 2.60°W

West Dorset District
- Non-metropolitan district
- Coat of arms

- West Dorset shown within Dorset
- Sovereign state: United Kingdom
- Constituent country: England
- Region: South West England
- Non-metropolitan county: Dorset
- Status: Abolished
- Admin HQ: Dorchester
- Incorporated: 1 April 1974

Government
  - Type: Non-metropolitan district council
  - Body: West Dorset District Council
  - Leadership: Leader & Cabinet ( )

Area
  - Total: 417.6 sq mi (1,081.5 km^{2})

Population (2017)
  - Total: 102,100
  - Density: 244.5/sq mi (94.41/km^{2})
  - Ethnicity: 98.7% White
- Time zone: UTC0 (GMT)
  - Summer (DST): UTC+1 (BST)
- ONS code: 19UH (ONS); E07000052 (GSS)
- OS grid reference: SY5785299047
- Website: www.dorsetforyou.gov.uk

West Dorset was a local government district in Dorset, England. The district was formed on 1 April 1974 under the Local Government Act 1972, and was a merger of the boroughs of Bridport, Dorchester and Lyme Regis, along with Sherborne urban district and the rural districts of Beaminster, Bridport, Dorchester and Sherborne. Its council was based in Dorchester.

The district and its council were abolished on 1 April 2019 and, together with the other four districts outside the greater Bournemouth area, replaced by a new Dorset unitary authority.

== Demography ==
At the 2001 census, West Dorset registered a population of 92,350. The population structure reflected the rural nature of the district. The area was a popular retirement area which also exported young people due to the lack of career options. This was reflected in the age structure, with 12.3% of the population over 75, compared to 7.5% in the whole of England; 51.7% were between 15 and 59, compared to 59.1% in England. 34.4% of dwellings were pensioner households, compared to 23.8% in England.

The district was an example of the low ethnic minority populations in rural areas, with 96.7% white British ethnicity, compared to 87.0% in England.

The district had a high level of car ownership, at 83.1% of households compared to 73.2% in England.

== Westminster constituencies ==
Almost all of the West Dorset area fell within the West Dorset constituency; a small part was in South Dorset.

== Settlements ==
The main settlements in West Dorset were Dorchester, Sherborne and Bridport. Dorchester, in the south of the district, is the county town of Dorset and has been an important settlement since Roman times. Sherborne, in the north, is an important market town which was, for a time, the capital of Wessex. Bridport, in the west, is popular with tourists visiting the Jurassic Coast, as is the smaller coastal town of Lyme Regis at the county border with Devon.

Settlements with a population over 2,500 are in bold.

- Abbotsbury, Allington, Alton Pancras, Askerwell
- Batcombe, **Beaminster**, Beer Hackett, Bettiscombe, Bincombe, Bishops Caundle, Bothenhampton, Bradford Abbas, Bradford Peverell, Bradpole, **Bridport**, Broadoak, Broadwindsor, Buckland Newton, Burstock, Burton Bradstock
- Castleton, Cattistock, Caundle Marsh, Cerne Abbas, Charminster, Charmouth, Chedington, Cheselbourne, Chetnole, **Chickerell**, Chideock, Chilfrome, Clifton Maybank, Compton Valence, Corscombe, Crossways
- Dewlish, **Dorchester**
- Evershot
- Fleet, Folke, Frampton, Frome St Quintin, Frome Vauchurch
- Godmanstone
- Halstock, Hermitage, Hilfield, Holnest, Holwell, Hooke
- Langton Herring, Leigh, Lillington, Littlebredy, Litton Cheney, Loders, Long Bredy, Longburton, **Lyme Regis**
- Maiden Newton, Marshwood, Melbury Bubb, Melbury Osmond, Melcombe Horsey, Minterne Magna, Mosterton
- Netherbury, Nether Compton
- Oborne, Osmington, Over Compton, Owermoigne
- Piddlehinton, Piddletrenthide, Portesham, Poundbury, Powerstock, Poyntington, Puddletown, Puncknowle, Purse Caundle, Pymore
- Rampisham, Ryme Intrinseca
- Sandford Orcas, Seaborough, **Sherborne**, Shipton Gorge, South Perrott, Stanton St Gabriel, Stinsford, Stoke Abbott, Stratton, Swyre, Sydling St Nicholas, Symondsbury
- Thorncombe, Thornford, Tincleton, Toller Porcorum, Tolpuddle, Trent
- Warmwell, West Bexington, West Knighton, West Stafford, Whitchurch Canonicorum, Winterborne Monkton, Winterborne St Martin, Winterbourne Abbas, Winterbourne Steepleton, Woodbridge, Woodsford, Wootton Fitzpaine, Wraxall
- Yetminster

== Places of interest ==
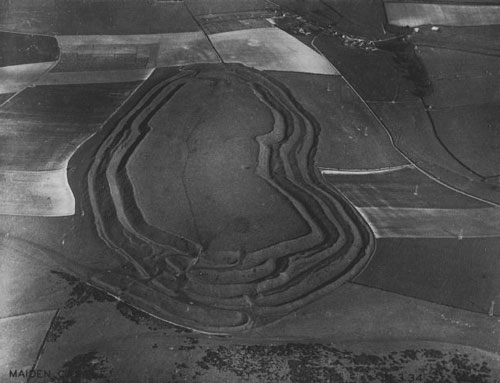
Maiden Castle in 1934: photograph by Major George W. G. Allen (1891–1940)

- Abbotsbury Castle
- Abbotsbury Swannery
- Athelhampton House
- Chesil Beach
- Dorset Downs
- Eggardon Hill
- Golden Cap
- Hooke Court
- Jurassic Coast
- Kingston Russell
- Maiden Castle
- Pilsdon Pen
- Poundbury Hill
- Rampisham Down
- River Brit
- River Frome
- River Simene
- Sherborne Abbey
- Sherborne Castle
- Sherborne House
- The Tolpuddle Martyrs Museum

== See also ==
- History of Dorset
- Geology of Dorset
- List of churches in West Dorset
- West Dorset District Council elections
