= Gwenyth Yarker =

British Art Historian and Curator

Gwenyth Yarker BEM FSA

Academic work
- Discipline: Fine Art
- Institutions: Dorset County Museum

Gwenyth Anne Yarker BEM FSA FRHistS is a British art historian and curator.

== Curatorial career ==
Yarker began her curatorial career following undergraduate study at the Open University and postgraduate research at the Courtauld Institute of Art.

Yarker became honorary curator of Fine Art at the Dorset County Museum in the 1990s. She was also curator of art at the National Maritime Museum and collections manager of the Russell-Cotes Art Gallery & Museum. In 2011 she curated a major exhibition of British portraits, "Georgian Faces: Portrait of a County". She is also a trustee of the Dorset Natural History and Archaeological Society, which is associated with the museum.

Yarker is a Fellow of the Royal Historical Society. She was elected as a Fellow of the Society of Antiquaries of London on 11 November 2005.

In the 2013 New Year Honours list she was awarded the British Empire Medal for services to museums. This was presented to her in May 2013 by Valerie Pitt-Rivers, the Lord Lieutenant of Dorset.

== Select publications ==
- Down, P., Stich, R. and Yarker, G. 2014. Dorset Woman at War : Mabel Stobart and the retreat from Serbia 1915. Dorchester, Dorset Natural History & Archaeological Society.
- Yarker, G. 2013. Inquisitive eyes: slade painters in Edwardian Wessex. Bristol, Sansom & Co.
- Yarker, G. 2010. Georgian faces : portrait of a county. Dorchester, Dorset Natural History & Archaeological Society.
- Yarker, G. 2008. "Three Rackett family portraits by George Romney", Transactions of the Romney Society. 4-15.
