= 2022 Stretford and Urmston by-election =

2022 UK by-election

- 15 December 2022
- Turnout: 25.8% (▼43.6 pp)
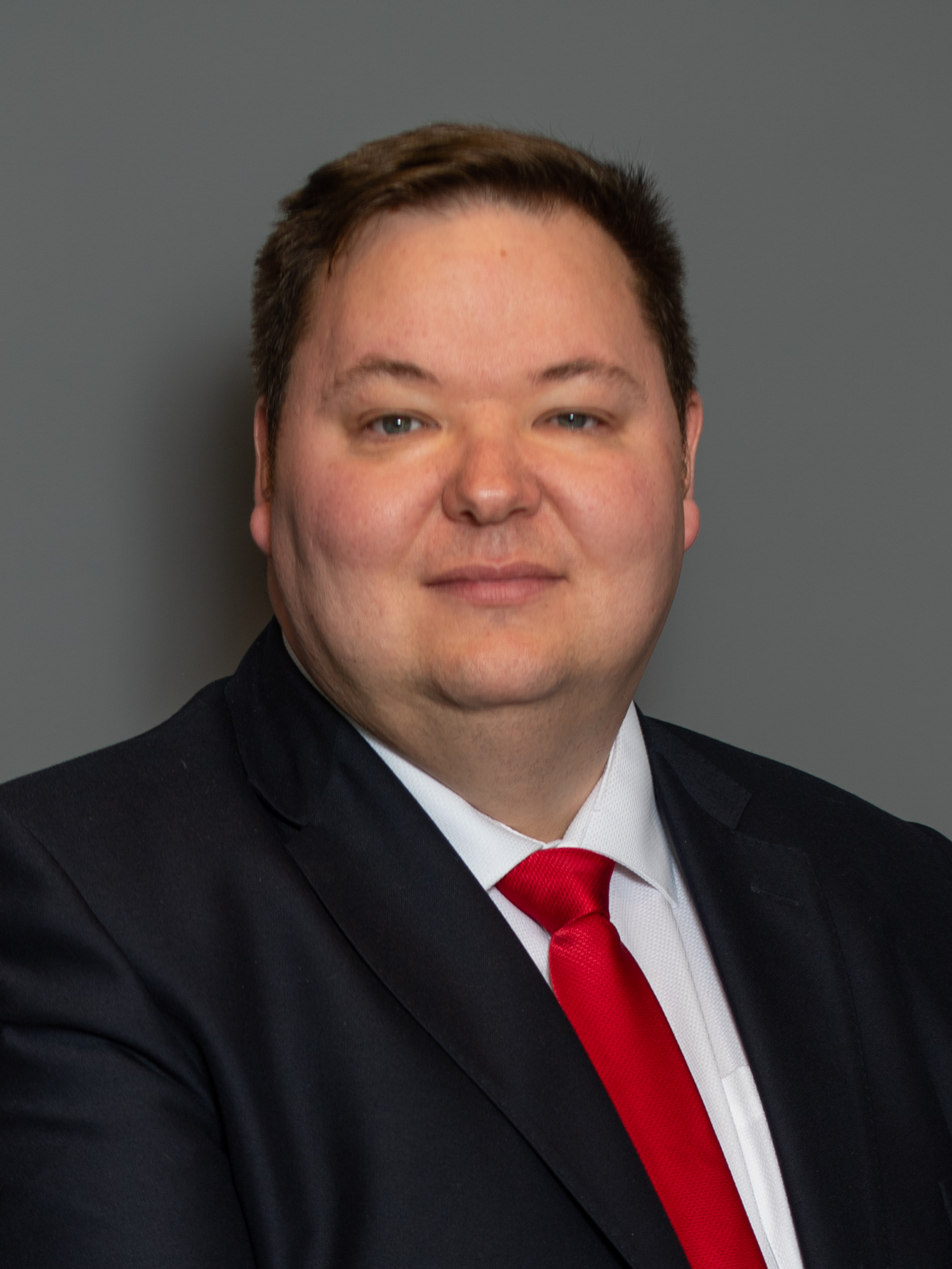
	First party	Second party
		Con
Candidate	Andrew Western	Emily Carter-Kandola
Party	Labour	Conservative
Last election	60.3%	27.5%
Popular vote	12,828	2,922
Percentage	69.6%	15.9%
Swing	▲9.3 pp	▼11.6 pp
Member of Parliament before election
Kate Green
Labour
Elected Member of Parliament
Andrew Western
Labour

A by-election for the United Kingdom parliamentary constituency of Stretford and Urmston was held on 15 December 2022, following the resignation of incumbent Labour Party MP Kate Green in order to become Deputy Mayor of Greater Manchester. The by-election was won by Andrew Western, retaining the seat for Labour with an increased share of the vote.

== Background ==
The Stretford and Urmston constituency covers a suburban industrial area in the Borough of Trafford in southern Greater Manchester. The constituency stretches from Manchester United's Old Trafford football ground and the cricket ground of the same name just outside Manchester city centre, to the south-west town of Partington. The Manchester Ship Canal forms the entire northern boundary of the seat. The population of the constituency is based around the seat's namesakes, the towns of Stretford and Urmston. Other areas include Davyhulme, Dumplington, Flixton, Gorse Hill and Wharfside. Major employers include the Shell works at Carrington and the Trafford Park industrial estate. Also in the constituency is the Trafford Centre shopping complex.

Stretford and Urmston was first fought at the 1997 general election, and has been represented by the Labour Party since its creation. The constituency was formed from large parts of the former constituency of Davyhulme, whose last member was the Conservative Winston Churchill. Its first MP was Beverley Hughes, who stood down at the 2010 general election and Kate Green was then elected. On 6 May 2017, Hughes was appointed Deputy Mayor for Policing and Crime by Greater Manchester Combined Authority Mayor Andy Burnham. Hughes resigned from the role in November 2022, with Green chosen to replace her. Green was appointed as Steward and Bailiff of the Manor of Northstead on 10 November, giving effect to her resignation as a member of Parliament and triggering a by-election.

== Candidates ==
The successful Labour Party candidate for the by-election was Andrew Western, who had been leader of Trafford Council since 2018.

The Conservative Party candidate was political consultant Emily Carter-Kandola.

The Liberal Democrats candidate was Anna Fryer, a senior mental health doctor at Trafford General Hospital.

The Green Party candidate was Dan Jerrome, a local councillor for Altrincham on Trafford Council.

The Reform UK candidate was Paul Swansborough, who previously stood as UKIP candidate in the 2017 general election in Redditch.

== Result ==
Bar chart of the election result.

2022 Stretford and Urmston by-election
Party	Candidate	Votes	%	±%
Labour	Andrew Western	12,828	69.6	+9.3
Conservative	Emily Carter-Kandola	2,922	15.9	–11.6
Green	Dan Jerrome	789	4.3	+1.6
Liberal Democrats	Anna Fryer	659	3.6	–2.3
Reform	Paul Swansborough	650	3.5	0.0
Rejoin EU	Jim Newell	237	1.3	New
Independent	Hazel Gibb	183	1.0	New
Freedom Alliance	Christina Glancy	76	0.4	New
SDP	Julien Yvon	74	0.4	New
Majority		9,906	53.8	+21.0
Total valid votes		18,418		
Rejected ballots		57		
Turnout		18,475	25.8	–43.6
Registered electors		71,641		
Labour hold		Swing	+10.5	

== Previous result ==
General election 2019: Stretford and Urmston
Party	Candidate	Votes	%	±%
Labour	Kate Green	30,195	60.3	–6.5
Conservative	Mussadak Mirza	13,778	27.5	0.0
Liberal Democrats	Anna Fryer	2,969	5.9	+3.9
Brexit Party	Gary Powell	1,768	3.5	New
Green	Jane Leicester	1,357	2.7	+1.4
Majority		16,417	32.8	–6.5
Turnout		50,067	69.4	–0.6
Labour hold		Swing	–3.3	

== Reaction ==
Labour achieved their highest vote share in the seat's history. The election turnout was reportedly affected by below freezing weather conditions and postal workers strikes. After the result, political scientist John Curtice said "Labour are now in a stronger position than they have been at any point since ... 2010."
