= 1976 West Dorset District Council election =

1976 UK local government election

← 1973	7 May 1976	1979 →

All 55 seats to West Dorset District Council 28 seats needed for a majority
	First party	Second party	Third party
	Ind	Lib	Lab
Party	Independent	Liberal	Labour
Last election	44 seats, 60.2%	9 seats, 23.9%	2 seats, 15.9%
Seats won	45	7	1
Seat change	▲1	▼2	▼1
Popular vote	17,669	9,030	2,962
Percentage	56.9%	29.1%	9.5%
Swing	▼3.3%	▼5.2%	▼6.4%
	Fourth party	Fifth party
	Con	IndC
Party	Conservative	Ind. Conservative
Last election	Did not stand	Did not stand
Seats won	1	1
Seat change	▲1	▲1
Popular vote	1,178	220
Percentage	3.8%	0.7%
Swing	▲3.8%	▲0.7%
Council control before election
Independent
Council control after election
Independent

The 1976 West Dorset District Council election was held on Thursday 6 May 1976 to elect councillors to West Dorset District Council in England. It took place on the same day as other district council elections in the United Kingdom. This was the second election to the district council.

The 1976 election saw the Independent councillors maintain their majority control on the Council.

== Ward results ==
=== Beaminster ===
Beaminster (2 seats)
Party	Candidate	Votes	%	±%
Independent	R. Bugler *	unopposed	N/A	N/A
Independent	A. Hudson *	unopposed	N/A	N/A
Registered electors		2,265		
Independent hold				
Independent hold				

=== Bothenhampton ===
Bothenhampton
Party	Candidate	Votes	%	±%
Independent	Y. Skyrme	501	67.2	N/A
Liberal	B. Hammond	245	32.8	N/A
Majority		256	34.4	N/A
Turnout			55.8	N/A
Registered electors		1,347		
Independent gain from Independent				

=== Bradford Abbas ===
Bradford Abbas
Party	Candidate	Votes	%	±%
Independent	E. Garrett	499	69.0	N/A
Liberal	M. Winder *	224	31.0	–19.9
Majority		275	38.0	N/A
Turnout			59.5	+17.1
Registered electors		1,239		
Independent gain from Liberal		Swing		

=== Bradpole ===
Bradpole
Party	Candidate	Votes	%	±%
Independent	R. Coatsworth	332	48.7	N/A
Independent	E. Kingsnorth	214	31.4	N/A
Labour	B. Cole	136	19.9	N/A
Majority		118	17.3	N/A
Turnout			53.1	N/A
Registered electors		1,291		
Independent gain from Liberal				

=== Bridport ===
Bridport (5 seats)
Party	Candidate	Votes	%	±%
Independent	P. Norfolk *	1,140	–	N/A
Independent	C. Samways	1,057	–	N/A
Liberal	A. Tiltman *	1,018	34.0	+6.7
Labour	L. Dibden *	834	27.9	+1.6
Independent	W. Hicks	829	–	N/A
Labour	H. Skevington *	816	–	N/A
Turnout			40.2	–19.4
Registered electors		5,142		
Independent hold		Swing		
Independent gain from Independent		Swing		
Liberal hold		Swing		
Labour hold		Swing		
Independent gain from Labour		Swing		

=== Broadmayne ===
Broadmayne
Party	Candidate	Votes	%	±%
Liberal	B. Course	261	54.6	N/A
Independent	W. White *	217	45.4	–10.7
Majority		44	9.2	N/A
Turnout			43.4	+12.6
Registered electors		1,123		
Liberal gain from Independent		Swing		

=== Broadwindsor ===
Broadwindsor
Party	Candidate	Votes	%	±%
Independent	C. Coate *	unopposed	N/A	N/A
Registered electors		970		
Independent hold				

=== Burton Bradstock ===
Burton Bradstock
Party	Candidate	Votes	%	±%
Independent	G. Cheney *	unopposed	N/A	N/A
Registered electors		1,063		
Independent hold				

=== Caundle Vale ===
Caundle Vale
Party	Candidate	Votes	%	±%
Independent	N. White *	unopposed	N/A	N/A
Registered electors		984		
Independent hold				

=== Cerne Valley ===
Cerne Valley
Party	Candidate	Votes	%	±%
Independent	Dione Digby, Lady Digby	426	69.4	N/A
Independent	T. Mills	188	30.6	N/A
Majority		238	38.8	N/A
Turnout			63.4	N/A
Registered electors		968		
Independent gain from Independent				

=== Charminster ===
Charminster
Party	Candidate	Votes	%	±%
Independent	E. Hanford *	392	72.7	N/A
Liberal	R. Goucher	147	27.3	N/A
Majority		245	45.4	N/A
Turnout			43.2	N/A
Registered electors		1,256		
Independent hold				

=== Charmouth ===
Charmouth
Party	Candidate	Votes	%	±%
Independent	W. McLellan	unopposed	N/A	N/A
Registered electors		1,171		
Independent gain from Independent				

=== Chesil Bank ===
Chesil Bank
Party	Candidate	Votes	%	±%
Independent	M. Pengelly *	unopposed	N/A	N/A
Registered electors		1,056		
Independent hold				

=== Chickerell ===
Chickerell (2 seats)
Party	Candidate	Votes	%	±%
Independent	L. Bennett *	unopposed	N/A	N/A
Independent	W. McCarthy *	unopposed	N/A	N/A
Registered electors		2,618		
Independent hold				
Independent hold				

=== Dorchester Central ===
Dorchester Central
Party	Candidate	Votes	%	±%
Independent	L. Phillips *	unopposed	N/A	N/A
Registered electors		1,058		
Independent hold				

=== Dorchester East ===
Dorchester East (4 seats)
Party	Candidate	Votes	%	±%
Independent	J. Parsons *	1,251	–	
Independent	R. Collins *	1,191	–	
Conservative	P. Seaton	1,178	34.3	N/A
Liberal	Enid Stella Jones *	1,004	29.2	–3.6
Liberal	D. Smith	923	–	
Liberal	R. Brissenden *	894	–	
Independent	C. Worth	846	–	N/A
Turnout			50.6	–17.7
Registered electors		4,239		
Independent hold		Swing		
Independent hold		Swing		
Conservative gain from Liberal		Swing		
Liberal hold		Swing		

=== Dorchester West ===
Dorchester West (5 seats)
Party	Candidate	Votes	%	±%
Independent	G. Powell *	1,304	–	
Independent	H. Durrant *	1,146	–	
Liberal	David Trevor Jones *	1,110	36.8	+2.9
Independent	C. Lucas	1,105	–	N/A
Liberal	E. Boothman	1,018	–	
Liberal	B. Clay	992	–	
Liberal	J. Sellingham	865	–	
Labour	G. Standfield	604	20.0	–3.6
Labour	P. Gregory	572	–	
Turnout			47.2	–24.0
Registered electors		5,098		
Independent hold		Swing		
Independent hold		Swing		
Liberal hold		Swing		
Independent gain from Liberal		Swing		
Liberal hold		Swing		

=== Frome Valley ===
Frome Valley
Party	Candidate	Votes	%	±%
Independent	B. Bryant *	unopposed	N/A	N/A
Registered electors		971		
Independent hold				

=== Halstock ===
Halstock
Party	Candidate	Votes	%	±%
Independent	T. Frost *	unopposed	N/A	N/A
Registered electors		1,115		
Independent hold				

=== Holnest ===
Holnest
Party	Candidate	Votes	%	±%
Independent	M. Cockburn *	unopposed	N/A	N/A
Registered electors		1,085		
Independent hold				

=== Loders ===
Loders
Party	Candidate	Votes	%	±%
Independent	E. Golding *	unopposed	N/A	N/A
Registered electors		894		
Independent hold				

=== Lyme Regis ===
Lyme Regis (3 seats)
Party	Candidate	Votes	%	±%
Independent	J. Nuttall	1,006	–	N/A
Independent	J. Broom *	891	–	
Independent	E. Hallett *	791	–	
Independent	V. Homyer *	506	–	
Turnout			52.7	+30.0
Registered electors		2,808		
Independent gain from Independent		Swing		
Independent hold		Swing		
Independent hold		Swing		

=== Maiden Newton ===
Maiden Newton
Party	Candidate	Votes	%	±%
Independent	H. Haward *	unopposed	N/A	N/A
Registered electors		1,008		
Independent hold				

=== Netherbury ===
Netherbury
Party	Candidate	Votes	%	±%
Independent	C. Poole	unopposed	N/A	N/A
Registered electors		1,248		
Independent gain from Independent				

=== Owermoigne ===
Owermoigne
Party	Candidate	Votes	%	±%
Independent	R. Symes	unopposed	N/A	N/A
Registered electors		1,070		
Independent gain from Independent				

=== Piddle Valley ===
Piddle Valley
Party	Candidate	Votes	%	±%
Independent	C. Green *	385	63.2	–26.4
Independent	M. Walker	224	36.8	N/A
Majority		161	26.4	–13.7
Turnout			57.2	+17.1
Registered electors		1,064		
Independent hold		Swing		

=== Puddletown ===
Puddletown
Party	Candidate	Votes	%	±%
Independent	M. Bown *	355	81.6	N/A
Independent	M. Fermor	80	18.4	N/A
Majority		275	63.2	N/A
Turnout			51.1	N/A
Registered electors		870		
Independent hold				

=== Queen Thorne ===
Queen Thorne
Party	Candidate	Votes	%	±%
Independent	J. Brewer *	unopposed	N/A	N/A
Registered electors		1,033		
Independent hold				

=== Sherborne ===
Sherborne (5 seats)
Party	Candidate	Votes	%	±%
Independent	E. King *	unopposed	N/A	N/A
Independent	E. Dyke *	unopposed	N/A	N/A
Liberal	J. Charles	unopposed	N/A	N/A
Liberal	M. Matson *	unopposed	N/A	N/A
Independent	R. Farrant *	unopposed	N/A	N/A
Registered electors		5,692		
Independent hold				
Independent hold				
Liberal hold				
Liberal gain from Independent				
Independent hold				

=== Stinsford ===
Stinsford
Party	Candidate	Votes	%	±%
Independent	L. Coleman	291	77.4	N/A
Independent	I. Birchenhough	85	22.6	N/A
Majority		206	54.8	N/A
Turnout			46.6	–18.1
Registered electors		809		
Independent gain from Independent				

=== Symondsbury ===
Symondsbury
Party	Candidate	Votes	%	±%
Independent	G. Summers	unopposed	N/A	N/A
Registered electors		1,182		
Independent gain from Independent				

=== Thorncombe ===
Thorncombe
Party	Candidate	Votes	%	±%
Independent	P. Atyeo *	unopposed	N/A	N/A
Registered electors		1,020		
Independent hold				

=== Tolpuddle ===
Tolpuddle
Party	Candidate	Votes	%	±%
Independent	M. Kraft *	314	78.9	N/A
Liberal	P. Noble	84	21.1	N/A
Majority		230	57.8	N/A
Turnout			56.5	N/A
Registered electors		705		
Independent hold				

=== Whitchurch Canonicorum ===
Whitchurch Canonicorum
Party	Candidate	Votes	%	±%
Independent	W. Fowell *	unopposed	N/A	N/A
Registered electors		1,069		
Independent hold				

=== Winterborne St Martin ===
Winterborne St Martin
Party	Candidate	Votes	%	±%
Independent	S. Slade	unopposed	N/A	N/A
Registered electors		946		
Independent gain from Independent				

=== Yetminster ===
Yetminster
Party	Candidate	Votes	%	±%
Ind. Conservative	W. Anderson	348	61.3	N/A
Independent	F. Lawrence *	220	38.7	N/A
Majority		128	22.6	N/A
Turnout			51.7	N/A
Registered electors		1,113		
Ind. Conservative gain from Independent				
