= Stretford and Urmston =

UK Parliament constituency (since 1997)

Coordinates: 53°27′N 2°20′W

- Borough constituency for the House of Commons
- Interactive map of boundaries since 2010
- Location within North West England
- County: Greater Manchester
- Electorate: 73,212 (March 2020)
- Major settlements: Stretford, Urmston, Davyhulme, Partington

Current constituency
- Created: 1997
- Member of Parliament: Andrew Western (Labour)
- Seats: One
- Created from: Davyhulme, Stretford

Stretford and Urmston is a constituency (Note: A borough constituency (for the purposes of election expenses and type of returning officer)) in Greater Manchester represented in the House of Commons of the UK Parliament since a 2022 by-election by Andrew Western, a Labour MP.

== Constituency profile ==
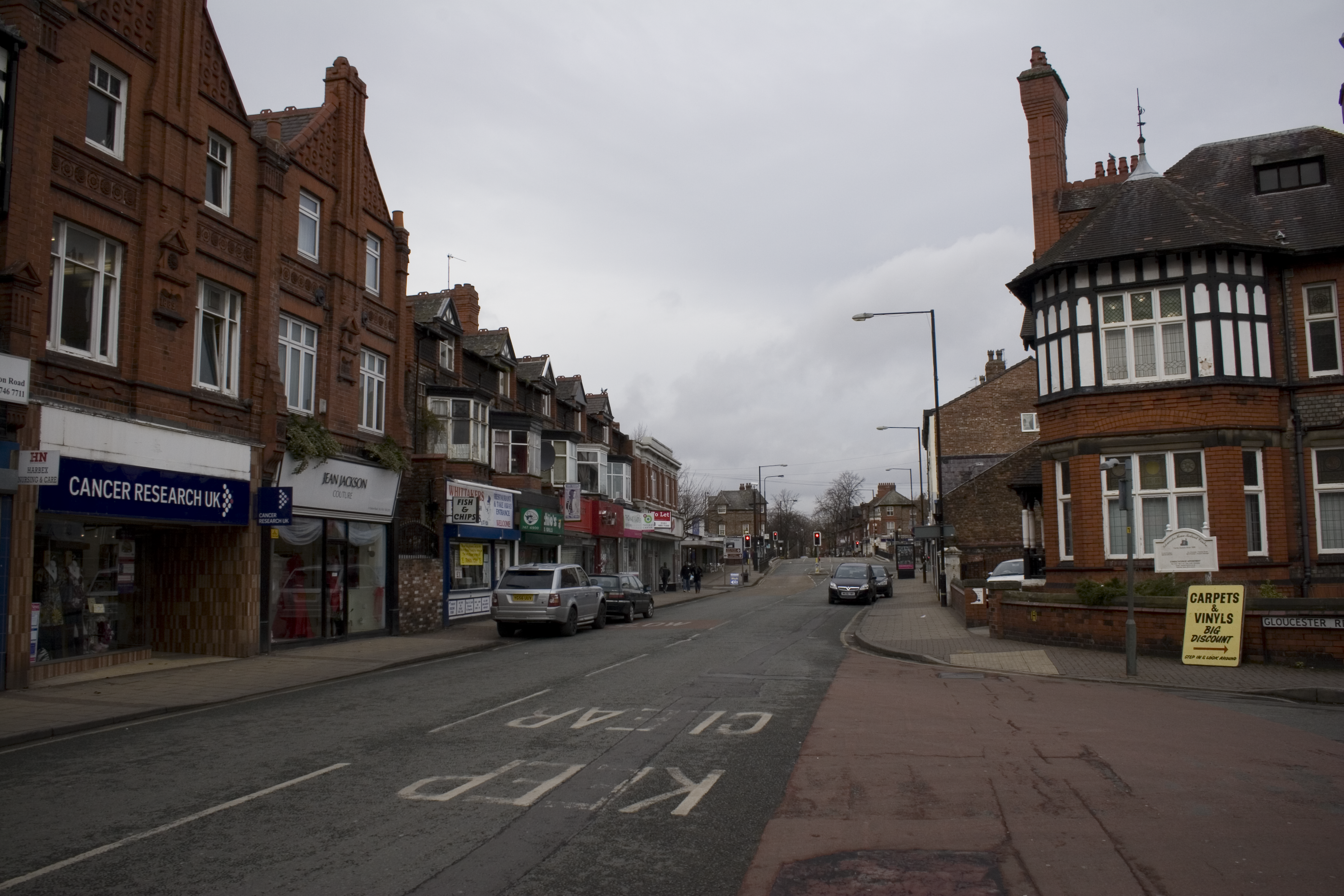
Station Road, Urmston

Stretford and Urmston is a constituency in Greater Manchester in North West England, within the borough of Trafford. It covers the towns of Stretford, Urmston and Partington and the area of Old Trafford.

This constituency covers outlying towns to the south-west of Manchester. A large portion of the constituency is taken up by Trafford Park, once one of the largest industrial estates in the world and a major centre for aircraft production during World War II. The development of Trafford Park caused rapid suburban growth in Stretford and Urmston, which were traditionally small, agricultural villages. The Trafford Centre, built in 1998, is one of the largest retail and leisure complexes in the country. Old Trafford is known for hosting the football stadium of the same name, home to Manchester United F.C, and the Old Trafford Cricket Ground, home to Lancashire County Cricket Club.

The constituency has average levels of wealth overall; Urmston is mostly affluent and suburban, particularly in the neighbourhoods of Flixton and Davyhulme, however there is some deprivation in Old Trafford and Partington. Old Trafford is more urban in character with most residents living in dense flats and terraces, whilst Partington was mostly developed as a low-income overspill estate with many properties being socially rented. House prices across the constituency are generally higher than the rest of North West England but lower than the UK average.

Stretford and Urmston has an above-average proportion of middle-aged adults and a low retired population. Residents have average levels of income, homeownership, child poverty, education and unemployment. A high proportion work in the retail, business administration and arts sectors. White people made up 74% of the population at the 2021 census. Asians—mostly of Pakistani origin—were the largest ethnic minority group at 14%, and Black people were 6%. Asians made up around a third of the population in Old Trafford.

At the local borough council, almost all seats in this constituency are represented by the Labour Party, although at the most recent election in 2026 some Green Party and Reform UK councillors were elected in Old Trafford and Partington, respectively. An estimated 54% of voters in Stretford and Urmston supported remaining in the European Union in the 2016 referendum, higher than the UK-wide figure of 48%.

== History ==
Stretford and Urmston was created in 1997 from significant parts of the former constituencies of Davyhulme – a Conservative-held marginal whose last member was the Conservative Winston Churchill (grandson of the former Prime Minister) – and safely Labour Stretford, whose last member was Tony Lloyd (Labour).

The constituency was first represented by Beverley Hughes, who stood down at the 2010 general election. Kate Green, a Labour front-bencher, held the seat from 2010 until she resigned in November 2022 after being nominated as Greater Manchester's deputy mayor for policing and crime, taking over from Beverley Hughes once again.

The Conservatives are traditionally strongest in the affluent suburbs of Davyhulme and Flixton, whereas Urmston is often a marginal battle between them and Labour. But in the 2018 and 2019 Local Elections, Labour won every ward in the constituency for the first time ever, gaining Flixton and both Davyhulme wards. These were crucial seats in terms of giving them control of Trafford Council in May 2019. The rest of the wards, which include Stretford and its suburbs, and the areas of Carrington and Partington (Bucklow-St Martins) are strongly Labour.

As to other parties, the Liberal Democrats and UKIP were the only parties to have achieved the retention of deposit threshold of 5% of the vote until 2024, when candidates for Reform UK, the Workers Party, and the Green Party all passed it.

== Boundaries ==
=== Historic ===
1997–2010: The Metropolitan Borough of Trafford wards of Bucklow, Clifford, Davyhulme East, Davyhulme West, Flixton, Longford, Park, Stretford, Talbot, and Urmston.

2010–2023: The Metropolitan Borough of Trafford wards of Bucklow-St. Martins, Clifford, Davyhulme East, Davyhulme West, Flixton, Gorse Hill, Longford, Stretford, and Urmston.

=== Current ===
Following a local government boundary review which came into effect in May 2023, the constituency now comprises the following wards of Metropolitan Borough of Trafford:

- Bucklow-St. Martins; Davyhulme; Flixton; Gorse Hill & Cornbrook; Longford; Lostock & Barton; Old Trafford; Stretford & Humphrey Park; Urmston.

The 2023 review of Westminster constituencies, which was based on the ward structure in place at 1 December 2020, left the boundaries unchanged.

== Members of Parliament ==
Election	Member	Party
1997	Beverley Hughes	Labour
2010	Kate Green	Labour
2022 by-election	Andrew Western	Labour

== Elections ==
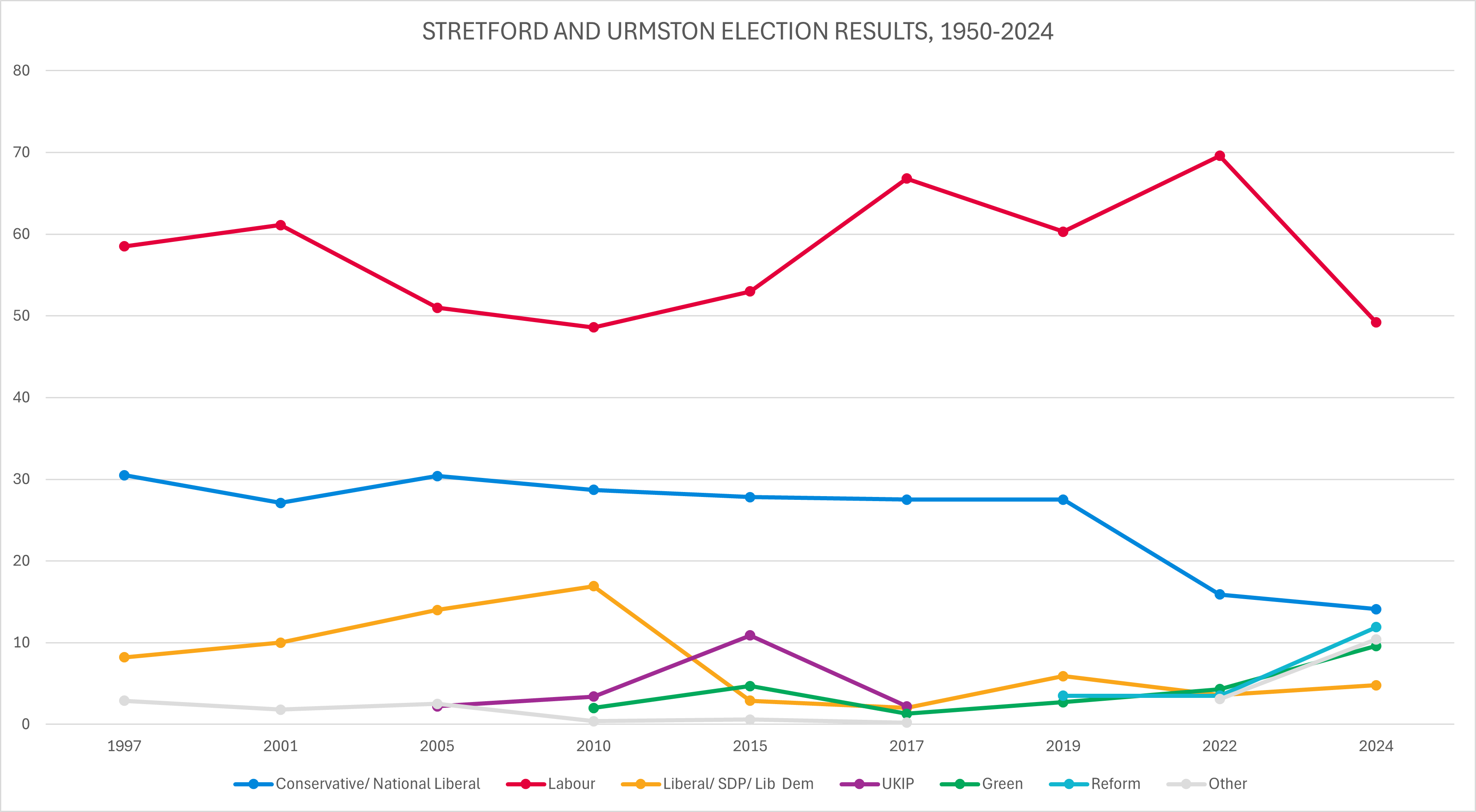
Election results 1997-2024

=== Elections in the 2020s ===
General election 2024: Stretford and Urmston
Party	Candidate	Votes	%	±%
Labour	Andrew Western	22,642	49.2	−11.1
Conservative	Mark Cornes	6,492	14.1	−13.4
Reform	Charlotte Faulkner	5,485	11.9	+8.4
Workers Party	Khalila Chaudry	4,461	9.7	N/A
Green	Dan Jerrome	4,398	9.6	+6.9
Liberal Democrats	Mark Clayton	2,216	4.8	+1.1
Rejoin EU	Jim Newell	308	0.7	N/A
Majority		16,150	35.1	+2.3
Turnout		46,002	61.2	−8.0
Registered electors		75,153		
Labour hold		Swing	+1.1	

Changes in vote share from the 2019 general election*

By-election 2022: Stretford and Urmston
Party	Candidate	Votes	%	±%
Labour	Andrew Western	12,828	69.6	+9.3
Conservative	Emily Carter-Kandola	2,922	15.9	–11.7
Green	Dan Jerrome	789	4.3	+1.6
Liberal Democrats	Anna Fryer	659	3.6	–2.4
Reform	Paul Swansborough	650	3.5	N/A
Rejoin EU	Jim Newell	237	1.3	N/A
Independent	Hazel Gibb	183	1.0	N/A
Freedom Alliance	Christina Glancy	76	0.4	N/A
SDP	Julien Yvon	74	0.4	N/A
Majority		9,906	53.7	+21.0
Turnout		18,418	25.8	–43.6
Labour hold		Swing	+10.5	

=== Elections in the 2010s ===
General election 2019: Stretford and Urmston
Party	Candidate	Votes	%	±%
Labour	Kate Green	30,195	60.3	–6.5
Conservative	Mussadak Mirza	13,778	27.5	±0.0
Liberal Democrats	Anna Fryer	2,969	5.9	+3.9
Brexit Party	Gary Powell	1,768	3.5	N/A
Green	Jane Leicester	1,357	2.7	+1.4
Majority		16,417	32.8	–6.5
Turnout		50,067	69.4	–0.6
Labour hold		Swing	–3.3	

General election 2017: Stretford and Urmston
Party	Candidate	Votes	%	±%
Labour	Kate Green	33,519	66.8	+13.8
Conservative	Lisa Cooke	13,814	27.5	–0.3
UKIP	Andrew Beaumont	1,094	2.2	–8.7
Liberal Democrats	Anna Fryer	1,001	2.0	–0.9
Green	Michael Ingleson	641	1.3	–3.4
CPA	Rose Doman	122	0.2	N/A
Majority		19,705	39.3	+14.1
Turnout		50,191	70.0	+3.2
Labour hold		Swing	+7.0	

General election 2015: Stretford and Urmston
Party	Candidate	Votes	%	±%
Labour	Kate Green	24,601	53.0	+4.4
Conservative	Lisa Cooke	12,916	27.8	–0.9
UKIP	Kalvin Chapman	5,068	10.9	+7.5
Green	Geraldine Coggins	2,187	4.7	+2.7
Liberal Democrats	Louise Ankers	1,362	2.9	–14.0
Whig	Paul Bradley-Law	169	0.4	N/A
Population Party UK	Paul Carson	83	0.2	N/A
Majority		11,685	25.2	+5.3
Turnout		46,386	66.8	+2.7
Labour hold		Swing	+2.6	

General election 2010: Stretford and Urmston
Party	Candidate	Votes	%	±%
Labour	Kate Green	21,821	48.6	–2.4
Conservative	Alex Williams	12,886	28.7	–1.7
Liberal Democrats	Stephen Cook	7,601	16.9	+2.9
UKIP	David Owen	1,508	3.4	+1.2
Green	Margaret Westbrook	916	2.0	N/A
Christian	Samuel Jacob	178	0.4	N/A
Majority		8,935	19.9	–0.7
Turnout		44,910	64.1	+2.6
Labour hold		Swing	–0.7	

=== Elections in the 2000s ===
General election 2005: Stretford and Urmston
Party	Candidate	Votes	%	±%
Labour	Beverley Hughes	19,417	51.0	–10.1
Conservative	Damian Hinds	11,566	30.4	+3.3
Liberal Democrats	Faraz Bhatti	5,323	14.0	+4.0
Respect	Mark Krantz	950	2.5	N/A
UKIP	Michael McManus	845	2.2	N/A
Majority		7,851	20.6	–13.4
Turnout		38,101	61.5	+6.7
Labour hold		Swing	–6.7	

General election 2001: Stretford and Urmston
Party	Candidate	Votes	%	±%
Labour	Beverley Hughes	23,836	61.1	+2.6
Conservative	Jonathan D. Mackie	10,565	27.1	–3.4
Liberal Democrats	John R. Bridges	3,891	10.0	+1.8
Independent	Katie Price	713	1.8	N/A
Majority		13,271	34.0	+6.0
Turnout		39,005	54.8	–14.9
Labour hold		Swing		

=== Elections in the 1990s ===
General election 1997: Stretford and Urmston
Party	Candidate	Votes	%	±%
Labour	Beverley Hughes	28,480	58.5	
Conservative	John Gregory	14,840	30.5	
Liberal Democrats	John R. Bridges	3,978	8.2	
Referendum	Caroline Dore	1,397	2.9	
Majority		13,640	28.0	
Turnout		48,695	69.7	
Labour win (new seat)				

== See also ==
- List of parliamentary constituencies in Greater Manchester
