= Edward Digby, 12th Baron Digby =

British peer and British Army (Coldstream Guards) officer

The Right Honourable The Lord Digby KCVO JP DL

Member of the House of Lords¨
- Lord Temporal
- In office 29 January 1964 – 11 November 1999 as a hereditary peer
- Preceded by: The 11th Baron Digby
- Succeeded by: Seat abolished (Note: Pursuant to the House of Lords Act 1999.)

Personal details
- Born: Edward Henry Kenelm Digby; 24 July 1924
- Died: 1 April 2018 (aged 93)
- Spouse: Dione Sherbrooke (m. 1952)
- Children: 3
- Parent: Edward Digby, 11th Baron Digby (father)
- Relatives: Pamela Beryl Digby (sister)
- Education: Eton College; Trinity College, Oxford

Edward Henry Kenelm Digby, 12th Baron Digby (24 July 1924 – 1 April 2018), also 6th Baron Digby in the Peerage of Great Britain, was a British peer and British Army (Coldstream Guards) officer.

== Early life ==
He was the son of the Edward Digby, 11th Baron Digby. He studied at Eton and Trinity College, Oxford, and trained at the Royal Military Academy Sandhurst.

== Career ==
During World War II, he served as an army officer with the British Army of the Rhine. As a cadet, he received an emergency commission as a second lieutenant on 15 February 1945, relinquished this commission on 22 May 1946 and received a regular commission in the Coldstream Guards from the same date.

Digby succeeded his father as Baron Digby in 1964. The House of Lords Act 1999 removed the right of hereditary peers to sit in the House of Lords. He served as Lord Lieutenant of Dorset from 1984 to 1999 and was appointed Knight Commander of the Royal Victorian Order in the 1999 New Year Honours.

== Personal life ==
In 1952, he married Dione Sherbrooke (b. 1934), daughter of Rear-Adm. Robert Sherbrooke and the former Rosemary Neville Buckley. They had two sons and a daughter:

- Henry Noel Kenelm Digby, 13th Baron Digby (b. 1954), who married Susan E. Watts, eldest daughter of Peter Watts, in 1980; they divorced in 2001.
- Hon. Rupert Simon Digby (b. 1956), who married Charlotte Fleury Hirst, second daughter of Robert Hirst, in 1986.
- Hon. Zara Jane Digby (b. 1958), who married, as his second wife, James Edward Caulfeild Percy, second son of Henry Edward Percy (a grandson of Henry Percy, 7th Duke of Northumberland), in 1993.

He died on 1 April 2018 at the age of 93.

== Coat of arms ==
Coat of arms of Edward Digby, 12th Baron Digby
Crest An ostrich, holding in the beak a horseshoe all proper. Escutcheon Azure, a fleur-de-lis argent Supporters On either side a monkey proper environed about the middle and lined or. Motto DEO NON-FORTUNA (From God not chance)

== Notes ==
Peerage of Ireland
Preceded by Edward Digby	Baron Digby; 1st creation 1964–2018	Succeeded by Henry Digby
Peerage of Great Britain
Preceded by Edward Digby	Baron Digby; 2nd creation 1964–2018; Member of the House of Lords (1964–1999)	Succeeded by Henry Digby
