= 1st Dorsetshire Artillery Volunteers =

1st Dorsetshire Artillery Volunteers Dorsetshire Royal Garrison Arrillery 522nd (Dorsetshire) Coast Regiment, RA 421st (Dorset) Coast Regiment, RA
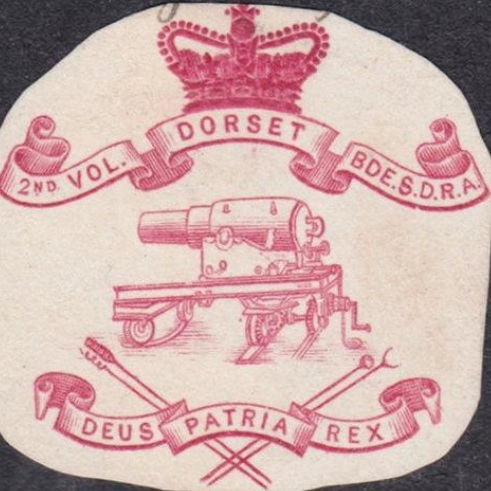
- Letterhead of the 2nd Dorset Artillery Volunteers, 1895
- Active: 29 December 1859 – 31 October 1956
- Country: United Kingdom
- Branch: Territorial Army
- Type: Artillery Corps
- Role: Garrison Artillery; Coast Artillery
- Part of: Southern Coast Defences; Portland Garrison
- Garrison/HQ: Weymouth, Dorset

The 1st Dorsetshire Artillery Volunteers and its successors were part-time coast defence units of the British Army from 1859 to 1956. Although these units saw no action, they protected the Dorset Coast, including the naval base of Portland Harbour, in both World Wars and also supplied trained gunners to siege batteries engaged on the Western Front during World War I. The unit continued in the Territorial Army after World War II.

== Volunteer Force ==
The enthusiasm for the Volunteer movement, following an invasion scare in 1859, saw the creation of many Rifle and Artillery Volunteer Corps composed of part-time soldiers eager to supplement the Regular British Army in time of need. Four Artillery Volunteer Corps (AVCs) were quickly formed in Dorsetshire:

- 1st (Lyme Regis) formed on 29 December 1859
- 2nd (Portland) formed on 14 February 1860, absorbed into 4th in November 1861
- 3rd (Bridport) formed on 8 February 1860
- 4th (Portland) formed on 20 November 1860, absorbed 2nd in November 1861

In November 1863, they were attached to the 1st Administrative Brigade, Hampshire AVCs based at Portsmouth, then transferred to the 1st Devonshire Admin Brigade at Exeter in January 1866. Two further AVCs were formed in Dorsetshire at this time:

- 5th (Charmouth) formed on 31 January 1868
- 6th (Swanage) formed on 28 April 1869

The Dorsetshire AVCs returned to the 1st Hants Admin Bde in 1873, but the 3rd (Bridport) Corps was disbanded that year. When the Volunteers were consolidated in 1880, the Dorsetshire units became part of the 1st Hants & Dorset Artillery Volunteers:

- No 15 Company at Lyme Regis – former 1st Dorset
- No 16 Company at Portland – former 4th Dorset
- No 17 Company at Portland and Swanage – former 4th and 6th Dorset
- No 18 Company at Charmouth – former 5th Dorset.

On 1 April 1886, the Dorset companies were separated to form an independent 1st Dorsetshire AVC, with eight companies and its HQ initially at Portland, moving to Weymouth by July 1886, under the command of Lieutenant-Colonel G.E. Eliot, previously the second Lt-col of the 1st Hants & Dorset. Since 1882, all the AVCs had been affiliated to one of the territorial garrison divisions of the Royal Artillery (RA), with the 1st Hants and Dorset in the Southern Division. In 1886, the 1st Dorset AVC officially became the 2nd Volunteer (Dorsetshire) Brigade, Southern Division, RA. In 1889, the corps resumed its former title and two additional batteries were formed. In January 1891, the personnel from Portland were separated into the 2nd Dorsetshire AVC, but this was absorbed back into the 1st in June 1894, giving the following organisation:

- HQ and No 7 Company at Weymouth
- Nos 1 and 2 Companies at Bournemouth
- No 3 Company at Lyme Regis
- No 4 Company at Charmouth
- No 5 Company at Swanage
- No 6 Company at Poole and Parkstone
- Nos 8–10 Companies at Portland

By 1893, the War Office Mobilisation Scheme had allocated both Dorset Artillery Volunteer units to the Weymouth fixed defences.

In 1899, the RA was divided into separate field and garrison branches, and the artillery volunteers were all assigned to the Royal Garrison Artillery (RGA). When the divisional structure was abolished, their titles were changed, the unit becoming the 1st Dorsetshire Royal Garrison Artillery (Volunteers) on 1 January 1902. It consisted of ten companies (nine by 1908) with its HQ at Lower St Alban's Street, Weymouth.

== Territorial Force ==
When the Volunteers were subsumed into the new Territorial Force (TF) under the Haldane Reforms of 1908, the unit was split up:

- Nos 1 and 2 Companies became 6th Hampshire Battery, III Wessex Brigade, Royal Field Artillery at Bournemouth
- No 4 Company became the Dorsetshire Battery III Wessex Bde, RFA, at Bridport
- The remainder of the personnel were to join the Hants & Dorset RGA, but this was changed back to separate Dorset and Hampshire units in 1910. The Dorsetshire RGA was a 'Defended Ports Unit' in Southern Coast Defences with the primary role of defending the naval base at Portland Harbour, alongside the Dorsetshire and Wiltshire Fortress Royal Engineers and three Regular RGA companies (Nos 16, 28 and 30) based at Weymouth. Together, these units were responsible for manning the following guns in the Portland defences by 1914:
- 6 × 9.2-inch guns
- 10 × 6-inch Mk guns
- 8 × 12-pdr QF guns

The Dorsetshire RGA had following organisation:

- HQ at Lower St Alban's Street, Weymouth
- No 1 Company at King's Road East, Swanage
- No 2 Company at South Road, Poole
- No 3 Company at Old Drill Hall, Easton Lane, Portland (shared with Dorsetshire and Wiltshire Fortress RE; now the Portland Sculpture Trust)

== World War I ==
=== Mobilisation ===
On the outbreak of war, the Dorsetshire RGA mobilised in Southern Coast Defences under the command of Major M.J. Raymond. Shortly afterwards, TF units were invited to volunteer for Overseas Service and, on 15 August 1914, the War Office (WO) issued instructions to separate those men who had signed up for Home Service only, and form these into reserve units. On 31 August, the formation of a reserve or 2nd Line unit was authorised for each 1st Line unit where 60 per cent or more of the men had volunteered for Overseas Service. The titles of these 2nd Line units would be the same as the original, but distinguished by a '2/' prefix. In this way, duplicate companies were created, bringing the Dorsetshire RGA up to a strength of six companies.

By October 1914, the campaign on the Western Front was bogging down into Trench warfare and there was an urgent need for batteries of Siege artillery to be sent to France. The WO decided that the TF coastal gunners were well enough trained to take over many of the duties in the coastal defences, releasing Regular RGA gunners for service in the field, and 1st line RGA companies that had volunteered for overseas service had been authorised to increase their strength by 50 per cent.

Although complete defended ports units never left the UK, they did supply drafts of trained gunners to RGA units serving overseas. They also provided cadres as the basis on which to form complete new units for front line service. 52nd Siege Battery, RGA, was formed on 30 July 1915 at Weymouth with a nucleus from the Dorsetshire RGA. Equipped with two 12-inch howitzers on railway mountings it went out to the Western Front in December 1915 and served there for the rest of the war, latterly supporting First Army. Similarly, the cadres of 123rd and 174th Siege Batteries formed in 1916 (see below) were provided by the Dorsetshire RGA, while a large number of other siege batteries formed at Portland (87th, 116th, 129th, 136th, 145th, 177th, 183rd, 209th, 216th, 241st, 277th, 285th, 305th) and Weymouth (106th, 111th, 200th, 226th, 249th, 291st, 304th) may have included trained men from the unit among the recruits, although the Army Council Instructions did not specifically order this.

Under Army Council Instruction 686 of April 1917, the coastal defence companies of the RGA (TF) were reorganised. The Dorsetshire RGA serving in the Portland garrison was reduced from six to just two companies, which were to be kept up to strength with non-TF recruits. In April 1918 the Portland Garrison comprised the following batteries (manned by the two Dorsetshire RGA companies and Nos 16, 28 and 30 Companies, RGA) under the control of No 5 Coastal Fire Command:

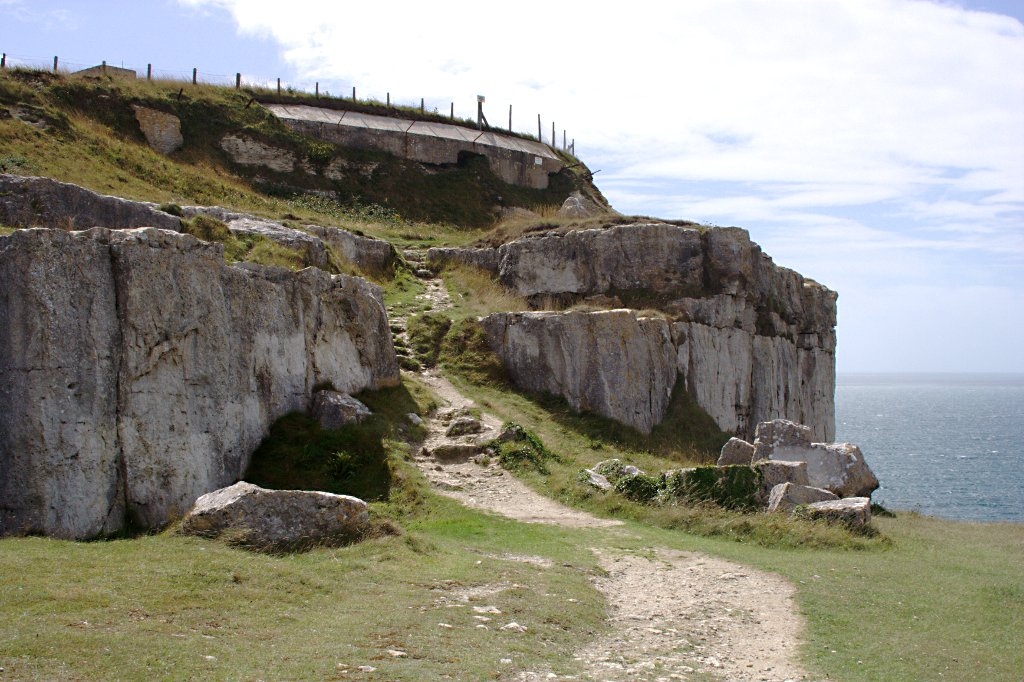
Blacknor Battery today.

- Blacknor Battery – 2 × 9.2-inch Mk X guns
- East Weare Battery – 2 × 9.2-inch Mk X
- Breakwater Fort Top – 2 × 12-pdr QF guns
- Breakwater Fort Jetty – 2 × 12-pdr QF
- New Breakwater Pier A – 2 × 12-pdr QF
- New Breakwater Pier B – 3 × 12-pdr QF
- New Breakwater Pier C – 1 × 6-inch Mk VII gun
- Upton Battery – 2 × 9.2-inch Mk X

These defences never saw action during the war.

=== 123rd Siege Battery ===
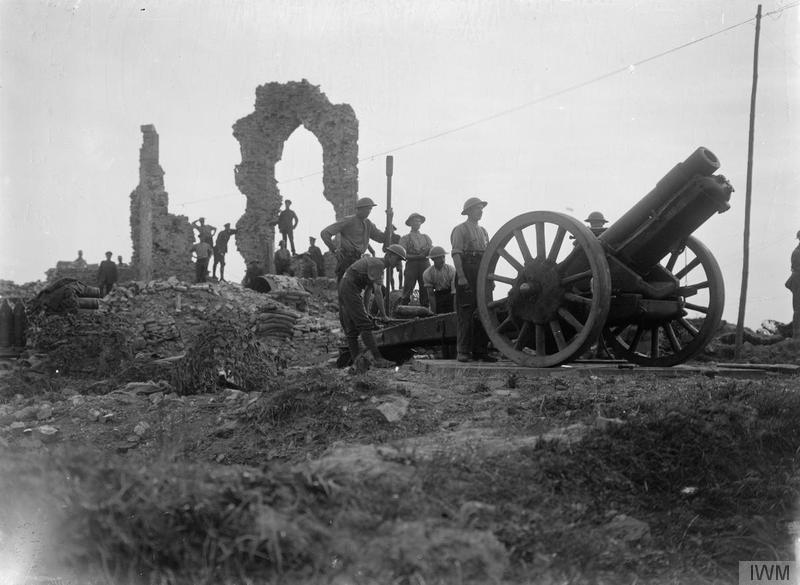
6-inch howitzer and crew.

123rd Siege Battery, RGA, was raised at Portland on 22 March 1916 under Army Council Instruction 701 of 31 March 1916 with a cadre of 3 officers and 78 other ranks from the Dorsetshire RGA. It went out to the Western Front on 18 July 1916, manning four 6-inch howitzers, and joined Third Army. Third Army was not engaged in any major operations during the second half of 1916, so this was a relatively quiet sector of the front. 123rd Siege Bty was assigned to 47th Heavy Artillery Group (HAG) but the policy was to transfer siege batteries from one HAG to another as the situation demanded, and 123rd regularly switched between 8th and 46th HAGs with Third Army during the winter of 1916–17.

==== 1917 ====
123rd Siege Bty served with Third Army at the Battle of Arras and then in July it moved to Fifth Army, whose heavy guns were engaged in a long artillery duel with the Germans in preparation for the Third Ypres Offensive. Slowly the British got the upper hand, and a large proportion of German guns were out of action when the infantry attacked on 31 July. However, the offensive bogged down through the summer and autumn of 1917. 123rd Siege Bty was joined by a section from the newly-arrived 414th Siege Bty in August, in preparation for bringing the battery up to a strength of six 6-inch howitzers; however it does not appear that the additional guns arrived until 19 February 1918.

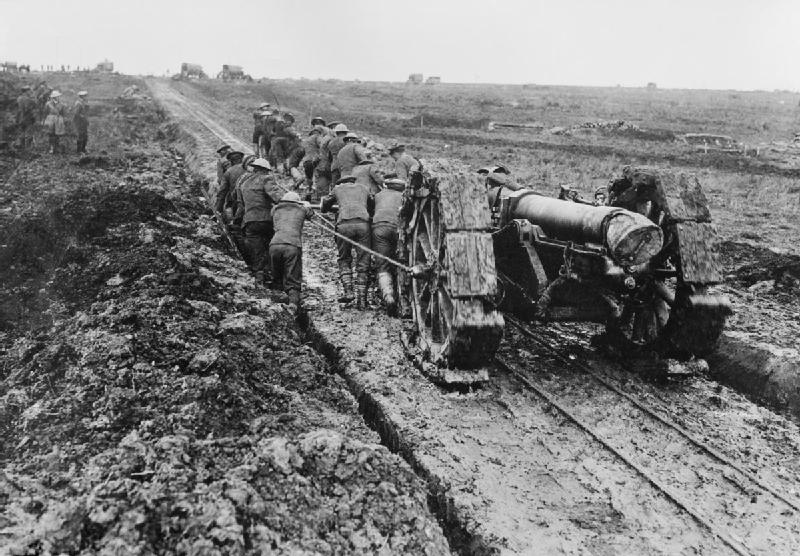
6-inch howitzer being moved through mud on the Western Front.

Second Army HQ took over the faltering offensive in September, and the battery came under its control. The Battles of the Menin Road, Polygon Wood and Broodseinde were highly successful because of the weight of artillery brought to bear on German positions. But, as the offensive continued, British batteries were clearly observable from the Passchendaele Ridge and were subjected to counter-battery (CB) fire, while their own guns sank into the mud and became difficult to aim and fire.

On 13 November, the battery was transferred to 88th HAG; by now HAG allocations were becoming more fixed and, in December, the 88th was converted into a permanent RGA brigade. 123rd Siege Bty stayed with it until the Armistice a year later. 88th Brigade and 123rd Siege Bty were with Third Army for its surprise attack with tanks at the Battle of Cambrai.

==== 1918 ====
When the German spring offensive opened on 21 March 1918, 88th Bde was ordered to move to assist the hard-pressed VI Corps. Over the next two weeks, VI Corps and Third Army fought a series of rearguard actions through the 'Great Retreat'.

88th Brigade was still with VI Corps when Third Army joined in the Allied Hundred Days Offensive at the Battle of Albert on 23 August. The artillery barrage was very good and the infantry were on their objective less than an hour after Zero. This was followed by the Battles of the Scarpe (28 August), the Drocourt-Quéant Switch Line (2 September), Épehy (18 September), the Canal du Nord (28 September) and the Second Battle of Cambrai (8 October).

The battery's last major operation was the Battle of the Selle on 20 October. By the beginning of November 88th Bde was standing by for further operations, but the enemy was retiring so rapidly that it was difficult to get heavy guns forward into range. The brigade's batteries hardly fired another shot before the Armistice with Germany came into force on 11 November.

123rd Siege Battery was disbanded in 1919.

=== 174th Siege Battery ===
174th Siege Battery, RGA, was raised at Weymouth on 13 June 1916 under Army Council Instruction 1239 of 21 June 1916 with a cadre of 3 officers and 78 other ranks from the Dorsetshire RGA. It went out to the Western Front in October 1916, equipped with four 6-inch howitzers, and soon joined Fifth Army which was engaged in the final stages of the Somme Offensive.

Like 123rd Siege Bty, 174th regularly switched between 8th and 46th HAGs during the winter of 1916–17. 174th Siege Bty took part in the Battle of Arras (see above) in April 1917.

==== 1917 ====
On 21 May 1917, 174th Siege Bty was transferred to Second Army in the Ypres Salient where a mass of guns and howitzers had been assembled for the Battle of Messines. Although this attack was characterised by the surprise explosion of 19 huge mines under the German lines at Zero hour, it was preceded by days of preliminary bombardment aimed at destroying strongpoints and the opposing artillery. This continued until 02.40 on 7 June, when the guns fell silent. Then at 03.10 the mines were exploded and the assault went in with massive artillery support.

Next, 174th Siege Bty moved to Fifth Army for the opening of the Third Ypres Offensive (see above). An even greater concentration of guns was massed than for Messines, but the circumstances were less favourable. Gun batteries were packed into the Ypres Salient where they were under observation and CB fire from the Germans on the higher ground: casualties among guns and gunners were high. 174th Siege Bty was rested from 19 August to 4 September before returning for the final attacks. After the Passchendaele fighting the battery joined 79th HAG, which became a permanent RGA brigade the following February; 174th Siege Bty remained with it until the Armistice. The battery was joined by a section from the newly-formed 448th Siege Bty on 16 February, bringing it up to a strength of six howitzers.

==== 1918 ====
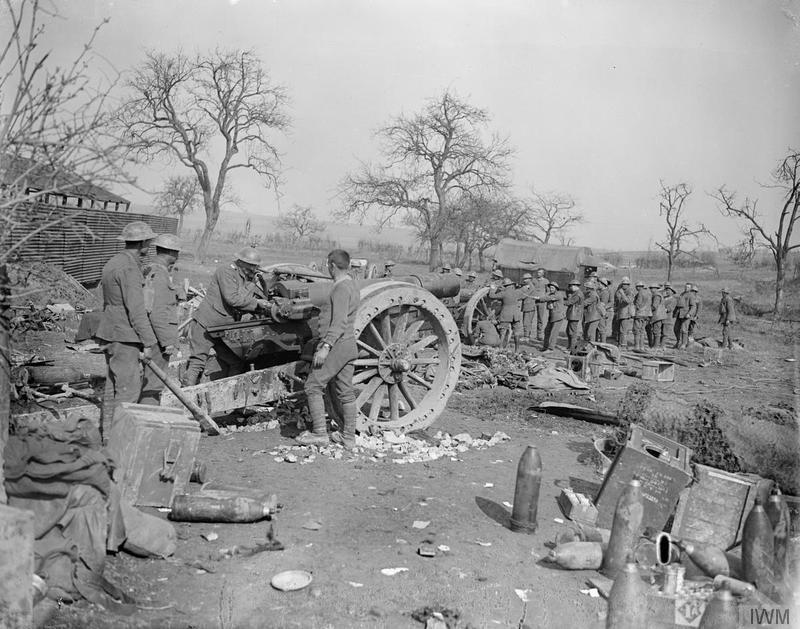
Crew checking the breech of a 6-inch howitzer during the Spring Offensive, 1918.

79th Brigade was with Second Army and was not involved in the first phase of the German Spring Offensive of 1918, but the Army was directly attacked and driven back from its positions during the following Battle of the Lys. Nevertheless the line held, and the heavy guns, often well forward, took a heavy toll of the attackers.

79th Brigade had shifted to First Army by 1 May, and on 28 June it supported XI Corps in Operation Borderland, a limited counter-attack on La Becque and other fortified farms in front of the Forest of Nieppe, in what was described as 'a model operation' for artillery cooperation.

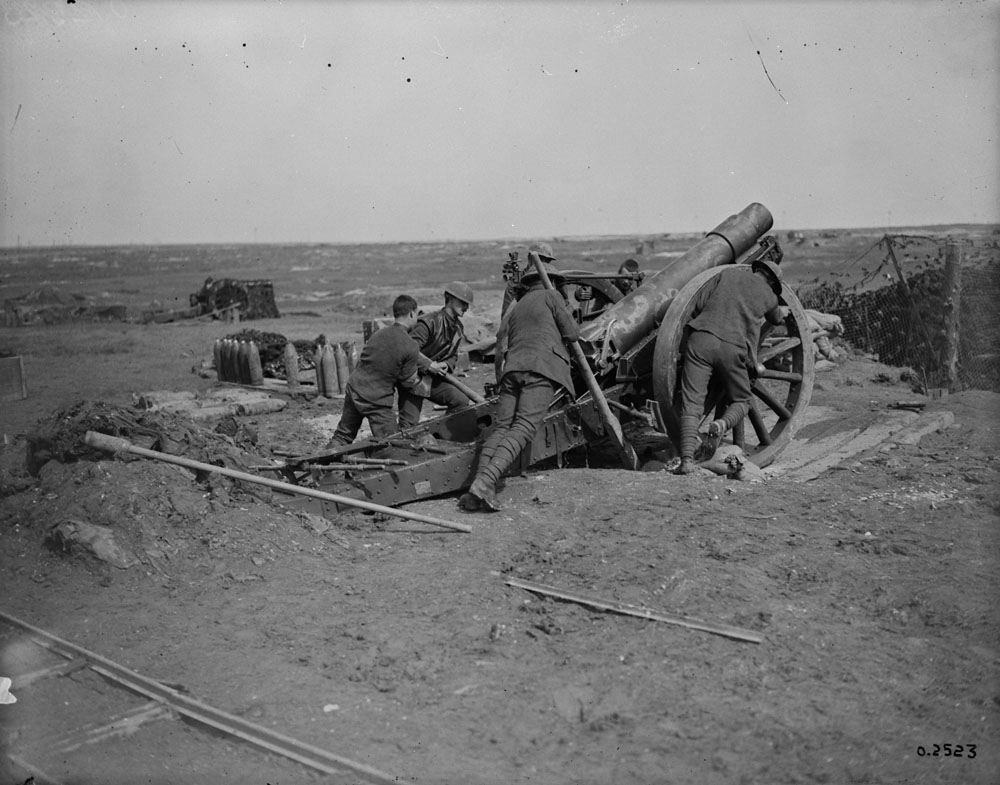
Crew positioning a 6-inch 26 cwt howitzer in 1918.

79th Brigade joined Fourth Army on 18 August, soon after the beginning of the final Hundred Days Offensive. On 29 September, IX Corps carried out an assault crossing of the St Quentin Canal, with 79th Bde amongst the mass of artillery supporting the operation. The heavy guns continued firing on the canal banks until the last possible moment as 137th (Staffordshire) Brigade stormed the outpost line and then scrambled across the canal in the morning mist. IX Corps continued to attack, at the Beaurevoir Line on 8 October, and the River Selle on 17 October. The first day of the battle went well, one German counter-attack being broken up when all available guns were turned onto it. Steady progress was also made on the second and third days as Fourth Army closed up to the Sambre Canal.

IX Corps renewed its advance on 23 October, with 79th Bde part of a massive corps artillery reserve. As the regimental historian relates, 'The guns of Fourth Army demonstrated, on 23 October, the crushing effect of well co-ordinated massed artillery. they simply swept away the opposition'. After a pause to regroup and reconnoitre, IX Corps stormed across the canal on 4 November (the Battle of the Sambre). After that, the campaign became a pursuit of a beaten enemy until the Armistice, in which the slow-moving siege guns could play no part.

174th Siege Battery was disbanded in 1919.

== Interwar ==
The Dorsetshire RGA was placed in suspended animation after demobilisation in 1919. It reformed in 1920 at Weymouth with one battery from the former HQ and one from the former No 3 Company. When the TF was reconstituted as the Territorial Army (TA) in 1921, the unit was renamed the Dorsetshire Coast Brigade, RGA, and the batteries were numbered 179 and 180. Then, when the RGA was subsumed into the Royal Artillery in 1924, the unit became the Dorsetshire Heavy Brigade, RA. In 1926, it was decided that the coast defences of the UK would be manned by the TA alone. When the RA updated its unit designations from 'brigade' to 'regiment', the Dorsetshire changed designation on 1 November 1938. It formed part of the coast defence troops in 43rd (Wessex) Divisional Area with the following organisation:

- HQ at Weymouth
- 179 Battery at Weymouth
- 180 Battery at Portland
- 186 Battery at Poole – formed in December 1936

== World War II ==
=== Mobilisation ===
On the outbreak of war, the regiment and its three batteries mobilised in the Portland Defences. The guns were controlled by Portland Fire Command at Weymouth and companies of the Dorsetshire Fortress Royal Engineers manned searchlights for coast and anti-aircraft defence.

With the danger of invasion after the British Expeditionary Force was evacuated from Dunkirk, the coastal artillery regiments underwent a major reorganisation in the summer of 1940. On 1 July, the Dorsetshire Heavy Regiment was redesignated 522nd (Dorsetshire) Coast Regiment and reorganised as six batteries, designated A to F. A number of emergency batteries of ex-Royal Navy guns were obtained for the South Coast ports, including two 6-inch Mk XII naval guns manned by the army, ordered for Poole Harbour on 22 May. These were followed by two 4.7-inch guns ordered for Lyme Regis on 14 July. Other emergency coastal batteries (each of two 4-inch Mk VII guns) were ordered on 21 July for Abbotsbury and Swanage. On 31 December, 387 Coast Bty at Abbotsbury was incorporated into the regiment.

=== Home Defence ===
On 1 April 1941, A to F Btys were numbered 102 to 107, and on 10 May 1941, 239 Independent Coast Bty (formed on 10 March) was attached to the regiment for administration and training, stationed at West Bay, Bridport Harbour, with 2 × 5.5-inch guns and 2 × searchlights. Then, on 5 June 1941, 134 Bty from 533rd (Orkney) Coast Rgt arrived from Buchanan, Stirling, in Scotland, to join 522nd Rgt, taking over defences at Upton, Weymouth

From June 1941, 522nd Coast Rgt had the following organisation:

- 102 Coast Bty at East Weare
- 103 Coast Bty at Blacknor
- 104 Coast Bty at Breakwater
- 105 Coast Bty at Nothe Fort
- 106 Coast Bty at A, Centre and B Piers, Portland
- 107 Coast Bty at C Pier (Northern Arm), Portland
- 134 Coast Bty at Upton
- 239 Independent Coast Bty – attached for training; joined regiment August 1941
- 387 Coast Bty at Abbotsbury
- 31, 57 Coast Observer Detachments (CODs) – joined August–December 1941
- 98 COD – joined by July 1942
- No 4 Coast Artillery Plotting Room (Portland) – joined by July 1942

At their height, in September 1941, the Portland area defences contained the following guns:

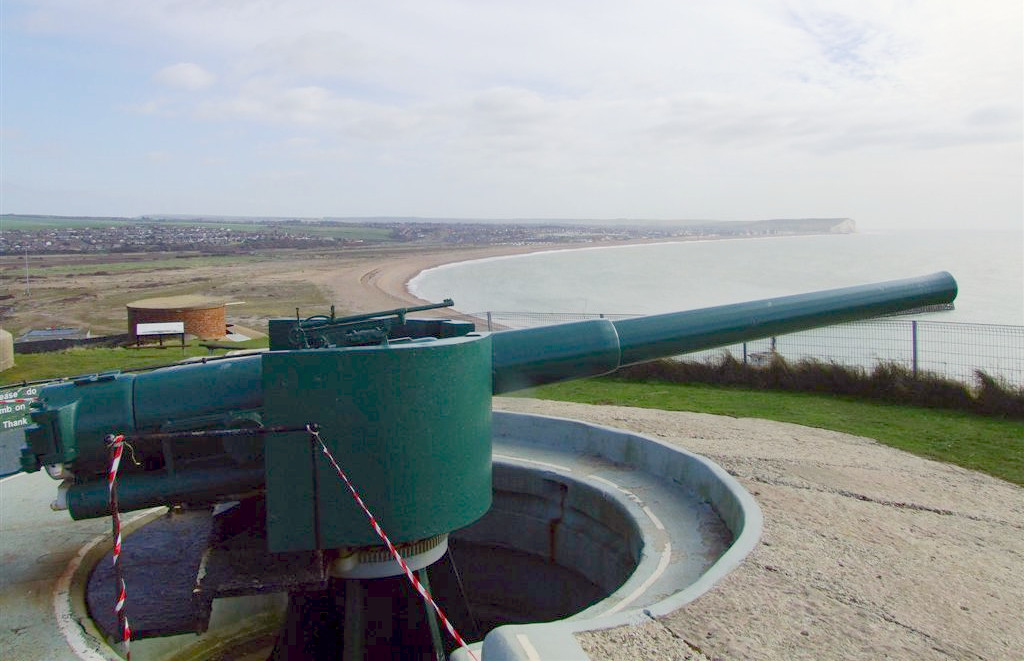
Mk VII 6-inch gun in typical coast defence emplacement, preserved at Newhaven Fort.

- Portland
  - 4 × 9.2-inch
  - 4 × 6-inch
  - 4 × 12-pounders
- Poole
  - 2 × 4.7-inch
- Lyme Regis
  - 2 × 4.7-inch
- Swanage
  - 2 × 4.7-inch
- Abbotsbury
  - 2 × 4-inch
- West Bay
  - 2 × 5.5-inch

On 20 December 1941, 239 and 387 Btys were transferred to a new 'Special Coast Rgt' (569th Coast Rgt, see bwlow), which was forming at Bridport

In April 1942, the regiment came under the command of V Corps Coast Artillery HQ, changing to Hampshire & Dorset District by October when V Corps embarked for North Africa (Operation Torch). From 7 December 1942, RHQ at Portland was included in Portland Fire Command HQ. Then Canadian Corps took over responsibility for coast defence in the area as part of South Eastern Command, until it joined 21st Army Group in June 1943 and Sussex District Coast Artillery HQ took over control of 522nd Rgt. The regiment returned to the command of Hants & Dorset District in April 1944.

=== 569th Coast Regiment ===
569th Coast Regiment was formed as a headquarters at Bridport on 12 December 1941. It took over a number of existing batteries on 20 December:

- 239 Coast Bty at West Bay, Bridport, from 522nd (Dorsetshire) Coast Rgt
- 376 Coast Bty at Lyme Regis from 555th Coast Rgt based at Honiton
- 386 Coast Bty at Swanage, formerly with 534th (Orkney) Coast Rgt; moved on to 554th Coast Rgt based at Poole
- 387 Coast Bty at Abbotsbury from 522nd (Dorsetshire) Coast Rgt
- 58 COD joined from 555th Coast Rgt in January 1942.

In 1942, the regiment was also under V Corps CA HQ and then Hants & Dorset District. 58 COD rejoined 555th Coast Rgt during the summer of that year. On 6 February 1943, 239, 376 and 387 Coast Btys joined or rejoined 522nd (Dorsetshire) Coast Rgt. 569th Coast Rgt's HQ was disbanded the following day.

=== Late war ===
As the invasion threat receded, the coast defences were seen as absorbing excessive manpower and were scaled back, the gunners being redeployed. 569th Coast Rgt had been disbanded in early 1943, and its batteries rejoined 522nd, giving the following organisation:

- 102, 103, 104, 105, 107, 134 Btys
- 106 Bty – to 534th (Orkney) Coast Rgt April 1943
- 239, 387 Btys – returned from 569 Coast Rgt 6 February 1943
- 376 Bty at Lyme Regis – from 569 Coast Rgt 6 February, began disbanding on 17 March, completing the process by 2 April
- 27 COD – replaced 31 COD
- 57, 98 CODs
- No 4 Army Plotting Room

However, Portland Harbour was a major concentration point for shipping being assembled for the Allied invasion of Normandy (Operation Overlord), and Weymouth Bay was used for invasion exercises, so 522nd Coast Rgt did not see the same reductions as regiments elsewhere. Nevertheless, by the end of 1944, serious naval attacks on the coast could be discounted and the War Office began reorganising surplus coastal units into infantry battalions for duties in the rear areas. In January 1945, most of the gun positions were reduced to 'care and maintenance', and on 15 January 1945 RHQ 522nd Coast Rgt and HQ Portland Fire Command were converted into RHQ 618th (Dorsetshire) Infantry Regiment, RA at Falmouth, leaving a few HQ details at Portland. On 28 February 1945, the remaining personnel of 102, 103, 104, 105, 107, 134, 239 and 387 Btys joined 527th (Hampshire) Coast Rgt and the HQ details of 522nd Rgt were disbanded.

As well as men transferred from the 522nd, the new infantry regiment included a draft of 130 men from 523rd (Cornwall) Coast Rgt. It does not appear to have served overseas. 618th (Dorsetshire) Rgt began to enter suspended animation on 10 January 1946, completing the process by the end of the month.

== Postwar ==
When the TA was reconstituted on 1 January 1947, the regiment was reformed at Weymouth as 421st (Dorset) Coast Regiment in 102 Coast Brigade.

In 1956, the Coast Artillery branch was abolished and, on 31 October, 421st Coast Rgt was merged with 255th (Wessex) Medium Rgt to form 255th (West Somerset Yeomanry and Dorset Garrison) Medium Rgt, with its HQ at Yeovil.

In 1961, 255th Med Rgt was amalgamated with 294th (Queen's Own Dorset Yeomanry) Medium Rgt as 250th (Queen's Own Dorset and West Somerset Yeomanry) Med Rgt, which included R (Dorset Garrison) Battery. The Dorset artillery lineage ended when the TA was reduced into the Territorial and Army Volunteer Reserve in 1967.

== Uniforms and insignia ==
The 5th and 6th Dorsetshire AVCs wore distinctive buttons marked with a crown above a field gun and a laurel spray on either side. Beneath the gun was the figure 5 or 6 and round the lower edge was the word 'DORSET'.

== Honorary colonels ==
The following served as Honorary Colonel of the unit:

- Col G.E. Eliot, former CO, appointed 9 January 1895
- Lt-Col Edward, 10th Lord Digby, late Coldstream Guards, appointed 28 November 1900
- Maj-Gen Sir Reginald Pinney, KCB, appointed 31 March 1921
- Col Edward, 11th Lord Digby, DSO, MC, late Coldstream Guards, appointed 18 December 1929 and continued post with 421st (Dorset) Coast Rgt in 1947
