= Up Cerne =

Hamlet in Dorset, England

Coordinates: 50.8234°N 2.4873°W

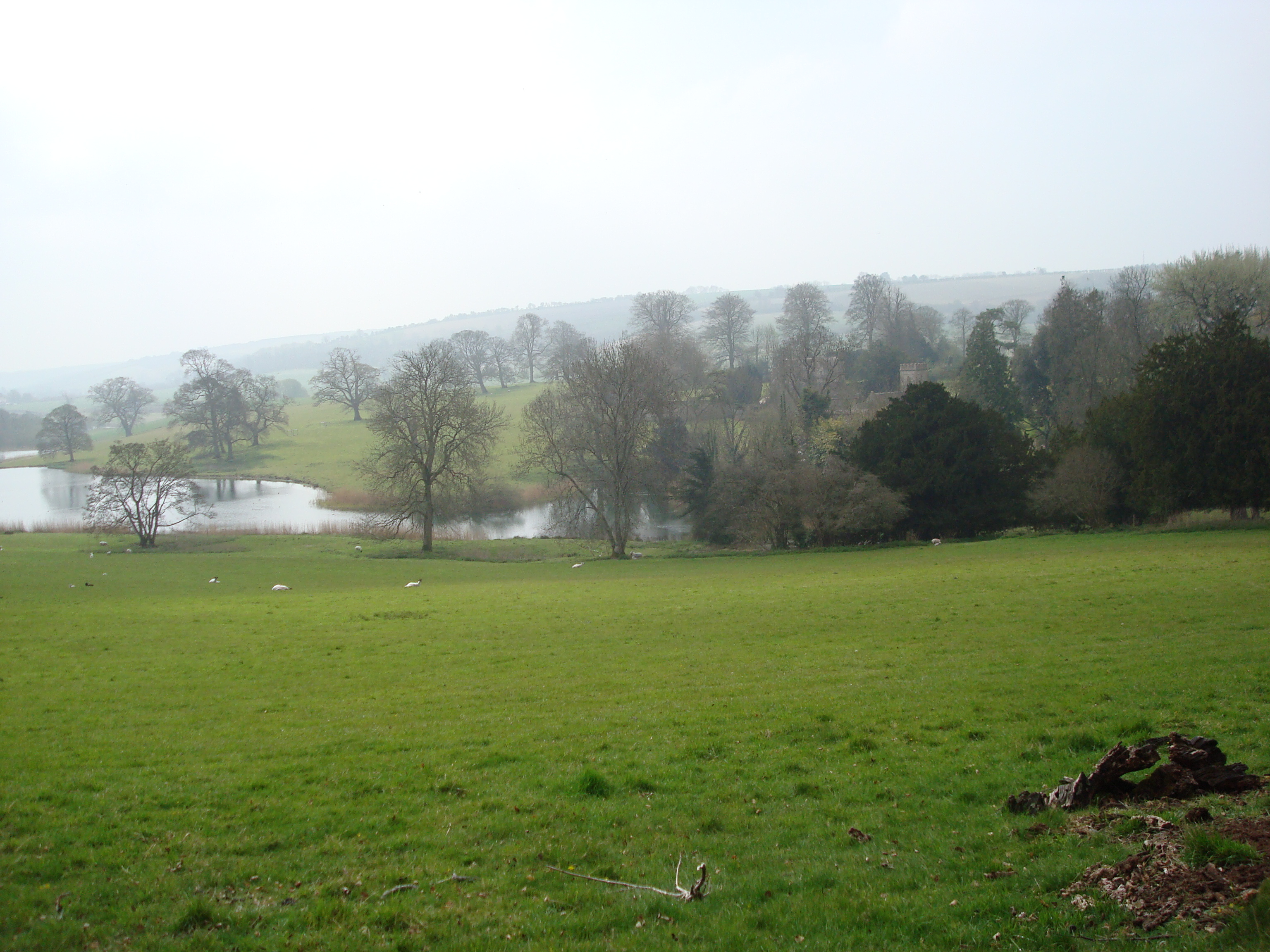
Up Cerne lies nestled within the trees

Up Cerne is a hamlet lying to the west of the River Cerne (for the meaning of the name, see River Cerne: Etymology), between Minterne Magna and Cerne Abbas in Dorset, England. It was the birthplace of John Mount Batten.

The settlement is centred around a 17th-century Up Cerne Manor but also includes a number of smaller thatched cottages. Public footpath access to the hamlet is via the Wessex Ridgeway which also forms part of the local Cerne Valley Way.
