= Winston Churchill (1940–2010) =

Grandson of Winston Churchill

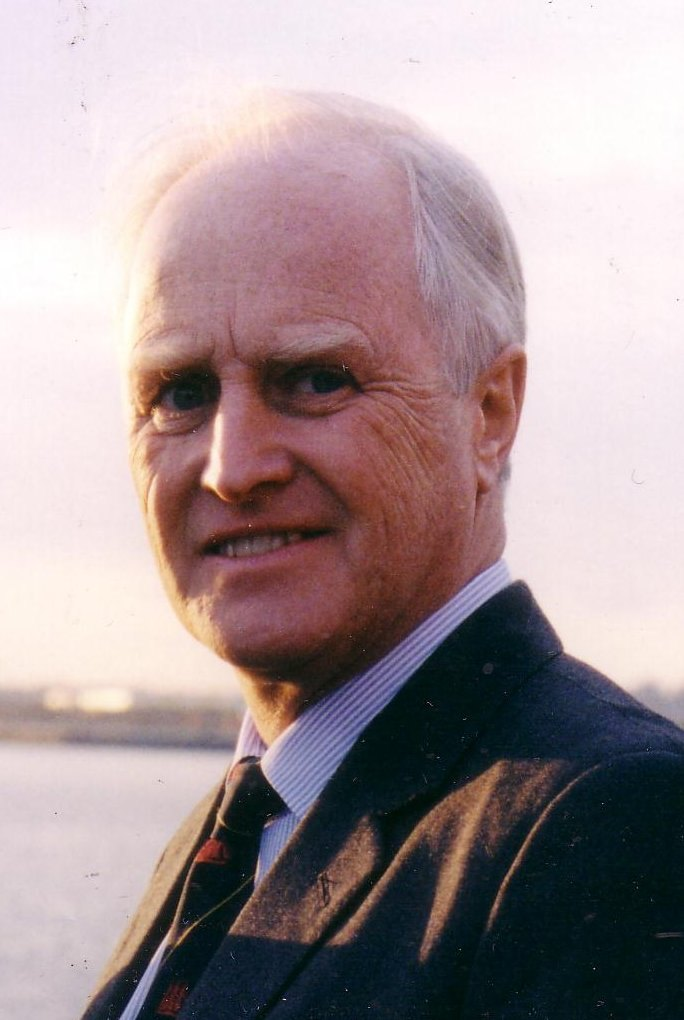
- Churchill in 1997

Member of Parliament
- In office 18 June 1970 – 8 April 1997
- Preceded by: Ernest Arthur Davies
- Succeeded by: Constituency abolished
- Constituency: Stretford (1970–1983); Davyhulme (1983–1997)

Personal details
- Born: Winston Spencer Churchill; 10 October 1940 Chequers, Buckinghamshire, England
- Died: 2 March 2010 (aged 69) Belgravia, London, England
- Resting place: St. Martin's Churchyard, Bladon, Oxfordshire, England
- Party: Conservative
- Spouses: Minnie Caroline d'Erlanger (m. 1964; dissolved 1997); Luce Engelen (m. 1997)
- Children: 4
- Parents: Randolph Churchill; Pamela Digby
- Relatives: Winston Churchill (paternal grandfather); Clementine Churchill (paternal grandmother); Arabella Churchill (paternal half-sister)
- Education: Christ Church, Oxford

Winston Spencer Churchill (10 October 1940 – 2 March 2010), generally known as Winston Churchill, (Note: Churchill's legal surname was Spencer Churchill: his ancestor George Spencer changed his name to Spencer-Churchill when he became the 5th Duke of Marlborough, but starting with his great-grandfather, Lord Randolph Churchill, his branch of the Spencer-Churchill family has used the name Churchill only in its public life.) was an English Conservative politician and a grandson of the British prime minister of the same name. During the period of his prominence as a public figure, he was normally referred to as Winston Churchill MP, in order to distinguish him from his grandfather. His father Randolph Churchill was also an MP and his mother Pamela Harriman was the United States Ambassador to France.

== Early life ==
Churchill was born on 10 October 1940 at Chequers, Buckinghamshire, England, five months after his grandfather became Prime Minister, a year into the Second World War. He was educated at Ludgrove, Eton College and at Christ Church, Oxford. His famous grandfather died in 1965, and his father died three years afterwards.

== Career as a journalist ==
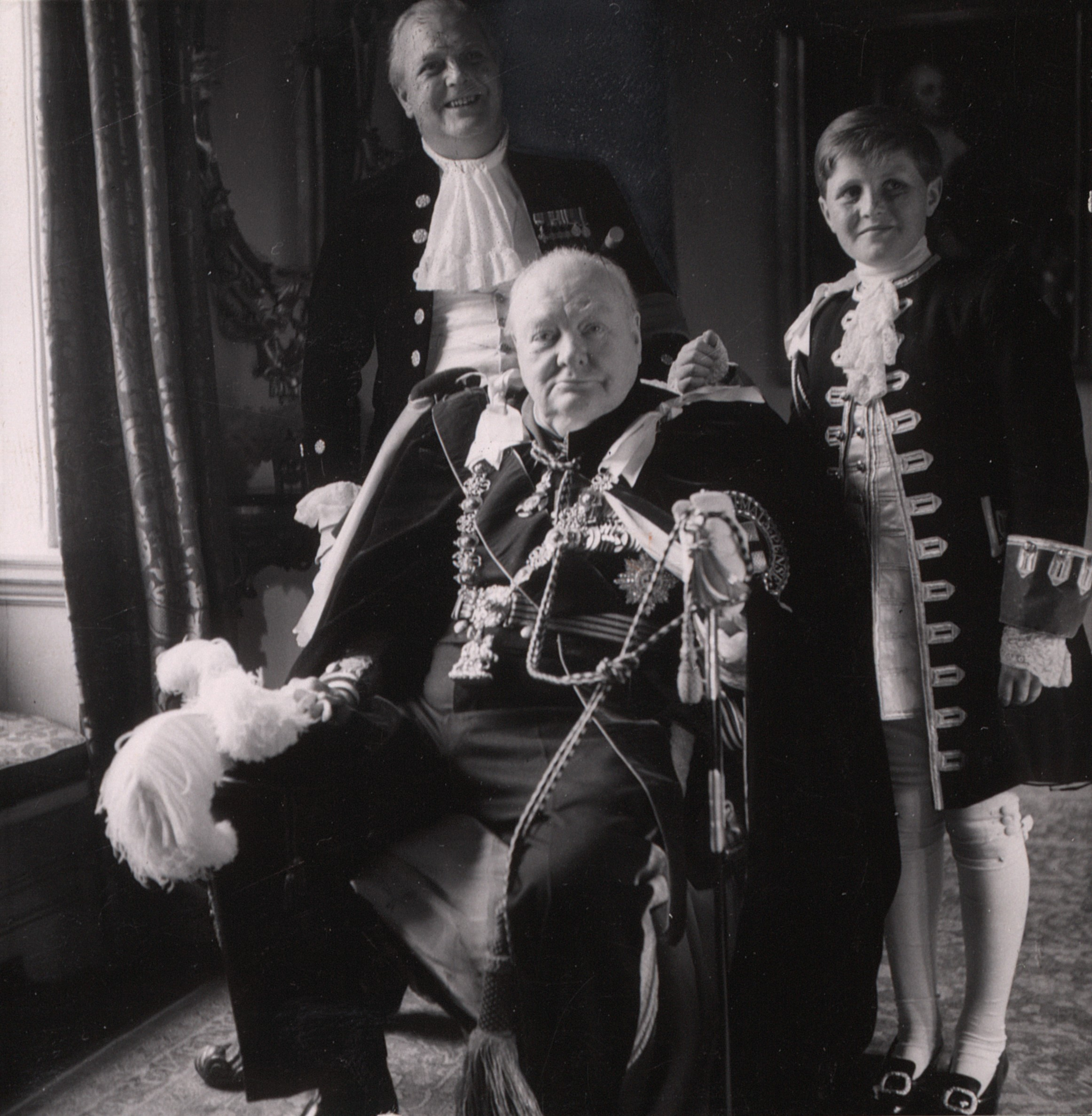
Winston (right), his father, and grandfather in the ceremonial robes of the Order of the Garter

Before becoming a Member of Parliament he was a journalist, notably in the Middle East during the Six-Day War, during which time he met numerous Israeli politicians, including Moshe Dayan. He also published a book recounting the war. During the 1960s he covered conflicts in Yemen and Borneo as well as the Vietnam War. He visited Czechoslovakia in 1968 to record the Prague Spring, and when, that same year, in the wake of public assassinations, the Democratic National Convention was held at Chicago, he was attacked by the police.

In the late 1960s at Biafra, Nigeria, he witnessed both war and famine, and the indiscriminate bombing of civilians was an outrage to him. He reported in further trouble spots including Communist China, and in Portugal during the Carnation Revolution. Like other members of his family, he began a lecture tour of the United States.

In 1965, he became a member of the Pennsylvania Society of the Sons of the American Revolution.

== Political career ==
Churchill was not able to take up his grandfather's parliamentary seat at Woodford in Essex when he stepped down at the 1964 general election, three months before his death at the age of 90. However, he was at the centre of the Conservative campaign: despite being quite inexperienced in politics, he had been appointed as Edward Heath's personal assistant. Heath, who was already a senior cabinet minister, was elected party leader the following year after the resignation of Sir Alec Douglas-Home, who lost the general election to Harold Wilson's Labour Party.

Churchill's first attempt to enter Parliament was at the 1967 Manchester Gorton by-election. In spite of the unpopularity of the incumbent Labour government, he lost, but only by 577 votes. He was still a journalist with The Daily Telegraph when his father died in 1968; the paper's proprietor, Lord Hartwell, took the decision to employ Martin Gilbert to continue the work on the former Prime Minister's biography that Randolph had started.

Churchill became Member of Parliament for the constituency of Stretford, near Manchester, at the 1970 general election. As an MP he was a member of the parliamentary ski team and chairman of the Commons Flying Club. He became a friend of Julian Amery MP, who as Minister for Housing and Construction at the Department of the Environment, appointed him his Parliamentary Private Secretary. Churchill was not much interested in the mundane questions of housing, however, and doing as little as possible, took questions to the House from civil servants. Transferred to the Foreign Office with Amery, he became very outspoken on issues in the Middle East and on the Communist Bloc. After he attempted to question Alec Douglas-Home's abilities as Foreign Secretary, he was forced to resign in November 1973, just over three months before the Conservatives lost power to the Labour Party for the second time in a decade.

Churchill resumed his great-grandfather Lord Randolph Churchill's precedent of protecting Ulster Unionism, defending the Diplock Courts, internment and arguing for the death penalty for terrorists. He was part of a group of Conservative MPs of the era (including Margaret Thatcher) who were heavily critical of BBC coverage of the conflict in Northern Ireland and for allegedly expressing communist sympathies, for which some journalists were sacked.

As a frontbench spokesman on defence policy, he took a hard line on Rhodesia, voting against any sanctions. His presentation at the despatch box was strident for the times; he was censured by the Speaker for calling Foreign Secretary David Owen "treacherous" over the abandonment of Rhodesia. Thatcher, who succeeded Edward Heath as Conservative leader in 1975, dismissed Churchill from the Conservative front bench in November 1978. However, when the Conservatives came to power in the election of May 1979 he was elected to the executive of the 1922 Committee.

Boundary changes that took effect at the 1983 general election made his seat more marginal (it was subsequently taken by the Labour Party), and he transferred to the nearby Davyhulme constituency, which he represented until the seat was abolished for the 1997 general election. Although well known by virtue of his family history, he never achieved high office and remained a backbencher. His cousin, Nicholas Soames, was first elected a Conservative MP in 1983 and remained in Parliament until 2019.

During his time as a Member of Parliament, Churchill visited Beijing with a delegation of other MPs, including Clement Freud, a grandson of the psychoanalyst Sigmund Freud. Freud asked why Churchill was given the best room in the hotel, and was told it was because Churchill was a grandson of Britain's most illustrious Prime Minister. Freud responded by saying it was the first time in his life that he had been "out-grandfathered". After the 1990–91 Gulf War, Churchill visited British troops in the desert. When he introduced himself to a soldier, the soldier replied "Yes, and I'm Rommel", highlighting, as his father had told him, the comparative disadvantage in his name. He was the subject of controversy in 1995 when he and his family sold a large archive of his grandfather's papers for £12.5m to Churchill College, Cambridge. The purchase was funded by a grant from the newly established National Lottery.

After leaving Parliament at the 1997 election (his Davyhulme seat having been abolished), Churchill was a sought-after speaker on the lecture circuit, and wrote many articles in support of the Iraq War and the fight against Islamic terrorism. He also edited a compilation of his grandfather's famous speeches entitled Never Give In. In 2007, he acted as a spokesman for the pressure group UK National Defence Association. He was also involved with the National Benevolent Fund for the Aged, as trustee from 1974 and chair from 1995 to 2010. He attempted to be selected as an MEP, but was unsuccessful.

== Family ==
Churchill was the son of Randolph Churchill (1911–1968), the only son of Sir Winston Churchill, and his first wife Pamela Digby (1920–1997). His parents divorced in 1945. His father married June Osborne: their daughter was Arabella Churchill (1949–2007). His mother married W. Averell Harriman, former United States ambassador to the United Kingdom. Churchill's first marriage, in July 1964, was to Mary "Minnie" Caroline d'Erlanger, the daughter of the banker Sir Gerard John Regis d'Erlanger and granddaughter of Baron Emile Beaumont d'Erlanger. The couple had four children, including a son named Randolph. Churchill's second marriage, to Luce Engelen, a Belgian-born jewellery maker, lasted from 1997 until his death.

=== Ancestry ===
Ancestors of Winston Churchill (1940–2010)

8. Rt. Hon. Lord Randolph Spencer-Churchill
4. Rt. Hon. Sir Winston Spencer-Churchill
9. Jeanette Jerome
2. Hon. Randolph Spencer-Churchill
10. Sir Henry Hozier
5. Clementine Spencer-Churchill (née Hozier), Baroness Spencer-Churchill
11. Lady Henrietta Ogilvy
1. Winston Spencer-Churchill
12. Edward Digby, 10th Baron Digby
6. Edward Digby, 11th Baron Digby
13. Emily Hood
3. Hon. Pamela Digby
14. Henry Bruce, 2nd Baron Aberdare
7. Hon. Constance Bruce
15. Constance Beckett

== Death ==
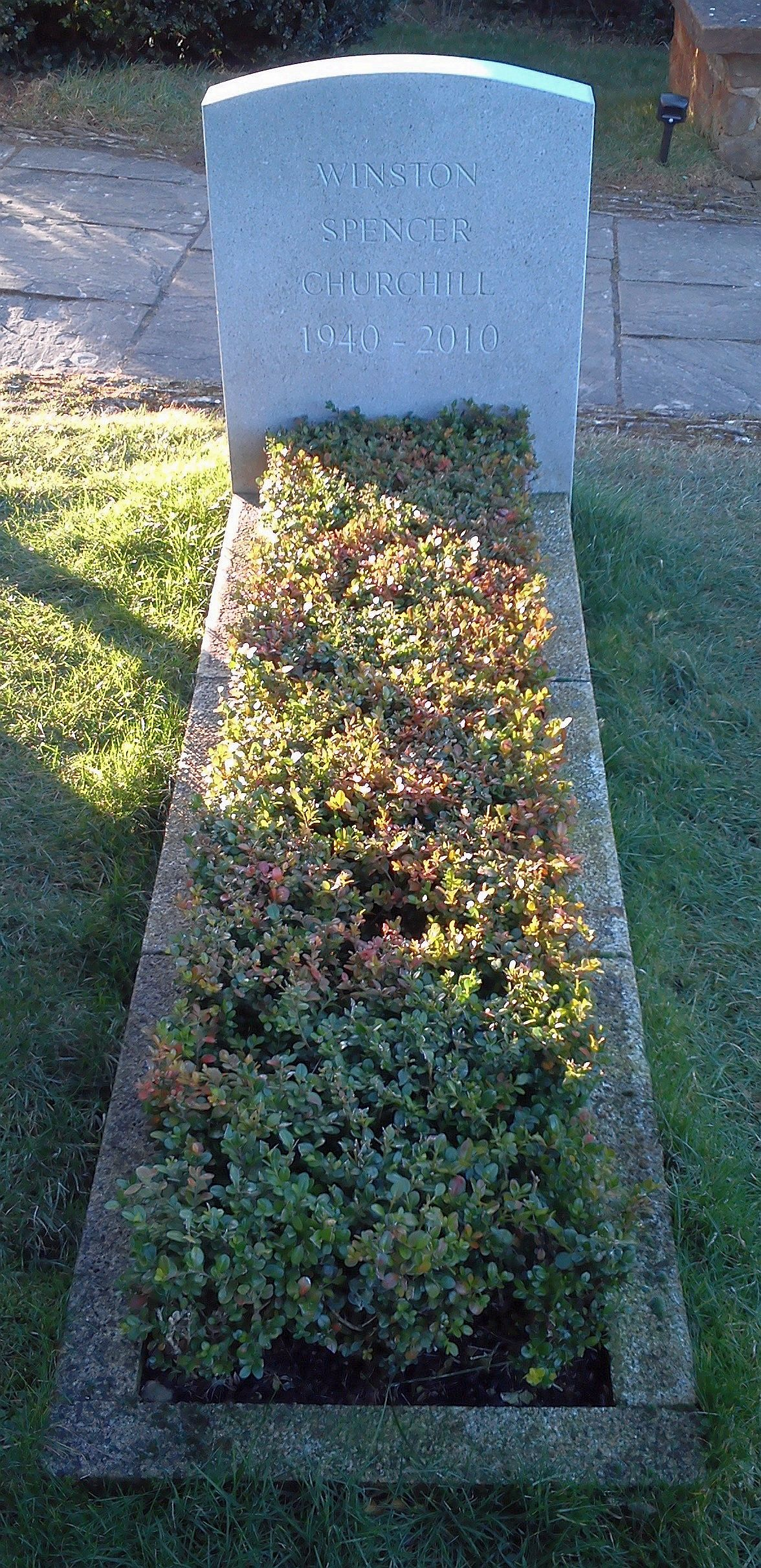
Churchill's grave at St Martin's Church, Bladon

Churchill lived in Belgravia, London, where he died aged 69 on 2 March 2010 from prostate cancer, from which he had suffered for the last two years of his life. On 9 March, he was buried in the family plot at St Martin’s Church in Bladon, near Woodstock, Oxfordshire.

== Publications ==
- First Journey (1964)
- Six Day War (1967), co-written with his father, Randolph Churchill.
- Defending the West (1981)
- Memories and Adventures (1989)
- His Father's Son (1996), a biography of his father, Randolph Churchill.
- The Great Republic (1999), editor
- Never Give In!: The Best of Winston Churchill's Speeches (2003), editor

== Notes ==
Parliament of the United Kingdom
Preceded by Ernest Davies	Member of Parliament for Stretford; 1970–1983	Succeeded by Tony Lloyd
New constituency	Member of Parliament for Davyhulme; 1983–1997	Constituency abolished
