= John Mount Batten =

British soldier and landowner

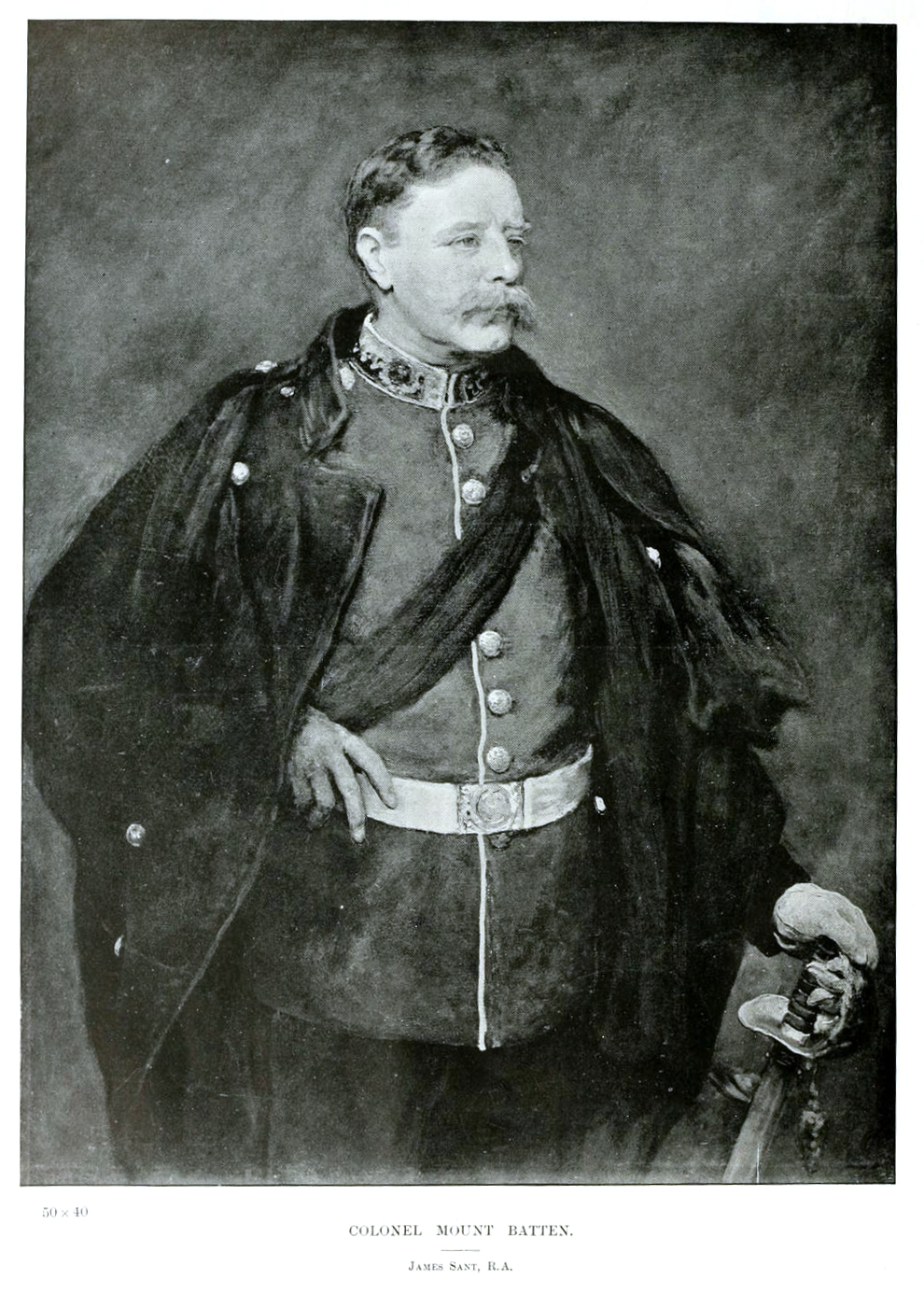

Colonel John Mount Batten, CB, JP (7 April 1843 – 5 March 1916) was a British soldier and landowner.

He was the eldest son of John Batten JP FSA, of Somerset, by his wife Grace Eleanor, daughter of John White of Upcerne, and was educated at Winchester. He married firstly, in 1873, Margaret Annie, eldest daughter of the Rev. John Brooks; she died in 1893. He married secondly, in 1895, Mary Edith, eldest daughter of James Sant RA and widow of H. F. Nalder; they had one son and four daughters.

Batten served in the British Army with 8th (The King's) Regiment of Foot (which was in 1881 renamed The King's (Liverpool Regiment)), from which he retired from active service with the rank of major on 9 March 1887. He was appointed lieutenant-colonel in command of the 3rd (Militia) battalion of the regiment (formerly the Duke of Lancaster's Own Rifles) on 1 October 1894, and later received the honorary rank of colonel. After the outbreak of the Second Boer War in South Africa in late 1899, the 3rd (militia) battalion was embodied for active service, with Batten in command. Following the end of the war in June 1902, the battalion returned to the United Kingdom on board the SS Walmer Castle, which arrived in Southampton in September that year.

He was a member of the Army and Navy Club. He was High Sheriff of Dorset in 1903, a Justice of the Peace for Somerset and Dorset, an Alderman of Dorset County Council, and from 1905 also served as Lord Lieutenant for Dorset and Poole. He was also patron of two livings. In 1908 he was made a Companion of the Order of the Bath (CB).

Colonel Batten lived at Upcerne, Cerne Abbas, Dorset and at Mornington Lodge, West Kensington, London W.

Despite the similarity of name, he was unrelated to the Princes of Battenberg, a morganaut branch of the House of Hesse who changed their name to Mountbatten in 1917. There is also a place called Mount Batten, part of the city of Plymouth, Devon.

== Principal source ==
- Who Was Who, vol. II
- "Batten, Col John Mount". Who's Who. A & C Black. (Subscription or UK public library membership required.)

Honorary titles
Preceded by The Earl of Ilchester	Lord Lieutenant of Dorset; 1906–1916	Succeeded by The Earl of Shaftesbury
