= UK National Defence Association =

Pressure group supporting an increase in the UK's defence budget

Old UKNDA logo

The UK National Defence Association (UKNDA) is a pressure group campaigning in support of Britain's Armed Forces and calling for an increase in the UK defence budget. It is Tri-Service (Navy, Army, Air Force).

Formed in 2007 by Admiral Lord Boyce, RAF Marshal Lord Craig and former Foreign Secretary Lord Owen, its Patrons are Field Marshal Lord Guthrie, Admiral Lord West and Lord Campbell (former Liberal Democrat leader). Its Founder-President was Winston S. Churchill (grandson of former Prime Minister Sir Winston Churchill) and Vice-Presidents include Sir Richard Dearlove (former head of the Secret Intelligence Service), Major-General Patrick Cordingley (commander of the Desert Rats in the Gulf War), Colonel Tim Collins (commander of 1st Royal Irish Regt in the Iraq War), and Colonel Bob Stewart (commander of United Nations forces in Bosnia).

Its former chief executive officer (CEO) was Commander John Muxworthy. Its current Director, CEO and spokesperson is Andy Smith. Under the alias AVR Smith, Smith was a former member of the Federation of Conservative Students and the Conservative Monday Club, becoming director of the Western Goals Institute in the late 1980s (where he hosted visits of French National Front leader Jean-Marie Le Pen and South African hardliner Andries Treurnicht to the UK), becoming good friends with WGI founder Gregory Lauder-Frost. He later became a member of the British-Israel-World Federation, who believe "all those of Anglo-Celto-Saxon descent" are direct descendants of the Ten Lost Tribes of Israel.

The UKNDA's 2008 policy paper, Overcoming the Defence Crisis, argues that the shrinking of the Defence budget from 5% of the UK's Gross Domestic Product in the 1980s to barely 2% in 2008 has left Britain's Armed Forces chronically under-funded and over-stretched. It calls for UK Defence policy to be "threat-driven, not budget-driven".

The organisation says it is politically neutral. However, in the 2015 general election, Smith spoke in favour of the UK Independence Party and the Northern Irish Democratic Unionist Party's policies of spending "at least" 2% GDP on defence, criticising Britain's two major parties (Labour and the Conservatives) for not having such a commitment. In 2016, Smith warned of an EU-controlled military force, saying that such a prospect was "a cause for great concern and one that should play heavily on the minds of British people as they ponder the choice before them in the EU referendum on 23 June".
