= 1973 West Dorset District Council election =

1973 UK local government election

10 May 1973	1976 →

All 55 seats to West Dorset District Council 28 seats needed for a majority
	First party	Second party
	Ind	Lib
Party	Independent	Liberal
Seats won	44	9
Popular vote	28,607	11,354
Percentage	60.2%	23.9%
	Third party
	Lab
Party	Labour
Seats won	2
Popular vote	7,569
Percentage	15.9%
Council control after election
Independent

The 1973 West Dorset District Council election was held on Thursday 10 May 1973 to elect councillors to the new West Dorset District Council in England. It took place on the same day as other district council elections in the United Kingdom.

These were the first elections to the new district council, which would come into effect on 1 April 1974. Future elections would take place every three years, with the next election scheduled for 6 May 1976.

The 1973 election saw Independent councillors take a significant majority on the Council.

== Ward results ==
=== Beaminster ===
Beaminster (2 seats)
Party	Candidate	Votes	%	±%
Independent	A. Hudson	654	–	N/A
Independent	R. Bugler	488	–	N/A
Independent	C. Coole	456	–	N/A
Independent	S. Chaffey	391	–	N/A
Turnout			29.2	N/A
Registered electors		2,239		
Independent win (new seat)				
Independent win (new seat)				

=== Bothenhampton ===
Bothenhampton
Party	Candidate	Votes	%	±%
Independent	O. Aburrow	unopposed	N/A	N/A
Registered electors		1,197		
Independent win (new seat)				

=== Bradford Abbas ===
Bradford Abbas
Party	Candidate	Votes	%	±%
Liberal	M. Winder	269	50.9	N/A
Independent	P. Bagnall	259	49.1	N/A
Majority		10	1.8	N/A
Turnout			42.4	N/A
Registered electors		1,244		
Liberal win (new seat)				

=== Bradpole ===
Bradpole
Party	Candidate	Votes	%	±%
Liberal	M. West	unopposed	N/A	N/A
Registered electors		1,137		
Liberal win (new seat)				

=== Bridport ===
Bridport (5 seats)
Party	Candidate	Votes	%	±%
Independent	H. Smith	1,430	–	N/A
Independent	P. Norfolk	946	–	N/A
Liberal	A. Tiltman	840	27.3	N/A
Labour	L. Dibden	812	26.3	N/A
Labour	H. Skevington	721	–	N/A
Independent	C. Samways	701	–	N/A
Independent	A. Cummins	676	–	N/A
Independent	T. Storrs	469	–	N/A
Independent	G. Fitzgerald	385	–	N/A
Turnout			59.6	N/A
Registered electors		5,169		
Independent win (new seat)				
Independent win (new seat)				
Liberal win (new seat)				
Labour win (new seat)				
Labour win (new seat)				

=== Broadmayne ===
Broadmayne
Party	Candidate	Votes	%	±%
Independent	W. White	197	56.1	N/A
Independent	H. Ross-Skinner	154	43.9	N/A
Majority		43	12.2	N/A
Turnout			30.8	N/A
Registered electors		1,139		
Independent win (new seat)				

=== Broadwindsor ===
Broadwindsor
Party	Candidate	Votes	%	±%
Independent	C. Coate	282	68.6	N/A
Independent	R. Biggs	129	31.4	N/A
Majority		153	37.2	N/A
Turnout			39.8	N/A
Registered electors		1,032		
Independent win (new seat)				

=== Burton Bradstock ===
Burton Bradstock
Party	Candidate	Votes	%	±%
Independent	G. Cheney	392	59.6	N/A
Independent	J. Mallinson	266	40.4	N/A
Majority		126	19.2	N/A
Turnout			61.6	N/A
Registered electors		1,068		
Independent win (new seat)				

=== Caundle Vale ===
Caundle Vale
Party	Candidate	Votes	%	±%
Independent	N. White	181	37.6	N/A
Liberal	E. Chant	161	33.5	N/A
Independent	D. Randolph	139	28.9	N/A
Majority		20	4.1	N/A
Turnout			50.0	N/A
Registered electors		962		
Independent win (new seat)				

=== Cerne Valley ===
Cerne Valley
Party	Candidate	Votes	%	±%
Independent	W. Best	unopposed	N/A	N/A
Registered electors		928		
Independent win (new seat)				

=== Charminster ===
Charminster
Party	Candidate	Votes	%	±%
Independent	E. Hanford	unopposed	N/A	N/A
Registered electors		1,269		
Independent win (new seat)				

=== Charmouth ===
Charmouth
Party	Candidate	Votes	%	±%
Independent	R. Fouger	unopposed	N/A	N/A
Registered electors		1,146		
Independent win (new seat)				

=== Chesil Bank ===
Chesil Bank
Party	Candidate	Votes	%	±%
Independent	M. Pengelly	unopposed	N/A	N/A
Registered electors		993		
Independent win (new seat)				

=== Chickerell ===
Chickerell (2 seats)
Party	Candidate	Votes	%	±%
Independent	L. Bennett	384	–	N/A
Independent	W. McCarthy	336	–	N/A
Independent	M. Groves	290	–	N/A
Turnout			15.6	N/A
Registered electors		2,461		
Independent win (new seat)				
Independent win (new seat)				

=== Dorchester Central ===
Dorchester Central
Party	Candidate	Votes	%	±%
Independent	L. Phillips	368	62.3	N/A
Independent	W. Bowering	164	27.7	N/A
Labour	A. Beards	59	10.0	N/A
Majority		204	34.6	N/A
Turnout			57.4	N/A
Registered electors		1,029		
Independent win (new seat)				

=== Dorchester East ===
Dorchester East (4 seats)
Party	Candidate	Votes	%	±%
Independent	R. Collins	1,205	–	N/A
Independent	J. Parsons	1,029	–	N/A
Liberal	Enid Stella Jones	977	32.8	N/A
Liberal	R. Brissenden	963	–	N/A
Independent	A. Woodroffe	921	–	N/A
Independent	J. Matthews	894	–	N/A
Liberal	P. Lucas	823	–	N/A
Labour	F. Holme	793	26.7	N/A
Labour	J. Brown	530	–	N/A
Labour	G. Megson	529	–	N/A
Labour	P. Gregory	529	–	N/A
Turnout			68.3	N/A
Registered electors		4,354		
Independent win (new seat)				
Independent win (new seat)				
Liberal win (new seat)				
Liberal win (new seat)				

=== Dorchester West ===
Dorchester West (5 seats)
Party	Candidate	Votes	%	±%
Independent	G. Powell	1,399	–	N/A
Independent	H. Durrant	1,152	–	N/A
Liberal	M. Bird	1,116	33.9	N/A
Liberal	David Trevor Jones	1,101	–	N/A
Liberal	D. Anderson	1,048	–	N/A
Labour	G. Standfeild	775	23.6	N/A
Labour	S. Balistrari	759	–	N/A
Labour	A. Yelling	704	–	N/A
Labour	A. Waldron	697	–	N/A
Labour	M. Murray	661	–	N/A
Turnout			71.2	N/A
Registered electors		4,622		
Independent win (new seat)				
Independent win (new seat)				
Liberal win (new seat)				
Liberal win (new seat)				
Liberal win (new seat)				

=== Frome Valley ===
Frome Valley
Party	Candidate	Votes	%	±%
Independent	B. Bryant	282	58.0	N/A
Independent	I. Collins	204	42.0	N/A
Majority		78	16.0	N/A
Turnout			49.5	N/A
Registered electors		982		
Independent win (new seat)				

=== Halstock ===
Halstock
Party	Candidate	Votes	%	±%
Independent	T. Frost	299	67.3	N/A
Independent	S. Hammick	145	32.7	N/A
Majority		154	34.6	N/A
Turnout			39.7	N/A
Registered electors		1,117		
Independent win (new seat)				

=== Holnest ===
Holnest
Party	Candidate	Votes	%	±%
Independent	M. Cockburn	211	47.0	N/A
Independent	J. Gray	121	26.9	N/A
Independent	A. Hill	117	26.1	N/A
Majority		90	20.1	N/A
Turnout			43.7	N/A
Registered electors		1,028		
Independent win (new seat)				

=== Loders ===
Loders
Party	Candidate	Votes	%	±%
Independent	E. Golding	399	76.7	N/A
Independent	C. Lucas	121	23.3	N/A
Majority		278	53.6	N/A
Turnout			62.4	N/A
Registered electors		833		
Independent win (new seat)				

=== Lyme Regis ===
Lyme Regis (3 seats)
Party	Candidate	Votes	%	±%
Independent	J. Broom	627	–	N/A
Independent	E. Hallett	580	–	N/A
Independent	V. Homyer	529	–	N/A
Independent	G. Upjohn	311	–	N/A
Independent	R. Hill	229	–	N/A
Turnout			22.7	N/A
Registered electors		2,761		
Independent win (new seat)				
Independent win (new seat)				
Independent win (new seat)				

=== Maiden Newton ===
Maiden Newton
Party	Candidate	Votes	%	±%
Independent	H. Haward	unopposed	N/A	N/A
Registered electors		959		
Independent win (new seat)				

=== Netherbury ===
Netherbury
Party	Candidate	Votes	%	±%
Independent	P. Tiarks	unopposed	N/A	N/A
Registered electors		1,216		
Independent win (new seat)				

=== Owermoigne ===
Owermoigne
Party	Candidate	Votes	%	±%
Independent	D. Baldwin	unopposed	N/A	N/A
Registered electors		1,010		
Independent win (new seat)				

=== Piddle Valley ===
Piddle Valley
Party	Candidate	Votes	%	±%
Independent	C. Green	379	89.6	N/A
Independent	S. Clear	44	10.4	N/A
Majority		335	79.2	N/A
Turnout			40.1	N/A
Registered electors		1,054		
Independent win (new seat)				

=== Puddletown ===
Puddletown
Party	Candidate	Votes	%	±%
Independent	E. Bown	unopposed	N/A	N/A
Registered electors		894		
Independent win (new seat)				

=== Queen Thorne ===
Queen Thorne
Party	Candidate	Votes	%	±%
Independent	J. Brewer	290	64.3	N/A
Independent	P. Thornton-Wood	161	35.7	N/A
Majority		129	28.6	N/A
Turnout			44.6	N/A
Registered electors		1,011		
Independent win (new seat)				

=== Sherborne ===
Sherborne (5 seats)
Party	Candidate	Votes	%	±%
Independent	E. King	1,400	–	N/A
Liberal	M. Matson	1,228	46.7	N/A
Independent	A. Sweet	1,217	–	N/A
Independent	E. Dyke	1,100	–	N/A
Independent	R. Farrant	1,030	–	N/A
Liberal	J. Barker	996	–	N/A
Liberal	W. Vincent	978	–	N/A
Independent	A. Lugg	917	–	N/A
Liberal	V. Quick	854	–	N/A
Turnout			46.7	N/A
Registered electors		5,629		
Independent win (new seat)				
Liberal win (new seat)				
Independent win (new seat)				
Independent win (new seat)				
Independent win (new seat)				

=== Stinsford ===
Stinsford
Party	Candidate	Votes	%	±%
Independent	E. Williams	334	63.6	N/A
Independent	W. Wakely	191	36.4	N/A
Majority		143	27.2	N/A
Turnout			64.7	N/A
Registered electors		812		
Independent win (new seat)				

=== Symondsbury ===
Symondsbury
Party	Candidate	Votes	%	±%
Independent	R. Forbes	unopposed	N/A	N/A
Registered electors		1,032		
Independent win (new seat)				

=== Thorncombe ===
Thorncombe
Party	Candidate	Votes	%	±%
Independent	P. Atyeo	112	66.3	N/A
Independent	M. Saunders	57	33.7	N/A
Majority		55	32.6	N/A
Turnout			17.2	N/A
Registered electors		962		
Independent win (new seat)				

=== Tolpuddle ===
Tolpuddle
Party	Candidate	Votes	%	±%
Independent	M. Kraft	unopposed	N/A	N/A
Registered electors		722		
Independent win (new seat)				

=== Whitchurch Canonicorum ===
Whitchurch Canonicorum
Party	Candidate	Votes	%	±%
Independent	W. Fowell	unopposed	N/A	N/A
Registered electors		1,083		
Independent win (new seat)				

=== Winterborne St Martin ===
Winterborne St Martin
Party	Candidate	Votes	%	±%
Independent	R. Childs	239	51.6	N/A
Independent	R. Hyde	224	48.4	N/A
Majority		15	3.2	N/A
Turnout			49.8	N/A
Registered electors		930		
Independent win (new seat)				

=== Yetminster ===
Yetminster
Party	Candidate	Votes	%	±%
Independent	F. Lawrence	unopposed	N/A	N/A
Registered electors		1,071		
Independent win (new seat)				
