= Michael Dooley (doctor) =

British doctor and civic leader

Michael Matthew Patrick Dooley, LVO, FRCOG, is a British doctor who has been Lord Lieutenant of Dorset since 2024.

== Early life ==
Dooley was born and educated in Wimbledon but moved to Dorset in 1989.

== Career ==
Dolley worked at Dorset County Hospital for over 25 years as a consultant obstetrician and gynaecologist. In 2013, he was named by Tatler Magazine as one of the country's top doctors.

He was lead Gynaecologist at the 2012 London Olympics, and Team Doctor for the British Equestrian Federation for eight years. He is also visiting professor at Bournemouth University.

Dooley is a fundraiser who has completed a number of charity treks. He is a friend of King Charles III and Queen Camilla.

Dooley was High Sheriff of Dorset 2021 to 2022. In September 2024, he replaced Angus Campbell as Lord Lieutenant of Dorset.

== Personal life ==
Dooley lives in Broadmayne with his wife, Barbara. They have three adult children and seven grandchildren.
