= Edward Digby, 11th Baron Digby =

British peer, soldier and politician

Colonel The Right Honourable The Lord Digby KG DSO MC & Bar TD JP
- Digby at Newbury Racecourse in 1925
- Born: 1 August 1894
- Died: 29 January 1964 (aged 69)
- Education: Eton College; Royal Military College, Sandhurst
- Spouse: Pamela Bruce (m. 1919)
- Parents: Edward Digby, 10th Baron Digby (father); Emily Hood (mother)
- Relatives: Pamela Harriman (daughter); Edward Digby, 12th Baron Digby (son)
- Military career
- Allegiance: United Kingdom
- Branch: British Army
- Service years: 1914–
- Rank: Colonel
- Unit: Coldstream Guards
- Conflicts: First World War; Western Front; Second World War
- Awards: Distinguished Service Order; Military Cross and Bar

Edward Kenelm Digby, 11th Baron Digby KG, DSO, MC & Bar, TD, JP (1 August 1894 – 29 January 1964), also 5th Baron Digby in the Peerage of Great Britain, was a British peer, soldier and politician.

== Early life ==
Digby was the son of Edward Henry Trafalgar Digby, 10th Baron Digby, and Emily Beryl Sissy Hood, daughter of the Hon. Arthur Hood. Admiral Sir Henry Digby was his great-grandfather, while on his mother's side he was a descendant of another naval commander, Admiral Samuel Hood, 1st Viscount Hood.

== Career ==
He succeeded his father as eleventh Baron Digby in 1920 and took his seat in the House of Lords. Like his father, Digby was a Colonel in the Coldstream Guards (adjutant of 1st Battalion 1916–18 and acting second-in-command 1918), and was appointed a Companion of the Distinguished Service Order and awarded the Military Cross and Bar. He was appointed Honorary Colonel of the Dorsetshire Heavy Brigade, Royal Artillery (a position his father had also held) on 8 December 1929 and continued with its successor unit the 421st (Dorset) Coast Regiment in 1947. He also served as Chairman of the Dorset County Council from 1955 to 1964 and as Lord Lieutenant of Dorset between 1952 and 1964. In 1960, he was made a Knight Companion of the Order of the Garter.

Lord Digby was Chairman of the Orchid Committee of the Royal Horticultural Society.

== Personal life ==
In 1919, Lord Digby married the Hon. Constance Pamela Alice Bruce, daughter of Henry Bruce, 2nd Baron Aberdare, and granddaughter of Henry Bruce, 1st Baron Aberdare. Their children include:

- The Hon. Pamela Beryl Digby (1920–1997), who married and divorced Randolph Churchill and later became American Ambassador to France.
- The Hon. Constance Sheila Digby (1921–2014), who married Charles Arthur Moore (1909–1989).
- The Hon. Edward Henry Kenelm Digby (later the 12th Baron; 1924–2018), who married Dione Sherbrooke, daughter of Rear-Adm. Robert Sherbrooke, in 1952.
- The Hon. Jacquetta Mary Theresa James (1928–2019), who married David Guthrie-James MP.

Lord Digby died in January 1964, aged 69, and was succeeded in his titles by his son, Edward. Lady Digby died on 15 March 1978.

== Arms ==
Coat of arms of Edward Kenelm Digby, 11th Baron Digby, KG, DSO, MC & Bar, TD, JP
Coronet A Baron's Coronet Crest An ostrich Proper, holding in the beak a horseshoe Or. Escutcheon Azure, a fleur-de-lis Argent. Supporters On either side a monkey proper environed about the middle and lined or. Motto DEO NON FORTUNA (From God not chance)

Honorary titles
Preceded by The Earl of Shaftesbury	Lord Lieutenant of Dorset; 1952–1964	Succeeded by Sir Joseph William Weld
Peerage of Ireland
Preceded by Edward Digby	Baron Digby; 1st creation 1920–1964	Succeeded by Edward Digby
Peerage of Great Britain
Preceded by Edward Digby	Baron Digby; 2nd creation 1920–1964; Member of the House of Lords (1920–1964)	Succeeded by Edward Digby
