= Edward Digby, 10th Baron Digby =

British peer and Conservative Member of Parliament

Coat of arms of Edward Digby, 10th Baron Digby
Crest An ostrich, holding in the beak a horse-shoe all proper. Escutcheon Azure, a fleur-de-lis argent Supporters On either side a monkey proper environed about the middle and lined or. Motto DEO NON FORTUNA (From God not chance)

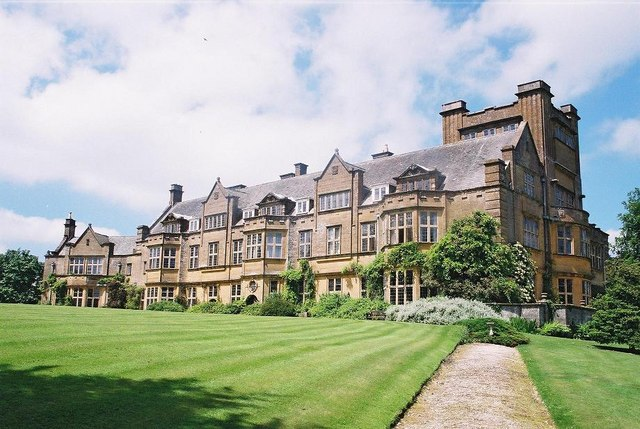
Minterne House, designed by Leonard Stokes, is the ancestral home of the Digby family

Edward Henry Trafalgar Digby, 10th Baron Digby (21 October 1846 – 11 May 1920), also 4th Baron Digby in the Peerage of Great Britain, was a British peer and Conservative Member of Parliament.

Digby was the eldest son of Edward Digby, 9th Baron Digby, son of Admiral Sir Henry Digby. His mother was Lady Theresa Anna Maria Fox-Strangways, daughter of Henry Fox-Strangways, 3rd Earl of Ilchester, while Jane Digby was his aunt. He was elected to the House of Commons for Dorset in 1876, a seat he held until 1885. In 1889, he succeeded his father in the two baronies and took his seat in the House of Lords.

He served in the Coldstream Guards. On 25 April 1891, he was appointed as the Honorary Colonel of the Dorset Militia, and on 28 November 1900, of the 1st Dorsetshire Royal Garrison Artillery (Volunteers).

Lord Digby married Emily Beryl Sissy Hood, daughter of Hon. Albert Hood, in 1893. He died in May 1920, aged 73, and was succeeded in his titles by his eldest son Edward Kenelm Digby. Lady Digby died in 1928. Hon. Pamela Digby, Lord Digby's granddaughter, became American Ambassador to France.

== Notes ==
Parliament of the United Kingdom
Preceded by Henry Gerard Sturt; Henry Berkeley Portman; John Floyer	Member of Parliament for Dorset; 1876–1885; With: Henry Berkeley Portman; John Floyer	Constituency abolished
Peerage of Ireland
Preceded by Edward St Vincent Digby	Baron Digby; 1889–1920	Succeeded by Edward Kenelm Digby
Peerage of Great Britain
Preceded by Edward St Vincent Digby	Baron Digby; 1889–1920	Succeeded by Edward Kenelm Digby
