= Pamela Harriman =

English-American diplomat and socialite (1920–1997)

58th United States Ambassador to France
- In office 30 June 1993 – 5 February 1997
- President: Bill Clinton
- Preceded by: Walter Curley
- Succeeded by: Felix Rohatyn

Personal details
- Born: Pamela Beryl Digby; 20 March 1920 Farnborough, Hampshire, England
- Died: 5 February 1997 (aged 76) Neuilly-sur-Seine, France
- Resting place: Arden, an estate near Harriman, New York
- Party: Democratic
- Spouses: Randolph Churchill (m. 1939; div. 1946) Leland Hayward (m. 1960; died 1971) W. Averell Harriman (m. 1971; died 1986)
- Children: Winston Churchill
- Parent: Edward Digby (father)
- Relatives: Edward Digby, 12th Baron Digby (brother)

Pamela Beryl Harriman (née Digby; 20 March 1920 – 5 February 1997), also known as Pamela Churchill Harriman, was an English political activist for the Democratic Party in the United States, diplomat, and socialite. She married three times: her first husband was Randolph Churchill, the son of prime minister Winston Churchill; her third husband was W. Averell Harriman, an American diplomat who also served as Governor of New York. Her only child, Winston Churchill, was named after his famous grandfather. She served as US ambassador to France from 1993 until her death in 1997.

== Early life ==
Pamela Digby was born in Farnborough, Hampshire, England, the daughter of Edward Digby, 11th Baron Digby, and his wife, Constance Pamela Alice, the daughter of Henry Campbell Bruce, 2nd Baron Aberdare. She was educated by governesses in the ancestral home at Minterne Magna in Dorset, along with her three younger siblings, and later attended Downham School. Her great-great aunt was the nineteenth-century adventurer and courtesan Jane Digby (1807–1881), notorious for her exotic travels and scandalous personal life. Pamela was to follow in her relative's footsteps, and has been called "the 20th-century's most influential courtesan".

Raised on acres of farmland and woodland in Dorset, she developed strong equestrian skills from an early age. She competed at prominent events such as the International Olympia and the Royal Bath and West Show, as well as at local shows in Dorchester and Melplash. She notably show-jumped a small pony named Stardust, which completed a clear round at Olympia despite all fences being above its withers.

At the age of seventeen, she was sent to a Munich boarding school for six months. While there she was introduced to Adolf Hitler by Unity Mitford. She subsequently went to Paris, taking some classes at the Sorbonne. Although in her Who's Who biography she identified these classes as "post-graduate" work, she actually never completed a university degree. By 1937, she had returned to Britain.

She was a descendant of the Earls of Leicester and Ilchester and the Dukes of Atholl. She was a first cousin of Lavinia Fitzalan-Howard, Duchess of Norfolk, a third cousin, once removed, of Angus Ogilvy, husband of Queen Elizabeth's cousin, Princess Alexandra of Kent and a fourth cousin, once removed, of Sarah Ferguson, former wife of Queen Elizabeth's son, Andrew Mountbatten-Windsor.

== Personal life ==
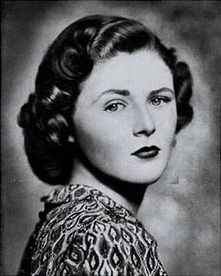
Pamela Digby, 18 June 1938 Coming of Age cover, Tatler

=== Marriage to Randolph Churchill ===
In 1939, while working at the Foreign Office in London doing French-to-English translations, the 19-year-old Pamela met Randolph Churchill, the son of Winston Churchill, who according to British writer Sonia Purnell was, "a womaniser and alcoholic, desperate for a wife having already proposed to eight women in the space of two weeks". Randolph proposed to her on the very evening they met, and they were married on 4 October 1939. Two days after Randolph Churchill took his seat in the House of Commons, their son Winston was born. Shortly after giving birth, Pamela and the newborn were photographed by Cecil Beaton for Life magazine, its first cover of a mother with baby.

In February 1941, Randolph was sent to Cairo with the British Commandos, acquiring gambling debts during the boat journey. Pamela was left to cope alone with a young baby and Randolph's creditors. His letter to Pamela asking her to make good on new gambling debt of $12,000 (equivalent to over $190,000 in 2020) forced her to take a £12-a-week job at the Ministry of Supply and sell her wedding presents and much of her jewellery, while keeping it a secret from her in-laws. She fell in love and started an affair with American envoy Averell Harriman, who was married and almost 30 years her senior. She filed for divorce in December 1945 on the grounds that Churchill had deserted her for three years. Later, after having converted to Catholicism, she obtained an annulment from the Catholic Church.

=== Romantic involvements and affairs ===
Besides two additional marriages, Churchill had numerous affairs with men of prominence and wealth. When her marriage to Randolph Churchill started to fall apart, she became romantically involved with Averell Harriman, who later became her third husband; Edward R. Murrow; and John Hay "Jock" Whitney. After her divorce from Churchill she was involved with Prince Aly Khan, Alfonso de Portago, Gianni Agnelli, and Baron Elie de Rothschild.

According to American author Michael Gross, Churchill became well known for her attention to detail with men. William S. Paley, briefly a consort during WWII, said: "She is the greatest courtesan of the century", meaning it as a compliment. The more critical Max Hastings said, acerbically, "she was ... described as having become 'a world expert on rich men's bedroom ceilings'."

In 1948, Harriman moved to Paris and began a five-year-long romance with Gianni Agnelli, a noted playboy and heir to the Fiat empire, who was a year younger than she was. She described this as the happiest period of her life. In August 1952, she walked in on him embracing a young woman, Anne-Marie d'Estainville, at a party. Later that night Agnelli sustained a severe leg injury in a car accident while taking d'Estainville home. By Pamela's account, she nursed him back to health while he was in hospital, then while he was convalescing in Turin they decided together to end their relationship. He continued to call her daily for the rest of her life.

Her next significant relationship was with Baron de Rothschild, who was married. He supported her financially, and she was schooled in art history and wine-making during this clandestine and short relationship. During this time she also had affairs with the writer Maurice Druon and with the shipping magnate Stavros Niarchos.

=== Marriage to Leland Hayward ===
In 1959, she met Broadway producer Leland Hayward, who was still married to Slim Hawks. He proposed to her, and after her marriage ultimatum to Rothschild was rejected, she accepted Hayward's offer and moved to New York City. The day Hayward's divorce was final, she became the fifth Mrs. Hayward with the ceremony taking place in Carson City, Nevada, on May 4, 1960. Hayward was rich with income from his productions, notably the very successful The Sound of Music, allowing for a luxurious lifestyle mostly between their residence in New York City and the Westchester County estate "Haywire." Haywire also became the name of the memoirs of her stepdaughter Brooke Hayward. Her step granddaughter through Brooke was Marin Hopper. Pamela Hayward stayed with her husband until his death on March 18, 1971.

=== Marriage to W. Averell Harriman ===
The day after Hayward's funeral, Pamela arranged to resume her acquaintance with her former lover, Harriman, then 79 years old and recently widowed. They were married on September 27, 1971. With this marriage, her social focus was moved to Washington, D.C., where he owned a townhouse in Georgetown from which they entertained many notable people. Harriman, a railroad heir, was wealthy and also bought an estate in Virginia and a private jet. With Harriman's involvement and links in the Democratic Party, her political career began. Her last marriage lasted until his death in 1986. In later years, she had many legal problems with Harriman's children concerning the inheritance.

Pamela Harriman served on The Rockefeller University Council from 1977 to 1979, and on the Board of Trustees from 1979 to 1993. She also served on the Board of Visitors of the College of William and Mary from 1986–1990 where she established The Pamela Harriman Professorship of Government and Public Policy and sponsored a scholarship in her name for three students to serve each summer at the US Embassy to France. In 1994, she spoke in an interview about her personal memories and the significance of the Allied invasion of Normandy in 1944.

== Political career ==
As Pamela Churchill Harriman she became a United States citizen in 1971 and became involved with the Democratic Party, creating a fund-raising system—a political action committee—named "Democrats for the 80s", later "Democrats for the 90s", and nicknamed "PamPAC". In 1980, the Woman's National Democratic Club named her "Woman of the Year." U.S. President Bill Clinton appointed her United States Ambassador to France in 1993. The Dayton Agreement was signed in Paris in 1995 while she served as ambassador.

== Death ==
External videos
- Memorial service for Pamela Harriman at National Cathedral, Washington, D.C. February 13, 1997, C-SPAN

Pamela Harriman died on February 5, 1997 at the American Hospital, Neuilly-sur-Seine, after suffering a cerebral hemorrhage while swimming at the Paris Ritz one day earlier. The morning after her death, President Jacques Chirac of France placed the Grand Cross of the Légion d'honneur on her flag-draped coffin. She was the first female foreign diplomat to receive this honour. In recognition of her service and importance, United States President Bill Clinton sent Air Force One to repatriate her body to the U.S., and spoke glowingly of her public service himself at her funeral on Feb. 13, 1997, at Washington National Cathedral in Washington, D.C. Harriman was buried February 14, 1997, at Arden, the former Harriman estate in New York. She was survived by her son and four grandchildren.

== In popular culture ==
Harriman's life story has been the subject of several films and novels, including the following:

- In the 2000 biography of Madeleine Albright, Pamela Harriman is cited in contrast to Albright, as a socialite who slept her way to the top.
- In the 2015 two-character play, Swimming at The Ritz by Charles Leipart, Pamela Harriman, in need of $40 million to settle a family lawsuit, regales the audience with tales from her past. She and a hotel valet wait in a Paris Ritz suite for appraisers from Christie's who are preparing to auction her possessions.
- A 2020 book about Winston Churchill during The Blitz, The Splendid and the Vile by Erik Larson, details Pamela's married life with Randolph Churchill, with whom she had Winston Churchill's near-namesake grandson, Winston Spencer-Churchill. The book details the devastating toll Randolph's compulsive gambling took on their marriage and concludes with her love affair with Averell Harriman along with their eventual marriage decades later.

== Coat of arms ==
Coat of arms of Pamela Harriman

Notes
These arms she bore by her father, the 11th Baron Digby. As a female, she bore them on a lozenge.
Escutcheon
Azure a Fleur-de-lys Argent.
Motto
DEO NON FORTUNA
(Latin: BY GOD, NOT BY CHANCE)

Diplomatic posts
Preceded by Walter J. P. Curley	U.S. Ambassador to France; 1993–1997	Succeeded by Felix G. Rohatyn
