= Valerie Pitt-Rivers =

Valerie Lane-Fox Pitt-Rivers CVO

Lord Lieutenant of Dorset
- In office 2006–2014
- Monarch: Elizabeth II
- Preceded by: Capt. Michael Fulford-Dobson
- Succeeded by: Ian Angus Campbell

Personal details
- Born: Valerie Scott; 23 January 1939 (age 87) Leeds, England, UK
- Spouse: Anthony Pitt-Rivers (m. 1964)
- Relatives: George Pitt-Rivers (father-in-law); Rosalind Pitt-Rivers (mother-in-law)
- Awards: Commander of the Royal Victorian Order

Valerie Lane-Fox Pitt-Rivers CVO (née Scott; born 23 January 1939) served as Lord Lieutenant of Dorset from 2006 until 2014. Upon her appointment as Lord Lieutenant in 2006, Pitt-Rivers became the first female Lord Lieutenant of Dorset and served as the representative of Queen Elizabeth II in the County of Dorset until her compulsory retirement at the age of 75 in 2014.

== Early life ==
Valerie Pitt-Rivers was born Valerie Scott in Leeds, Yorkshire, on 23 January 1939. She moved to London to pursue a career with an advertising agency. She had a successful career working on advertising campaigns for companies such as Camay Soap.

In 1964, in Westminster, she married Anthony Pitt-Rivers (né George Anthony Lane Fox Pitt-Rivers), born in 1932 in Marylebone, the only child of George Pitt-Rivers (1890–1966) and his second wife, Rosalind (1907–1990). In 1966, after his father's death, Anthony and Valerie moved to his ancestral country home in Dorset at Hinton St. Mary, near Sturminster Newton. Valerie and Anthony had no children. The Pitt-Rivers family estate at one time encompassed a large swath of Dorset, but a great deal was sold off after Anthony's father's death to the tenants as per the instructions of his will.

== Lord Lieutenant of Dorset ==
Pitt-Rivers was appointed Lord Lieutenant of Dorset in 2006 and during her tenure organised countless royal visits to Dorset, particularly during the Diamond Jubilee of Elizabeth II in 2012. She was also a keen supporter of a multitude of local and national charities, and organised the Lord Lieutenant's charity cricket match each year to raise money for charity. During her tenure, as Custos Rotolorum, she was chairperson of the Advisory Committees on Justices of the Peace and General Commissioners of Income Tax. She was supportive of local Cadet Forces and Reservist Units, and was attended on by Lord Lieutenant's Cadets at most of her military and civil appointments.

Upon her retirement from the post of Lord Lieutenant of Dorset in 2014, she was appointed as a Commander of the Royal Victorian Order (CVO) for her personal services to The Queen and members of the royal family. She is president of the Dorset Archives Trust and was appointed a Pro-Chancellor of Bournemouth University. She was succeeded in the office of Lord Lieutenant of Dorset by Ian Angus Campbell, former leader of Dorset County Council.
