= Lord Lieutenant of Dorset =

Monarch's representative in the English county

The Lord Lieutenant is the monarch's representative in the English county of Dorset.

The office of the lord-lieutenant was created during the reign of Henry VIII (1509–1547), taking over the military duties of the Sheriff of Dorset and control of the military forces of the Crown. From 1569, there was provision for the appointment of deputy lieutenants, and in 1662 the lord-lieutenant was given entire control of the militia. The Regulation of the Forces Act 1871 transferred this function back to the Crown, and in 1921, the office lost its power to call upon men of the county to fight in case of need.

== Appointment and current duties ==
Lord Lieutenants are appointed by the monarch for each county in the United Kingdom, to represent the Crown. They are non-political and retire at the age of 75. The post is unpaid.

The main duties of the Lord Lieutenant are:

- Arranging visits to the county by members of the royal family and escorting royal visitors;
- Presenting medals and awards on behalf of the monarch, and advising on honours nominations;
- As Custos Rotulorum of Dorset, leading local judicial bodies as Chairman of the Advisory Committees on Justices of the Peace and General Commissioners of Income Tax;
- Liaising with local units of the Royal Navy, Royal Marines, Army (and Army Reserve), Royal Air Force and associated cadet forces; and
- Participating in civic and voluntary activities.

== List of Lord Lieutenants of Dorset ==
Since 1680, Lord Lieutenants have also been Custos Rotulorum of Dorset.

- John Russell, 1st Earl of Bedford 1552–1555
- John Bourchier, 2nd Earl of Bath 1556–1558
- James Blount, 6th Baron Mountjoy 1559–?
- William Paulet, 3rd Marquess of Winchester 1580–
- Francis Russell, 2nd Earl of Bedford 1584 – 28 July 1585
- William Paulet, 3rd Marquess of Winchester 1 March 1586 – 24 November 1598
- vacant
- Thomas Howard, 3rd Viscount Howard of Bindon 25 April 1601 – 1 March 1611
- Robert Cecil, 1st Earl of Salisbury 5 July 1611 – 24 May 1612 jointly with
- Thomas Howard, 1st Earl of Suffolk 5 July 1611 – 28 May 1626
- Theophilus Howard, 2nd Earl of Suffolk 15 June 1626 – 3 June 1640
- Francis Cottington, 1st Baron Cottington 13 June 1640 – 15 May 1641
- William Cecil, 2nd Earl of Salisbury 15 May 1641 – 1642
- Interregnum
- Charles Stewart, 3rd Duke of Richmond 25 July 1660 – December 1672
- Anthony Ashley-Cooper, 1st Earl of Shaftesbury 20 January 1672 – 1674
- John Poulett, 3rd Baron Poulett 6 July 1674 – June 1679
- John Digby, 3rd Earl of Bristol 19 November 1679 – 18 September 1698
- Charles Paulet, 2nd Duke of Bolton 9 June 1699 – 21 January 1722
- Charles Powlett, 3rd Duke of Bolton 8 February 1722 – 1733
- Anthony Ashley-Cooper, 4th Earl of Shaftesbury 2 March 1734 – 29 May 1771
- Henry Digby, 1st Earl Digby 21 June 1771 – 25 September 1793
- George Pitt, 1st Baron Rivers 6 November 1793 – 7 May 1803
- George Damer, 2nd Earl of Dorchester 15 June 1803 – 7 March 1808
- Edward Digby, 2nd Earl Digby 17 April 1808 – 12 May 1856
- Anthony Ashley-Cooper, 7th Earl of Shaftesbury 4 June 1856 – 1 October 1885
- Henry Fox-Strangways, 5th Earl of Ilchester 5 November 1885 – 6 December 1905
- John Mount Batten 10 August 1906 – 5 March 1916
- Anthony Ashley-Cooper, 9th Earl of Shaftesbury 3 March 1916 – 1952
- Edward Digby, 11th Baron Digby 1 September 1952 – 29 January 1964
- Sir Joseph William Weld 30 June 1964 – 1984
- Edward Digby, 12th Baron Digby 1984–1999
- Capt. Michael Fulford-Dobson 1999–2006
- Valerie Lane-Fox Pitt-Rivers 2006–2014
- Ian Angus Campbell 2014–2024
- Michael Dooley 2024–
