= Davyhulme (constituency) =

UK Parliament constituency (1983–1997)

Coordinates: 53°28′N 2°22′W

- Former borough constituency for the House of Commons
- Davyhulme in Greater Manchester, showing boundaries used from 1983–1997
- County: Greater Manchester

1983–1997
- Seats: One
- Created from: Altrincham and Sale, Stretford and Knutsford
- Replaced by: Stretford and Urmston, Altrincham and Sale West and Wythenshawe and Sale East

Davyhulme was a parliamentary constituency in the Davyhulme suburb of Greater Manchester. It elected Conservative Winston Spencer-Churchill, grandson of Prime Minister Sir Winston Churchill, as a Member of Parliament of the House of Commons of the Parliament of the United Kingdom from its establishment for the 1983 general election until it was abolished for the 1997 general election.

Upon the constituency's abolition, the territory it covered was mostly incorporated into the new Stretford and Urmston constituency, with the Sale areas joining the new Wythenshawe and Sale East and Altrincham and Sale West constituencies.

== History ==
The constituency only existed for three elections spanning nine years; having been established for the 1983 general election and abolished by the 1997 general election. At that time, the constituency elected Churchill every election. Notional results released by the BBC and ITN ahead of the 1983 election estimated that had the constituency existed at the 1979 general election it would have been won by the Conservatives with a majority of 10,671 votes.

== Boundaries ==
1983–1997: The Metropolitan Borough of Trafford wards of Bucklow, Davyhulme East, Davyhulme West, Flixton, Mersey St Mary's, Priory, St Martin's, and Urmston.

== Members of Parliament ==
Election	Member	Party
1983	Winston Spencer Churchill	Conservative
1997	constituency abolished: see Stretford and Urmston, Altrincham and Sale West & Wythenshawe and Sale East	

== Elections ==
=== Elections in the 1990s ===
General election 1992: Davyhulme
Party	Candidate	Votes	%	±%
Conservative	Winston Churchill	24,213	48.0	+1.4
Labour	Barry Brotherton	19,790	39.2	+8.8
Liberal Democrats	Jacqueline Pearcey	5,797	11.5	−11.5
Natural Law	Terence L. Brotheridge	665	1.3	New
Majority		4,426	8.8	−7.4
Turnout		50,468	80.5	+3.2
Conservative hold		Swing	−3.7	

=== Elections in the 1980s ===
General election 1987: Davyhulme
Party	Candidate	Votes	%	±%
Conservative	Winston Churchill	23,633	46.6	+0.6
Labour	John Nicholson	15,434	30.4	+3.6
Liberal	Dennis Wrigley	11,637	23.0	−4.2
Majority		8,199	16.2	−2.6
Turnout		50,704	77.3	+3.4
Conservative hold		Swing	−1.5	

General election 1983: Davyhulme
Party	Candidate	Votes	%	±%
Conservative	Winston Churchill	22,055	46.0	
Liberal	Dennis Wrigley	13,041	27.2	
Labour	Sean Rogers	12,887	26.8	
Majority		9,014	18.8	
Turnout		47,983	73.9	
Conservative win (new seat)				
