= Dione Digby, Baroness Digby =

British arts administrator

Dione Marian Sherbrooke Baroness Digby DBE, DL
- Born: 23 February 1934 (age 92)
- Occupation: Arts administrator
- Spouse: Edward Digby (m. 1952; died 2018)
- Children: 3
- Parents: Rear-Adm. Robert St Vincent Sherbrooke (father); Rosemary Neville Buckley (mother)

Dione Marian Digby, Baroness Digby, DBE, DL (née Sherbrooke; born 23 February 1934) is a British arts administrator.

She is the daughter of Rear-Adm. Robert St Vincent Sherbrooke and his wife, Rosemary Neville Buckley. She married Edward Digby (son of Edward Kenelm Digby, 11th Baron Digby of Geashill, and the Hon. Constance Pamela Alice Bruce), on 18 December 1952. Her husband succeeded to the peerage in 1964; consequently, she became Baroness Digby by use of being married with him. They have two sons and a daughter (Henry Noel Kenelm Digby, Rupert Simon Digby and Zara Jane Digby).

A former chancellor of Bournemouth University, she was appointed Dame Commander of The Most Excellent Order of the British Empire in 1991.
