= Digby (name) =

Digby is an English language toponymic surname. It is derived from the village of Digby in Lincolnshire, England, the name of which originated from Old Norse "dic" (dyke, ditch) and "byr" (farm, settlement).

Notable people and characters with the name include:

== Surname ==
- Bruce Digby-Worsley (1899–1980), British flying ace
- Edward Digby (disambiguation), multiple people
- Grace Digby (1895–1964), British artist
- Henry Digby (disambiguation), multiple people
- Jane Digby (1807–1881), English aristocrat, famed for her love life and lifestyle.
- John Digby (disambiguation), multiple people
- Kenelm Digby (disambiguation), multiple people
- Lettice Digby (disambiguation), multiple people
- Margaret Digby (1902–1985), British writer
- Marié Digby (born 1983), American musician
- Robert Digby (disambiguation), multiple people
- Simon Digby (disambiguation), multiple people
- William Digby (disambiguation), multiple people

== Given name ==
- Digby Denham (1859–1944), Premier of Queensland, Australia
- Digby Fairweather (born 1946), British jazz trumpeter and cornetist
- Digby Ioane (born 1985), Australian rugby union player
- Digby Jones, Baron Jones of Birmingham (born 1955), British businessman and politician
- Digby Morrell (born 1979), Australian rules football player
- Digby (blogger) or Heather Digby Parton, writer of the liberal blog Hullabaloo
- Digby Smith (born 1935), British military historian
- Digby Tatham-Warter (1917–1993), British army officer in the Second World War
- Digby Willoughby (disambiguation), multiple people

== Fictional characters ==
- Albert Fitzwilliam Digby, batman and foil to Dan Dare in the Eagle series Dan Dare, Pilot of the Future and its revivals.
- Arthur Digby, in the BBC medical drama Holby City
- Morven Digby, in Holby City
- Salu Digby, also known as Shrinking Violet, Violet and Atom Girl, a Legion of Super-Heroes member
- Digby Geste, one of three brothers in the novel Beau Geste and its various adaptations
- Digby O'Dell, "the friendly undertaker" in The Life of Riley, an American comedy series
- the title character of Digby, the Biggest Dog in the World, a 1973 film starring Jim Dale
- a Cavalier King Charles Spaniel featured in the 2014 movie The Interview
- a Golden Retriever on the 2007–2009 television show Pushing Daisies
- a character in the video game series Animal Crossing
- A character in the 2012 cartoon TV show Littlest Pet Shop
- A cable ship in the Canadian children's television series Theodore Tugboat

== See also ==
- Baron Digby, a title in the Peerage of Ireland
