= Edward Digby =

Edward Digby may refer to:

- Edward Digby (died 1746), British MP for Warwickshire
- Edward Digby, 6th Baron Digby (1730–1757)
- Edward Digby, 2nd Earl Digby (1773–1856), British peer
- Edward Digby, 9th Baron Digby (1809–1889), British peer
- Edward Digby, 10th Baron Digby (1846–1920), British peer and politician
- Edward Digby, 11th Baron Digby (1894–1964), British peer, soldier and politician
- Edward Digby, 12th Baron Digby (1924–2018), British peer and British Army officer
- Edward Aylmer Digby (1883–1935), British naval officer and politician
