= Robert Digby =

Robert Digby may refer to:

- Robert Digby (courtier) (1574–1618)
- Robert Digby, 1st Baron Digby (c. 1599–1642)
- Robert Digby, 3rd Baron Digby (1654–1677)
- Robert Digby (died 1726), English member of parliament for Warwickshire
- Robert Digby (Royal Navy officer) (1732–1814), English member of parliament for Wells, 1757–1761

== See also ==
- Robert James Thomas Digby-Jones, Scottish recipient of the VC
