= Digby =

Digby may refer to:

== Places ==
=== Australia ===
- Digby, Victoria, a town

=== Canada ===
- Digby (electoral district), a former federal electoral district in Nova Scotia (1867–1914)
- Digby (provincial electoral district), a provincial electoral district in Nova Scotia (1867–1993)
- Digby County, Nova Scotia, a county in the Canadian province of Nova Scotia
  - Digby, Nova Scotia, a town
  - Digby, Nova Scotia (municipal district), the eastern half of Digby County

=== England ===
- Digby, Devon, a village in Exeter
  - Digby & Sowton railway station, Exeter
- Digby, Lincolnshire, a village and civil parish in North Kesteven

=== United States ===
- Digby, Ohio, an unincorporated community

== People and fictional characters ==
- Digby (name), a list of people and fictional characters with either the given name or surname
- Baron Digby, a title in the Peerage of Ireland
- Digby (blogger), pen name of Heather Digby Parton, writer of the liberal blog Hullabaloo

== Military ==
- HMCS Digby, a Royal Canadian Navy Second World War minesweeper
- RAF Digby, Lincolnshire, England, a former Royal Air Force station
- Douglas B-18 Bolo, a bomber used by the Royal Canadian Air Force as the Douglas Digby

== Arts and entertainment ==
- Digby (band), an American power pop band
- Digby (play), a 1985 play by Joseph Dougherty
