= Henry Digby =

Henry Digby may refer to:

- Henry Digby, 1st Earl Digby (1731–1793)
- Sir Henry Digby (Royal Navy officer) (1770–1842), British naval officer, served in the French Revolutionary and Napoleonic Wars
- Henry Digby, 13th Baron Digby (born 1954), the current Baron Digby

== See also ==
- Henry Digby Beste (1768–1836), Catholic aristocrat
