= William Digby =

William Digby may refer to:

- William Digby (priest) (1733–1788), British cleric
- William Digby (writer) (1849–1904), British writer
- William Digby, 5th Baron Digby (1661–1752), British peer and Member of Parliament
