= Baron Digby =

Barony in the Peerage of Great Britain

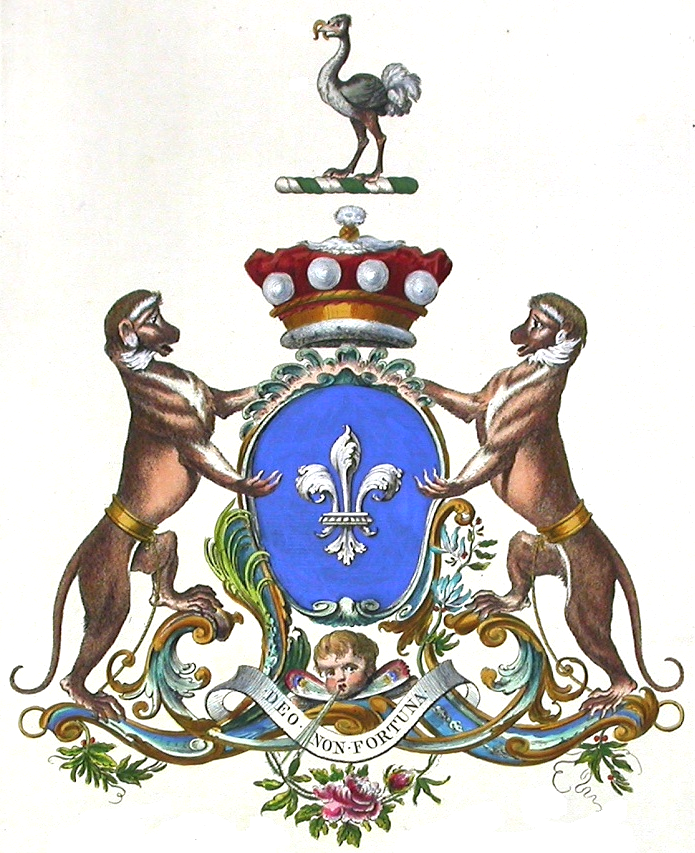
- Arms of Digby: Azure, a fleur-de-lis argent. Crest: An ostrich, holding in the beak a horse-shoe all proper. Supporters: On either side a monkey proper environed about the middle and lined or.
- Creation date: 29 July 1620 (Ire); 19 August 1765 (GB)
- Created by: James VI & I (Ire); George III (GB)
- Peerage: Ireland; Great Britain
- First holder: Robert Digby, 1st Baron Digby (Ire); Henry Digby, 7th and 1st Baron Digby (GB)
- Present holder: Henry Digby, 13th and 7th Baron Digby
- Heir apparent: Hon. Edward Digby
- Remainder to: The 1st Baron's heirs male of the body lawfully begotten (Ire). The 7th Baron's father's heirs male of the body lawfully begotten (GB).
- Status: Extant
- Seat: Minterne House
- Motto: DEO NON FORTUNA (From God not chance)

Baron Digby is a title that has been created twice, once in the Peerage of Ireland and once in the Peerage of Great Britain, for members of the same family.

Robert Digby, Governor of King's County, was created Baron Digby, of Geashill in the King's County, in the Peerage of Ireland in 1620. He was the nephew of John Digby, 1st Earl of Bristol. Lord Digby's grandson, the third Baron, and the latter's younger brothers, the fourth and fifth Barons, all represented Warwick in Parliament.

The 5th Baron's grandson, the 6th Baron, sat as a Member of Parliament for Malmesbury and for Wells. His younger brother, the 7th Baron, represented Ludgershall and Wells in the House of Commons. In 1765, he was created Baron Digby, of Sherborne in the County of Dorset, in the Peerage of Great Britain, with remainder to the male issue of his father. In 1790, Lord Digby was further honoured when he was made Viscount Coleshill and Earl Digby also in the Peerage of Great Britain, with remainder to the issue male of his body.

His son, the 2nd Earl, was Lord Lieutenant of Dorset from 1808 to 1856. He never married, and on his death in 1856, the viscountcy and earldom became extinct. However, he was succeeded in the two baronies by his first cousin once removed, the 9th Baron. He was the son of Admiral Sir Henry Digby, son of the Very Reverend the Honourable William Digby, younger brother of the 6th Baron and the first Earl Digby. His son, the 10th Baron, sat as a Conservative Member of Parliament for Dorset. He was succeeded by his son, the 11th Baron. He was Chairman of the Dorset County Council from 1955 to 1964 and Lord Lieutenant of Dorset from 1952 to 1964. The son, the 12th Baron, also served as Lord Lieutenant of Dorset from 1984 to 1999. As of 2018 the titles are held by his son, the 13th Baron, who succeeded in 2018. The heir apparent is the present holder's son, the Hon. Edward St Vincent Kenelm Digby, who was educated at Eton College and St Hugh's College, Oxford.

Two female members of the family have also gained fame. Jane Digby was the sister of the 9th Baron while Hon. Pamela Harriman (née Digby), American Ambassador to France, was the eldest daughter of the 11th Baron and the sister of the 12th Baron.

The family seat is Minterne House, near Dorchester, Dorset.

== Baron Digby (1620, Ire) ==
- Robert Digby, 1st Baron Digby (c. 1599 – 1642)
- Kildare Digby, 2nd Baron Digby (c. 1627 – 1661)
- Robert Digby, 3rd Baron Digby (1654–1677)
- Simon Digby, 4th Baron Digby (1657–1685)
- William Digby, 5th Baron Digby (1661–1752)
- Edward Digby, 6th Baron Digby (1730–1757)
- Henry Digby, 7th Baron Digby (1731–1793) (created Baron Digby [GB] in 1765)

=== Baron Digby (1765, GB) ===
- Henry Digby, 7th and 1st Baron Digby (1731–1793) (created Earl Digby in 1790)

=== Earl Digby (1790) ===
- Henry Digby, 1st Earl Digby, 7th and 1st Baron Digby (1731–1793)
- Edward Digby, 2nd Earl Digby, 8th and 2nd Baron Digby (1773–1856)

=== Baron Digby (1620, 1765; reverted) ===
- Edward St Vincent Digby, 9th and 3rd Baron Digby (1809–1889)
- Edward Henry Trafalgar Digby, 10th and 4th Baron Digby (1846–1920)
- Edward Kenelm Digby, 11th and 5th Baron Digby (1894–1964)
- Edward Henry Kenelm Digby, 12th and 6th Baron Digby (1924–2018)
- Henry Noel Kenelm Digby, 13th and 7th Baron Digby (born 1954)

The heir apparent is the present holder's son, the Hon. Edward St Vincent Kenelm Digby (born 1985). The heir apparent's heir, and next in line, is his elder twin son Henry George Kenelm Digby (born 2018).

=== Title succession chart ===
Title succession chart, Barons Digby and Earls Digby.

Robert Digby; 1st Baron Digby c. 1599 – 1642
Kildare Digby; 2nd Baron Digby c. 1627 – 1661
Hon. Robert Digby; 1653–1653	Robert Digby; 3rd Baron Digby; 1654–1677	Simon Digby; 4th Baron Digby; 1657–1685	William Digby; 5th Baron Digby; 1661–1752
Hon. John Digby c. 1687 – 1746	Hon. Robert Digby c. 1692 – 1726	Hon. Edward Digby c. 1693 – 1746
Baron Digby (1765, GB); Viscount Coleshill; Earl Digby (both 1790)
Edward Digby; 6th Baron Digby; 1730–1757	Henry Digby; 1st Earl Digby; 7th/1st Baron Digby; 1731–1793	Adm. Robert Digby; 1732–1815	Very Rev. Hon. William Digby; 1733–1788
Edward Digby; 2nd Earl Digby; 8th/2nd Baron Digby; 1773–1856	Hon. Henry Digby; 1774–1776	Rev. Hon. Robert Digby; 1775–1830	Hon. Stephen Digby; 1776–1795	Adm. Sir Henry Digby; 1770–1842
Viscountcy and earldom extinct
Edward Digby; 9th/3rd Baron Digby; 1809–1889
Edward Digby; 10th/4th Baron Digby; 1846–1920
Edward Digby; 11th/5th Baron Digby; 1894–1964
Edward Digby; 12th/6th Baron Digby; 1924–2018
Henry Digby; 13th/7th Baron Digby born 1954
Hon. Edward Digby born 1985
Henry Digby born 2018

== See also ==
- Earls of Bristol, first creation
- Sir Henry Digby
- Jane Digby
- Pamela Digby
- Geashill
