= Henry Digby, 1st Earl Digby =

British peer and MP (1731–1793)

The Right Honourable The Earl Digby

Member of Parliament for Wells
- In office 1761–1765 Serving with Clement Tudway
- Preceded by: Charles Tudway; Robert Digby
- Succeeded by: Clement Tudway; Peter Taylor

Member of Parliament for Ludgershall
- In office 1755–1761 Serving with Thomas Hayward
- Preceded by: Sir John Bland; Thomas Hayward
- Succeeded by: Thomas Whately; John Paterson

Personal details
- Born: Henry Digby; 21 July 1731
- Died: 25 September 1793 (aged 62)
- Spouses: Elizabeth Feilding (m. 1763; died 1765) Mary Knowler (m. 1770)
- Relations: Edward Digby, 6th Baron Digby (brother); William Digby, 5th Baron Digby (grandfather); Henry Fox, 1st Baron Holland (uncle); Charles James Fox (cousin)
- Children: 6
- Parent(s): Hon. Edward Digby; Charlotte Fox

Henry Digby, 1st Earl Digby (21 July 1731 – 25 September 1793), was a British peer and Member of Parliament.

== Early life ==
Digby was the younger son of Charlotte Fox and Hon. Edward Digby, a Member of Parliament for Warwickshire from 1726 to 1746. His elder brother was Edward Digby, 6th Baron Digby, a Groom of the Bedchamber to the Prince of Wales from 1751 to 1753.

His paternal grandparents were William Digby, 5th Baron Digby, and Lady Jane Noel (second daughter of Edward Noel, 1st Earl of Gainsborough, and Lady Elizabeth Wriothesley, the eldest daughter and co-heiress of Thomas Wriothesley, 4th Earl of Southampton). His mother was the daughter of Sir Stephen Fox. Henry Fox, 1st Baron Holland, was his uncle and Charles James Fox his cousin.

== Career ==
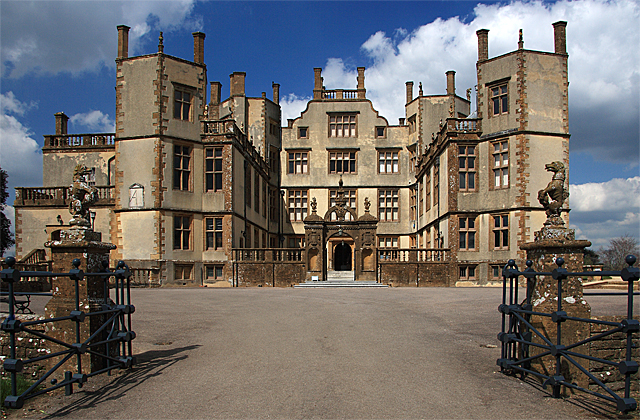
Sherborne Castle, Dorset.

Digby was elected to the House of Commons for Ludgershall in 1755, a seat he held until 1761, and then represented Wells between 1761 and 1765. From 1763 to 1765, he was a Lord of the Admiralty. In 1757 he succeeded his elder brother Edward as the 7th Baron Digby but as this was an Irish peerage it did not entitle him to sit in the British House of Lords and did not force him to resign his seat in the House of Commons. It did however give him ownership of the family seat of Sherborne Castle.

In 1765 Digby was created Baron Digby, of Sherborne in the County of Dorset, in the Peerage of Great Britain with remainder to the male issue of his father. He had then to give up his seat in the Commons and join his peers in the Lords. From 1771 to 1793 Lord Digby served as Lord Lieutenant of Dorset.

In 1790 he was further honoured when he was Viscount Coleshill and Earl Digby in the Peerage of Great Britain, with remainder to his heirs male.

== Personal life ==
On 5 September 1763, Lord Digby married Elizabeth Feilding, a daughter of Hon. Charles Feilding (a son of Basil Feilding, 4th Earl of Denbigh and Hester Firebrace, eldest daughter and heiress of Sir Basil Firebrace, 1st Baronet) and Anne (née Palmer) Bridges (the widow of Sir Brook Bridges, 2nd Baronet and daughter, and co-heiress of Sir Thomas Palmer, 4th Baronet, of Wingham). Together, they had one son:

- Hon. Edward Digby (1764–1764), who died in infancy.

After his first wife's death in 1765 he married, secondly, Mary Knowler, daughter of John Knowler Recorder of Canterbury, on 10 November 1770. They had five children:

- Lady Charlotte Digby (1772–1807), married William Wingfield, MP for Bodmin, in 1796.
- Edward Digby, 2nd Earl Digby (1773–1856), who served as Lord Lieutenant of Dorset from 1808 to 1856.
- Hon. Henry Digby (1774–1776), who died in infancy.
- Hon. Rev. Robert Digby (1775–1830), the rector of Sheldon and vicar of Coleshill.
- Hon. Stephen Digby (1776–1795), who died young.

Lord Digby died in September 1793, aged 62, and was succeeded in his title by his eldest son Edward. Countess Digby died in 1794. As his eldest son died unmarried and without issue in 1856, the viscountcy and earldom became extinct and the barony passed to his cousin, Edward St Vincent Digby.

== Coat of arms ==
Coat of arms of Henry Digby, 1st Earl Digby
Crest An ostrich, holding in the beak a horse-shoe all proper. Escutcheon Azure, a fleur-de-lis argent Supporters On either side a monkey proper environed about the middle and lined or. Motto DEO NON FORTUNA (From God not chance)

Parliament of Great Britain
Preceded by Sir John Bland; Thomas Hayward	Member of Parliament for Ludgershall; 1755–1761; With: Thomas Hayward	Succeeded by Thomas Whately; John Paterson
Preceded by Charles Tudway; Robert Digby	Member of Parliament for Wells; 1761–1765; With: Clement Tudway	Succeeded by Clement Tudway; Peter Taylor
Honorary titles
Preceded by The Earl of Shaftesbury	Lord Lieutenant of Dorset; 1771–1793	Succeeded by The Lord Rivers
Peerage of Great Britain
New creation	Earl Digby; 1790–1793	Succeeded by Edward Digby
New creation	Baron Digby; 1765–1793	Succeeded by Edward Digby
Peerage of Ireland
Preceded by Edward Digby	Baron Digby; 1757–1793	Succeeded by Edward Digby
