= William Peyto (died 1734) =

William Peyto (before 1698 – 11 January 1734) was an English politician who sat in the House of Commons from 1715 to 1734.

Peyto was the eldest son William Peyto of Chesterton, Warwickshire and his wife Elizabeth. His father had been Sheriff of Warwickshire in 1695 and died in 1699. The Peytos had been a significant family Warwickshire for hundreds of years, and had acquired the Chesterton estate. A William Peyto was a Member of Parliament (MP) for Warwickshire in 1420, and another had been Sheriff of Warwickshire in 1602.

At the 1715 general election, Peyto was elected as an MP for Warwickshire. A Tory and Jacobite who voted consistently against the government, he was re-elected in 1722 and 1727.

Peyto died unmarried on 11 January 1734, a few months before the 1734 election.

Parliament of Great Britain
Preceded by Sir John Mordaunt, Bt; Andrew Archer	Member of Parliament for Warwickshire; 1715–1734; With: Andrew Archer to 1722; Robert Digby 1722–26; Edward Digby from 1726	Succeeded by Edward Digby; Sir Charles Mordaunt, Bt
