= HMS Solebay (1742) =

Royal Navy sixth-rate frigate

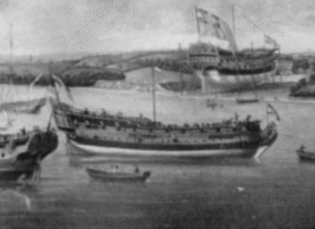
- Solebay in a painting by Samuel Scott

History

Great Britain
- Name: Solebay
- Namesake: Battle of Solebay
- Ordered: 30 June 1740
- Builder: Digory Veale, Plymouth Dockyard
- Cost: £7,269
- Laid down: 11 July 1740
- Launched: 20 July 1742
- Completed: 19 August 1742
- Commissioned: 3 July 1742
- Captured: 6 August 1744

France
- Name: Solebay
- Acquired: 6 August 1744
- Captured: 20 April 1746

Great Britain
- Name: Solebay
- Acquired: 20 April 1746
- Commissioned: August 1746
- Fate: Sold into merchant service, 1763

General characteristics
- Class & type: 1733 Establishment sixth-rate frigate
- Tons burthen: 42929/94 (bm)
- Length: Gundeck: 106 ft (32.3 m); Keel: 87 ft (26.5 m)
- Beam: 30 ft 5 1/2 in (9.3 m)
- Draught: 8 ft 5 in (2.6 m) (forward); 10 ft 9 3/4 in (3.3 m) (aft)
- Depth of hold: 9 ft 5 in (2.9 m)
- Propulsion: Sails
- Complement: 140 (1742); 160 (1745)
- Armament: UD: 20 × 9-pounder guns; LD: 2 × 9-pounder guns; QD: 2 × 3-pounder guns

HMS Solebay was a 24-gun frigate of the Royal Navy. Commissioned in 1742 for the War of Jenkins' Ear, she served off Gibraltar and in the Mediterranean Sea until she was captured by a French squadron off Cape St Vincent two years later. Commissioned into the French Navy under the same name, Solebay served off the coast of France until she was recaptured by a British privateer in 1746. Decommissioned when the war ended in 1748, the ship was put back into service for the Seven Years' War.

Operating off the east coast of Scotland from 1756, Solebay hunted privateers and deterred smugglers. On 26 May 1758 she fought an inconclusive action in the Firth of Forth against the French frigate Maréchal de Belleisle, during which Solebay's captain was shot in the throat. Solebay saw further service on the Downs Station and off Calais before being paid off at the end of the war in 1763. The frigate was then put up for sale and bought to be converted into a merchant ship. She was last recorded as serving as an Indiaman in 1765.

== Design and construction ==
Solebay was a 9-pounder sixth-rate frigate. (Note: Ships of the Royal Navy were categorised in a rating system. Sixth-rate ships held between twenty and thirty guns.) Frigates were three-masted, full-rigged ships that carried their main battery on a single, continuous gun deck. They were smaller and faster than ships of the line and primarily intended for raiding, reconnaissance and messaging. Prior to the start of the War of Jenkins' Ear between Britain and Spain in 1739, the Admiralty ordered twenty-four new 20-gun frigates to be built to the 1733 Establishment specifications. Ostensibly designed by Sir Jacob Ackworth, these ships were in fact close copies of the 1733 HMS Tartar, designed by Richard Stacey. While Tartar and her sister ship HMS Kennington had been constructed by Royal Dockyards, this new batch of ships was contracted out to private dockyards. They otherwise differed by having two pairs of gun ports on the lower deck. (Note: These ports were ordered to be closed over in 1754.) In June 1740 two more ships were ordered to this design, with Solebay, the last, being the first of the class to be officially designated a 24-gun frigate rather than a 20-gun one.

The ship was ordered on 30 June 1740 to be built at Plymouth Dockyard by Digory Veale and was laid down on 11 July. The Admiralty dispensed with Veale's services on 5 December and the construction was completed in his yard by dockyard staff. Solebay was launched on 20 July 1742 with the following dimensions: 106 feet (32.3 m) along the gun deck, 87 feet (26.5 m) at the keel, with a beam of 30 feet 5 1/2 inches (9.3 m) and a depth in the hold of 9 feet 5 inches (2.9 m). Her draught was 8 feet 5 inches (2.6 m) forward and 10 feet 9 3/4 inches (3.3 m) aft, and the ship was calculated at 429 29/94 tons burthen. Solebay was fitted out at Plymouth and completed on 19 August, having cost £7,269 of which Veale received £1,533. She was named Solebay after the 1672 Battle of Solebay, the third Royal Navy warship to bear the name.

Solebay had a complement of 140, which was increased to 160 in 1745. The ship held twenty 9-pounder long guns on her upper deck. Initially this was her complete armament, but in c.1745 two 9-pounder guns were added to fill the lower deck gun ports, and two 3-pounder guns were placed on the quarterdeck.

== Service ==
=== War of Jenkins' Ear ===
Solebay was commissioned by Captain Thomas Bury on 3 July 1742. After initially serving in the Straits of Gibraltar, the frigate was moved into the Mediterranean Sea in 1743. On 23 February the following year Solebay chased a Spanish privateer in land near Cape Spartel. Solebay fired on the privateer as she went but was unable to catch her before night fell, abandoning the chase. The biographer John Charnock posits that, heavily damaged by Solebay's fire, the privateer sank soon afterwards.

Solebay came across the Spanish 26-gun ship Concordia off Cádiz on 25 February, as she arrived from Veracruz with an expensive cargo. After a chase Solebay caught up with Concordia, which fired at her. The two ships fought for four hours before Concordia surrendered, having seven men killed and twenty wounded to Solebay's seven wounded. The frigate then captured the Spanish 24-gun privateer Grand Carlo Magno after a brief battle on 28 June.

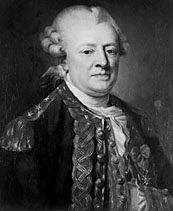
Captain Sébastien Bigot de Morogues commanded Solebay during her French Navy service

Solebay was sent to gather intelligence between Gibraltar and Cape St Vincent in August, afterwards to return to a position off Lisbon. On 5 August the ship came across a French squadron off Cape St Vincent under the command of Chef d'escadre François-César de Vimeur de Rochambeau. Solebay attempted to escape this force and sailed away from it, but was chased into the night. As the French began to catch up with Solebay, Bury had the ship tack in an attempt to use the cover of night to sail past them. The frigate was spotted by the 64-gun ship of the line Saint Michel as she undertook the manoeuvre. Bury surrendered without a fight when the French ship advanced on him. He was released from captivity on 15 January 1745 and court martialled for the loss of Solebay. He was deducted twelve months of pay for not attempting to defend the ship.

Solebay was taken into service with the French Navy under the same name, listed as a 20-gun frigate with a complement of 220 men and between four and seven officers. Her quarterdeck was lengthened but she was otherwise configured as she had been in British service. Captain Sébastien Bigot de Morogues took command of the ship on 26 January, serving off the French coast on patrol and escort duties. Solebay was sailing off Île de Ré on 20 April 1746, under the command of Captain Jeane Baptiste Le Veyer de Poulconq. As she prepared to enter Saint-Martin-de-Ré alongside a storeship, Solebay was spotted by the British 20-gun privateer Alexander, commanded by Captain Samuel Phillips. The British waited for Solebay to come to anchor in the entrance of the Ré roadstead, and then grappled onto the bow of the frigate. Phillips boarded Solebay with fifty men across her bowsprit at about 3 p.m.

Having been keeping a poor lookout, the French crew was unprepared for the attack. Phillips had the remaining men on Alexander fire two vollies with small arms into the defenders on deck, forcing them to retreat into cover below Solebay's quarterdeck. The French then began to fire back at Alexander's men, and to deter this Phillips had Alexander fire five of her cannon into them. The French crew surrendered, having lost fifteen men killed to Alexander's three. Taken back to Alexander's home port of Bristol on 21 April, Solebay was surveyed by the Admiralty on 30 June and repurchased on 11 August for £3,758. The naval historian N. A. M. Rodger describes the cutting out of Solebay as a humiliation for the Royal Navy, contrasting the gallant conduct of Alexander's crew with the lacklustre performance of Solebay's original men. Phillips was presented to George II on 2 May who awarded him a gold medal and 500 guineas in congratulations for the action. (Note: The crew of Alexander received prize money for the capture of Solebay in July 1747.)

The frigate was recommissioned into the Royal Navy in August, under the command of Captain John Vaughan. Intended to serve on patrol duties and escorting convoys, Solebay was refitted at Plymouth between December and March 1747, costing a further £2,852. Patrolling alongside the 44-gun ship HMS Southsea Castle, on 13 April Solebay captured the French privateer Grand Alexandre. The war ended in 1748, with Vaughan leaving command of the frigate.

=== Seven Years' War ===
Solebay was surveyed on 10 August 1749. No action resulted from this work, but on 16 November 1754 the vessel, now at Chatham Dockyard, was re-surveyed and a repair began. This was completed by William Martin at his Chatham yard, with work ongoing until September 1755. This cost a total of £3,644, and Solebay was recommissioned by Captain Robert Digby on 5 August. He was translated into a new ship in the next year and in April 1756 Captain John Fergussone took command.

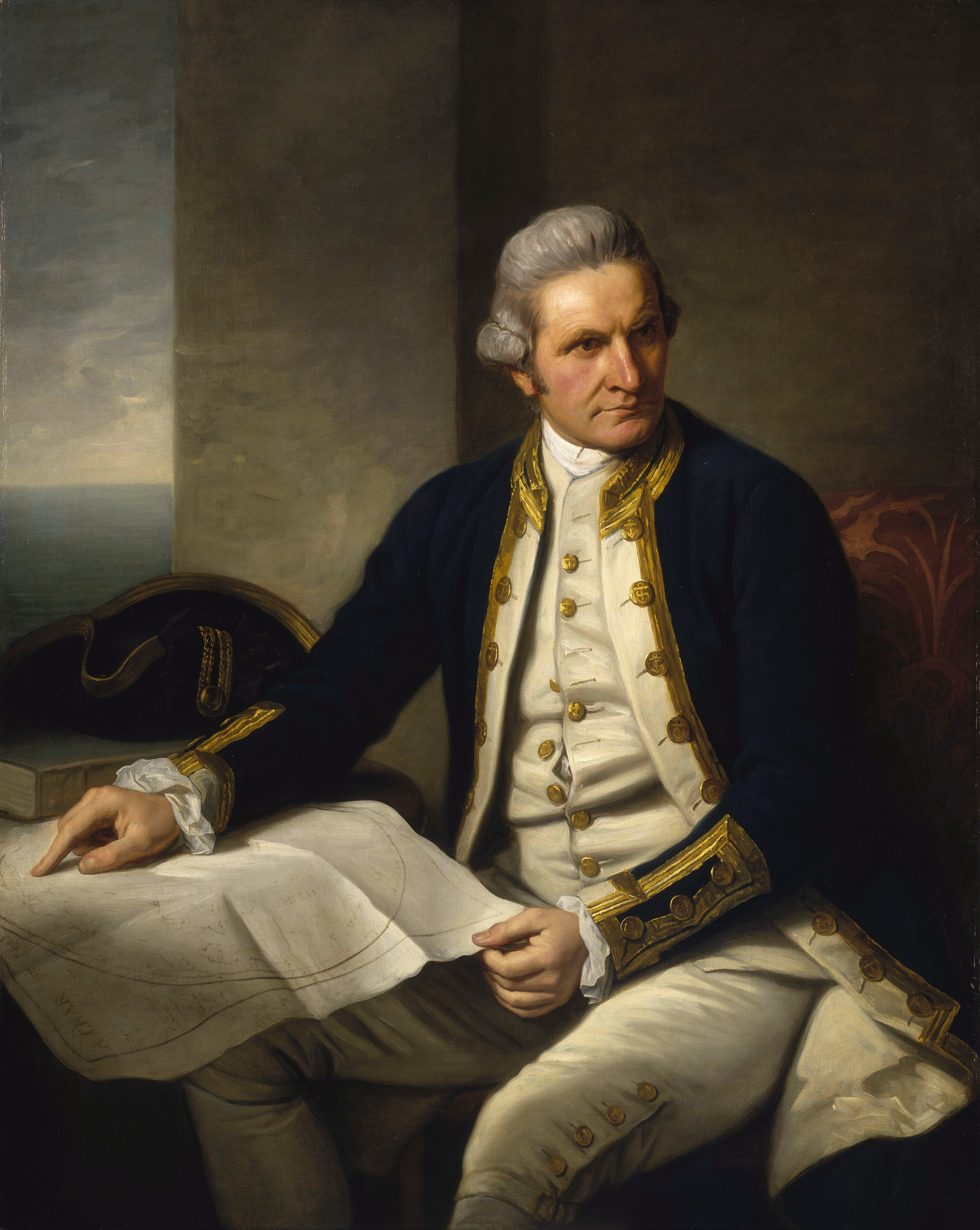
James Cook served as Solebay's master in 1757

With the Seven Years' War underway, Solebay was sent to serve on the east coast of Scotland to deter smuggling and defend against privateers. Captain Robert Craig replaced Fergussone on 4 January 1757. Whilst on a cruise in April, Solebay chased the French 10-gun privateer Chevalier Bart from the Firth of Forth to the River Tyne over thirty-six hours. Chevalier Bart threw her guns overboard in an attempt to escape, but surrendered on 24 April. The captured men were landed at Leith and imprisoned in Edinburgh Castle, the first prisoners of war to be held there. Solebay spent June and July on patrol from Leith to Cape Wrath, after which on 30 July James Cook joined the ship as her master. Solebay then commenced another patrol, leaving on 2 August and arriving at Lerwick a week later. After spending some time off Aberdeen, she returned to Leith on 30 August having searched only two vessels which were probably whalers travelling to Greenland. Cook left Solebay on 7 September.

Solebay was operating off the Firth of Forth on 26 May 1758, accompanying two ships with the 24-gun frigate HMS Dolphin. Off Red Head, Angus, they were attacked by the French 44-gun frigate Maréchal de Belleisle commanded by Commodore François Thurot, who had mistaken Solebay and Dolphin for merchant ships. The British vessels had at the time been searching for Thurot. Dolphin engaged Maréchal de Belleisle first, ninety minutes before Solebay could do the same, but fell back after receiving damage to her rigging. The French vessel fired high into the British ships, while in return Solebay and Dolphin fired at Maréchal de Belleisle's hull. After making repairs Dolphin supported Solebay's attacks on the French warship. The battle lasted for three and a half hours until, badly damaged, Thurot retreated towards Norway.

During the engagement Craig was shot in the throat by a musket ball, which possibly forced his retirement from the navy. Solebay had eighteen men killed and wounded, and according to a French account of the battle only stopped attacking when a fire started on board. Dolphin had a further sixteen casualties, while Maréchal de Belleisle had eighty. Both British ships had badly damaged rigging and masts and were unable to chase the Frenchman, choosing instead to return to Leith. The naval historian Jean-Claude Castex argues that the battle was unsuccessful for the British, as privateer attacks subsequently worsened.

Captain John Dalrymple took command of Solebay in October, and in the following year the ship formed part of Commodore Sir Peircy Brett's squadron on the Downs Station. Solebay encountered the French 18-gun privateer Chevrette on 31 January 1761 while patrolling off Calais alongside the 26-gun frigate HMS Amazon. The French vessel sought protection beneath a gun battery overlooking the cliffs, but Solebay and Amazon continued to chase, forcing Chevrette to run herself ashore. The crew surrendered and the privateer was floated off by her captors. On 3 July 1762 Dalrymple was replaced in command by Captain John Wilson. Cruising in what the naval historian Rif Winfield describes as "Home waters", Solebay served until the end of the war in 1763.

== Post-naval service ==
The ship was surveyed by the Admiralty on 16 February 1763 and sold at Woolwich Dockyard on 15 March to Charles Dingley. He kept the name Solebay and refitted the vessel as a merchant ship. On 22 February 1764 she was taken up by the British East India Company (EIC) to be stationed in Bengal and sailed on 29 May for Madagascar, Bencoolen, and India. In agreement with Dingley, Solebay would be sold locally when her EIC duties were completed. To Bencoolen Solebay brought recruits for the company's settlement and slaves purchased from Madagascar. She then sailed for Fort William, arriving there on 22 September 1765, where she embarked 117 sepoys to convey to Bombay. Solebay was last recorded as being sold to local Indian buyers in the same year.
