= James Compton, 5th Earl of Northampton =

British politician

James Compton, 5th Earl of Northampton (2 May 1687 – 3 October 1754), known as Lord Compton from 1687 to 1727, was a British peer and politician.

Northampton was the eldest son of George Compton, 4th Earl of Northampton, and his wife Jane (née Fox). He was educated at Eton College and travelled on the continent from 1707 to 1709.

He was elected to the House of Commons for Warwickshire in 1710, a seat he held until the following year, when he was summoned to the House of Lords through a writ of acceleration in his father's junior title of Baron Compton. He was one of "Harley's Dozen" elevated to the Lords to support the Tory government's peace plans against strong Whig opposition.

He succeeded his father in 1727 and his uncle Hon. Spencer Compton, 1st Earl of Wilmington, in 1743. From the latter, he inherited Compton Place in Eastbourne.

Lord Northampton married Elizabeth, 15th Baroness Ferrers of Chartley, in 1716. He had no surviving sons and was succeeded in the barony of Compton, which could be passed on through female lines, by his daughter Lady Charlotte, who also succeeded her mother in the barony of Ferrers of Chartley. The earldom was passed on to his younger brother George Compton, 6th Earl of Northampton.

In 1741, Northampton County, North Carolina was named for him.

== Notes ==
Parliament of Great Britain
Preceded by Sir John Mordaunt; Andrew Archer	Member of Parliament for Warwickshire; 1710–1711; With: Sir John Mordaunt	Succeeded by Sir John Mordaunt; Sir William Boughton
Peerage of England
Preceded by George Compton	Earl of Northampton; 5th creation 1727–1754	Succeeded by George Compton
Preceded by George Compton	Baron Compton (writ in acceleration); 1711–1754	Succeeded by Charlotte Townshend
