= Simon Digby =

Simon Digby may refer to:

== Politicians ==
- Simon Digby (died 1560), MP for Rutland
- Simon Digby, 4th Baron Digby (1657–1686), English nobleman and Member of Parliament
- Simon Wingfield Digby (1910–1998), British Conservative politician

== Others ==
- Simon Digby (died 1519), lord of Coleshill, Warwickshire, England
- Simon Digby (oriental scholar) (1932–2010), British oriental scholar, linguist and writer
- Simon Digby (bishop) (died 1720), Bishop of Limerick, Ardfert and Aghadoe; then Elphin
