= Robert Digby (Royal Navy officer) =

Royal Navy officer and politician (1732–1815)

Admiral Robert Digby
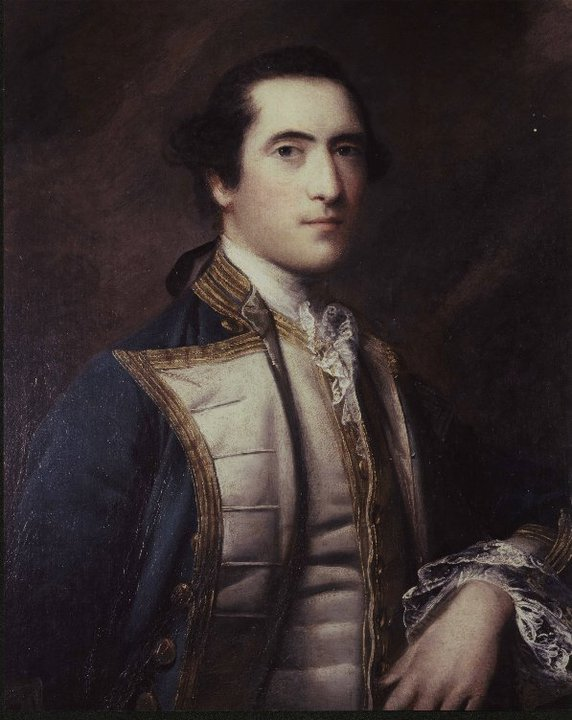
- c. 1783 portrait
- Born: 20 December 1732; Water Orton, Warwickshire
- Died: 25 February 1814 (aged 81)
- Military career
- Allegiance: Great Britain
- Branch: Royal Navy
- Service years: 1745–1794
- Rank: Admiral of the Blue
- Commands: HMS Solebay; HMS Dunkirk; HMS Trident; HMS Ramillies; HMS Prince George; North American Station
- Conflicts: Seven Years' War; Raid on Rochefort; Raid on St Malo; Capture of Gorée; Battle of Quiberon Bay; American War of Independence; Battle of Ushant (1778); Action of 8 January 1780; Battle of Cape St. Vincent (1780)

Admiral of the Blue Robert Digby (20 December 1732 – 25 February 1814) was a Royal Navy officer and politician who represented Wells in the House of Commons of Great Britain from 1757 to 1761. He is the namesake of Digby, Nova Scotia.

== Naval career ==
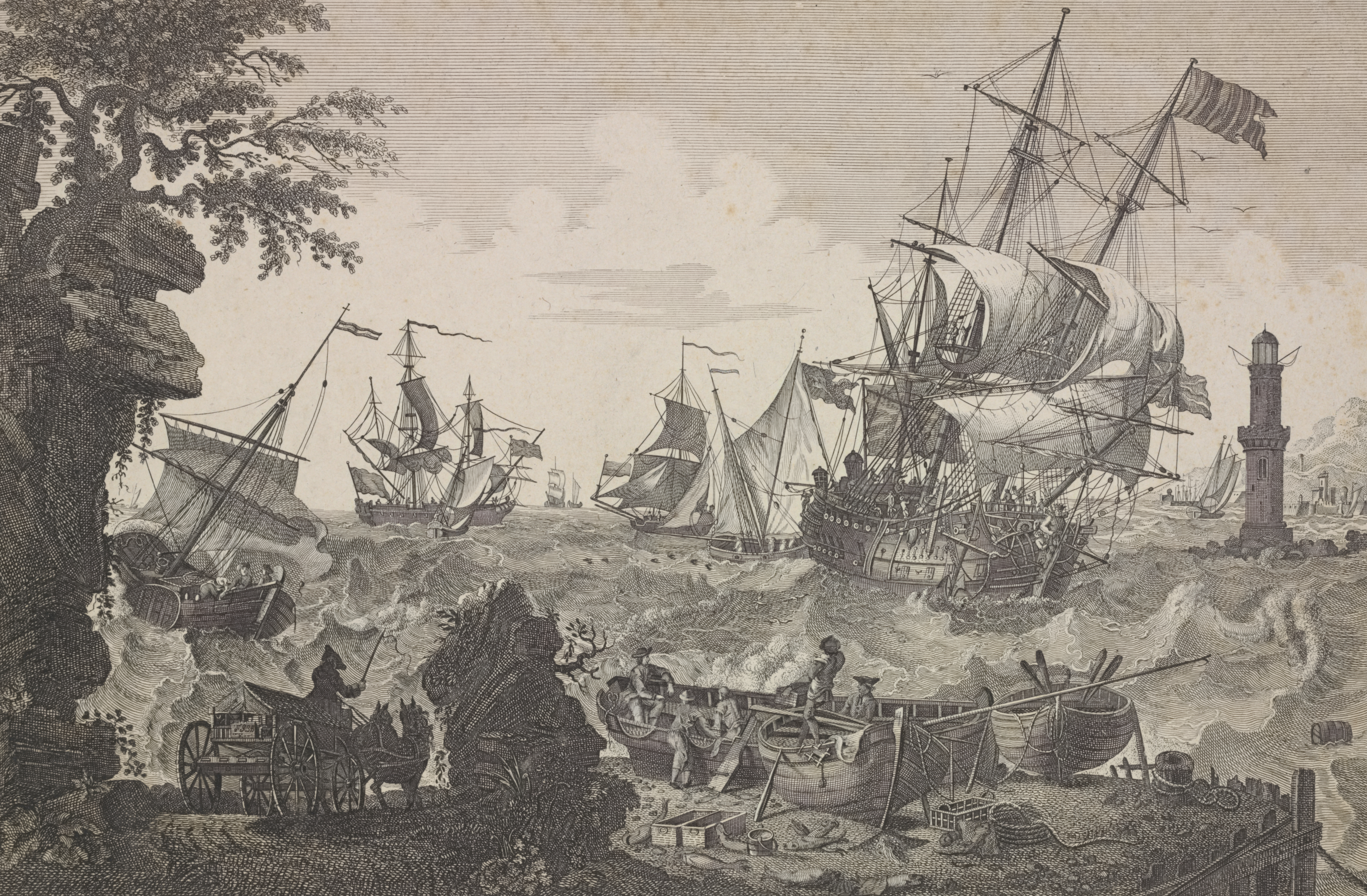
HMS Prince George under Digby arriving in New York City on 16 October 1781

Robert Digby was born in was the third son of Charlotte Fox and Edward Digby, the eldest son of William Digby, 5th Baron Digby. He joined the Royal Navy in 1745, and became captain of HMS Solebay at the age of 23 in 1755, and was present at the raid on Rochefort, raid on St Malo and capture of Gorée. Digby was also present at the Battle of Quiberon Bay as captain of HMS Dunkirk. He transferred to HMS Trident in March 1777, and the following month to HMS Ramillies, in which he was present at the Battle of Ushant.

Rising to Second-in-Command of the Channel Fleet in 1779, he was made Rear-Admiral of the Blue, and transferred to HMS Prince George, in which he was present at the action of 8 January 1780 and the Battle of Cape St. Vincent in January 1780. Digby was appointed in 1781 as Rear-Admiral of the Red and given the command of the North American Station.

After the surrender of New York City in 1783, Digby helped to organise the evacuation of some 1,500 United Empire Loyalists to the small port of Conway in Nova Scotia. The settlement he led transformed the tiny village into a town, which in 1787 was renamed Digby. The town's museum was also named the Admiral Digby Museum in his honor. He was recalled to home waters in 1787, was promoted to Admiral of the Blue, and retired from the navy in 1794.

== Family ==
His father died before inheriting the family's title, Baron Digby (in the peerage of Ireland), and on the death in 1752 of the 5th Baron, the title passed to the admiral's oldest brother Edward. When Edward died in 1757, the title was inherited by their brother Henry, and Robert was elected to succeed Edward as MP for Wells in Somerset, holding the seat from 1757 to 1761. (Because the family's title was in the peerage of Ireland, it did not confer a seat in the House of Lords, and did not disqualify the holder from election to the British House of Commons).

He married Eleanor Jauncey (née Elliot), daughter of Andrew Elliot, Lieutenant-Governor of New York. They had no children.

== Notes ==
Parliament of the United Kingdom
Preceded by Edward Digby and Charles Tudway	Member of Parliament for Wells; 1757–1761; With: Charles Tudway	Succeeded by Henry Digby and Clement Tudway
Military offices
Preceded by Sir Thomas Graves	Commander-in-Chief, North American Station; 1781–1783	Succeeded by Sir Charles Douglas
