= Henry Digby (Royal Navy officer) =

Royal Navy officer (1770–1842)

Admiral Sir Henry Digby GCB
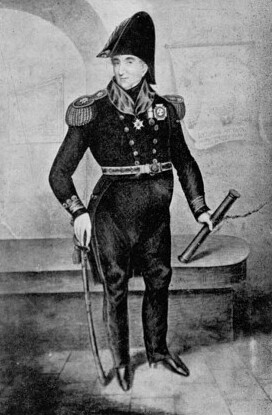
- Portrait of Digby
- Born: 20 January 1770; Bath, England
- Died: 19 August 1842 (aged 72); Sheerness, Kent, England
- Military career
- Allegiance: Great Britain; United Kingdom
- Branch: Royal Navy
- Rank: Admiral
- Commands: HMS Incendiary; HMS Aurora; HMS Leviathan; HMS Alcmene; HMS Resistance; HMS Africa; Nore Command
- Conflicts: French Revolutionary Wars; Napoleonic Wars
- Awards: Knight Grand Cross of the Order of the Bath

Admiral Sir Henry Digby GCB (20 January 1770 – 19 August 1842) was a Royal Navy officer who served in the French Revolutionary and Napoleonic Wars. Born into a long-established naval family, his uncle was Admiral Robert Digby. Digby went to sea at the end of the American Revolutionary War at the age fourteen.

As a lieutenant aboard HMS Pallas, he received a commendation for rescuing the crew of the burning HMS Boyne. Promoted to commander in August 1795 and captain in December 1796, Digby established a reputation as an aggressive prize taker, capturing 57 ships in less than twenty months. His richest capture came in the action of 16 October 1799 when he assisted in the taking of the Spanish frigate Santa Brigida. Digby commanded HMS Africa at the Battle of Trafalgar, manoeuvring her into the Franco-Spanish fleet against orders, having been instructed by Horatio Nelson to avoid battle, fearing Digby's small ship of the line would be overwhelmed.

In 1806, Digby married Lady Jane Elizabeth Coke, the daughter of Thomas Coke, 1st Earl of Leicester, with whom he had three children. They moved to the estate in Dorset inherited from his uncle where the prize money amassed by Digby paid for a comfortable life. He continued to serve in the navy, was appointed Commander in Chief, Sheerness and attained the rank of admiral in 1841.

== Early life ==
The nephew of Robert Digby, Henry was born in Bath on 20 January 1770. His father, the Hon. Rev. William Digby, was the younger brother of Edward Digby, 6th Baron Digby and later became Dean of Durham and Chaplain Ordinary to King George III. Henry was one of ten children and the oldest of four boys; two of whom, Charles George (1780) and Joseph (1786), also served in the Royal Navy. The younger, Joseph, later becoming a vice-admiral. On 2 April 1783, Henry was entered onto the muster roll of HMS Jason then HMS Vestal from 1 May till 6 March 1784 as a captain's servant. After a six-week break, on 16 April he was entered into the books of HMY Royal Charlotte until the end of the year when he finally went to sea aboard the 50-gun HMS Europa and sailed for the West Indies.

== Naval career ==
Digby was to spend the next two and half years aboard the Europa. He was almost immediately promoted from captain's servant to Able Seaman and shortly after, to Midshipman. On 4 July 1787, after a brief return to England, he was appointed, first to the Janus and then the Salisbury on the North American station. Digby's father died in November 1788 and he returned home but by December he was aboard the sloop Racehorse trying to stop the smuggling trade in the North Sea. He returned to England once more on 22 September 1789 and did not go to sea again until the following August during which time he passed his lieutenant's exam. After a short probationary period aboard HMS Bellerophon, he was confirmed as fourth lieutenant of the Lion in October 1790. Returning from the West Indies in September 1791, Digby spent a year and eight months in England dealing with family affairs, following the death of his mother.

On 5 May 1793, Digby was appointed first lieutenant of HMS Eurydice serving in the Channel Squadron, and from there to the Proserpine on 16 February 1794. Appointed second lieutenant to the 5th rate HMS Pallas on 25 March, he received a commendation for saving hundreds of lives when, on 1 May 1795, the 98-gun second-rate HMS Boyne caught fire and exploded in Spithead. Digby took a small boat close into the blazing ship to rescue men struggling in the water despite the risk of instant annihilation should the ammunition store catch alight, as happened later that day. Shortly after, on 20 May 1795, Digby joined HMS Dictator as first lieutenant and stayed with her until he was promoted in August that year.

=== First commands ===
In August 1795, Digby was promoted to commander of the 16 gun fireship, HMS Incendiary, operating in Quiberon Bay and the Channel. On 16 December 1796 he made Post Captain and was appointed to the 6th rate, 28 gun, Aurora, escorting convoys in the waters around Portugal and Spain and damaging the enemy's commercial interests wherever possible. In these first two commands, Digby took 57 enemy vessels before transferring to HMS Leviathan under Commodore John Duckworth and was present at the capture of Minorca in November 1798. In 1799 he was given a lucrative independent cruise in the frigate HMS Alcmene. Patrolling the waters in and around Portugal and the Azores, Digby captured dozens of small merchant ships and a 28 gun French privateer, Courageux.

Digby's habit of using his own funds to pay prize money to his crew straight away, rather than have to wait for a judgement from an Admiralty court; coupled with his aggressive, near-record-breaking prize taking; made him extremely popular with seamen and officers alike and he was never short of volunteers to sail with him. One particular capture, that of the Santa Brigida, contained such wealth that even an Ordinary Seaman received £182.

=== Capture of Santa Brigida ===
Digby claimed that a dream caused him to change course and as a result, at dawn on 16 October 1799, the Alcmene encountered two British frigates. HMS Naiad and HMS Ethalion were chasing two 34 gun Spanish frigates, Santa Brigida and Thetis. Digby's ship joined the pursuit and soon after a fourth frigate arrived. At 7.00am the two Spaniards parted company so Naiad followed one frigate, together with Alcmene and the newly arrived Triton, while Ethalion, set after the other frigate. By 11.30am, Ethalion had caught up with her quarry and after a short engagement the Spanish vessel struck her colours. Ethalion had no casualties though the Spaniards had one man killed and nine wounded. Triton, the fastest of the three British frigates, led the chase of the second frigate. The next morning Triton struck some rocks off Muros as she tried to prevent her quarry from reaching port. Triton got off the rocks and resumed the chase despite taking on water. She and Alcmene then exchanged fire with the Spanish frigate, which surrendered before Naiad could catch up.

The Santa Brigida and Thetis cargoes included around 2.7 million Pieces of Eight. The two ships' cargoes totalled around £618,000 (£56million in 2018 values) and Digby's share of the prize fund came to £40,731, not including the ships themselves. This was more than twice the total prize money Digby had thus far accrued in his career (around £20,000).

=== Peace ===
Digby returned to England in early 1801 and spent 10 weeks without a ship. In May he took command of HMS Resistance, on the North American station, in which he captured the French privateer Elizabeth, the last capture before the Peace of Amiens. Digby spent the next three years on half pay, though in February 1805 he was in temporary command of HMS Leda. He was next given command of HMS Africa in July 1805. An old, small battleship, Africa possessed just 64 guns and was considered by many as much too small to serve in the line of battle in a major fleet engagement. Ordered to join Nelson's fleet off Cadiz, Digby arrived just days before the Battle of Trafalgar on 21 October.

=== Trafalgar ===
Africa, off station, complies with Nelson's order to rejoin the fleet by setting a course parallel to the enemy van.

The Africa was also a poor sailer, and on the morning of the battle, as a result of bad weather and a missed signal during the night, Digby found his ship far off station to the north and was thus very isolated. Nelson saw the predicament and sent a signal instructing Digby to "Make all sail", intending him to pull back from the enemy rather than risk being overwhelmed as there were ten enemy ships between Africa and the British fleet, all larger than Africa in size.

Digby indignantly received the order and then deliberately misinterpreted it as an instruction to close with the British fleet to the south, engaging each in turn with port broadsides before reaching the melee surrounding the enormous Spanish flagship, the 130 gun Santissima Trinidad. Believing that she had surrendered, Digby dispatched his first lieutenant, John Smith, on board to take the surrender. Smith and his party actually reached the Spanish quarterdeck unmolested before realising that the ship was still fighting. Fortunately in that chivalrous age the Spanish admiral allowed Smith's party to return to their boat unharmed. Sailing south from the battle, Africa encountered the Intrépide and fought her continuously for 40 minutes until HMS Orion arrived and the French ship surrendered as she was outnumbered. In this fight Africa was very badly damaged and lost 62 men killed or wounded, including most of her officers.

The damage suffered by the Africa was highlighted in March 2006 when the BBC television programme Antiques Roadshow examined a book that was extensively damaged by a cannonball. Digby's inscription inside read ... this book was shivered in this manner by a whole shot, knocking to pieces the bookcase ... off Cape Trafalgar on 21 October 1805 ... on board the 'Africa' (64 guns). signed Henry Digby.

Some 10 years after the battle, Digby received some criticisms for his actions. On hearing a rumour that Nelson had disapproved of Digby's behaviour at Trafalgar, Hardy wrote: ".....I beg to assure you that Lord Nelson expressed great satisfaction at the gallant manner in which you passed the enemy's line; and I assure you he appeared most fully satisfied with the conduct of the Africa. I shall be most happy personally to contradict the report, if you will inform me of the Captain's name who conveyed it to you".

== Later life ==
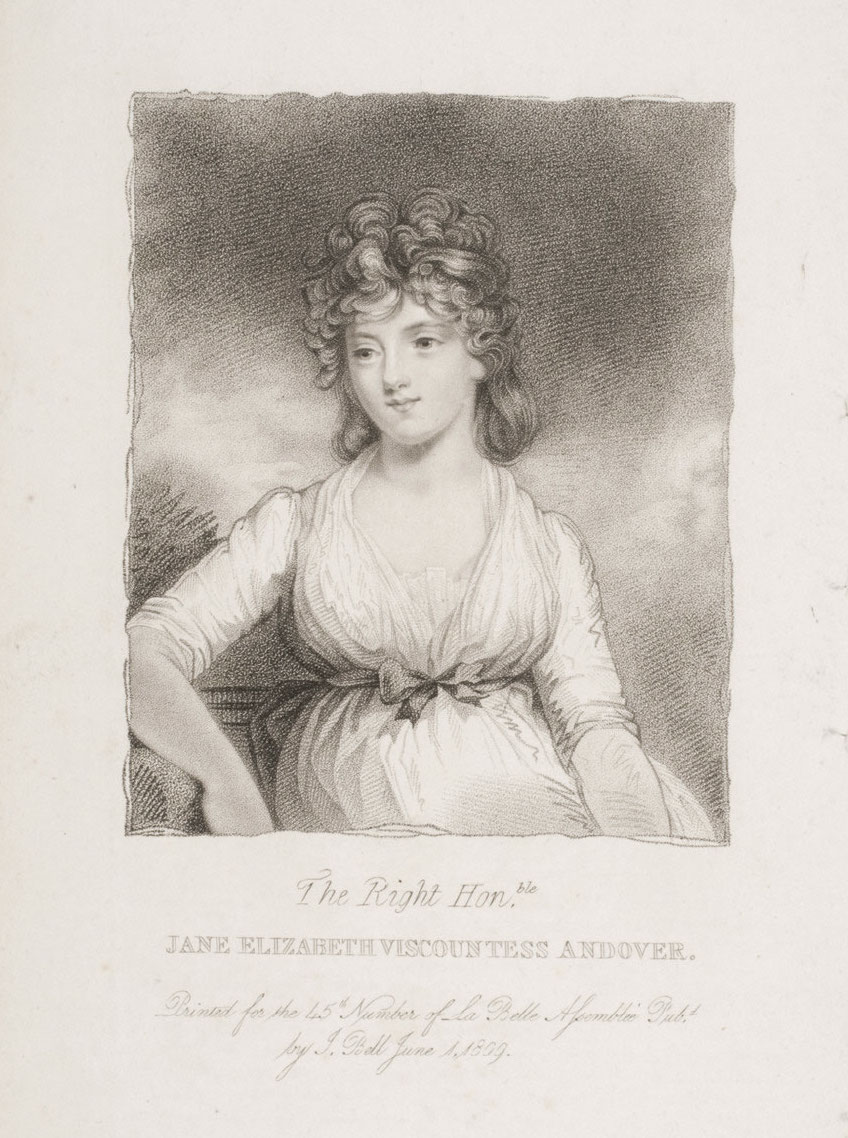
Lady Jane Elizabeth Coke, widow of Charles Nevison Howard, Viscount Andover

On 17 April 1806, he married Lady Jane Elizabeth Coke, a renowned beauty, and daughter of Thomas Coke, 1st Earl of Leicester. They had three children, the eldest son, Edward St Vincent, born 1809, became the 9th Baron Digby in 1856. Their daughter, born in 1807, was the scandalous adventuress, Jane Digby. Their youngest child, Rev. Hon. Kenelm Henry Digby, held the office of rector of Tittleshall, and Honorary Canon of Norwich.

For his role at Trafalgar, Digby received a further £973 prize money and a proportion of a government grant amounting £2389 7s 6d, which together with the money accumulated from earlier successes paid for a large manor and a very comfortable life. In 1815 his uncle, Admiral Robert Digby, died leaving Henry the estate in Minterne Magna to which he retired with his family. Digby did not leave the Royal Navy, however, and continued to serve for many years, advancing by seniority through the ranks, making rear admiral^{[a]} in 1819 and vice admiral in 1830.^{[c]} He received the Order of the Bath in 1815 and served as High Sheriff of Dorset in 1835. ^{[b]} Digby was appointed Commander-in-Chief, The Nore, in 1840.

He suffered from bouts of gout in his final years and died in 1842 and was buried in the local churchyard with many of his family, where his tombstone can still be seen. At the time of his death he was a full admiral of the Blue ^{[d]} and had become a Knight Grand Cross of the Order of the Bath^{[e]}

Henry's great-great-granddaughter was the 20th-century socialite and diplomat Pamela Harriman, who grew up on the family estate in Dorset.

== Notes ==
a Rear Admiral of the Blue 12 August 1819, of the Red 27 May 1825

b 2 January 1815

c Vice Admiral of the Blue 22 July 1830, of the White 10 January 1837

d 22 July 1830

e 23 November 1841

== Bibliography ==
- Heathcote, T.A. (2005). Nelson's Trafalgar Captains and Their Battles. Barnsley, Yorks.: Pen and Sword Books. ISBN 1-84415-182-4.
- James, William (1837). The Naval History of Great Britain. Archived from the original on 2 July 2008.
- Broadley, A. M.; Bartelot, R.G. (1906). The Three Dorset Captains at Trafalgar — Thomas Masterman, Carles Bullen, Henry Digby. Wimborne: The Dovecote Press.
- The Trafalgar Captains, Colin White and the 1805 Club, Chatham Publishing, London, 2005, ISBN 1-86176-247-X

Military offices
| Preceded by Sir Robert Otway | Commander-in-Chief, The Nore; 1840–1841 | Succeeded by Sir Edward Brace |
Honorary titles
| Preceded by Edward Doughty of Upton | High Sheriff of Dorset; 1835 | Succeeded by John Stein of Chalmington |
