= Andrew Archer (1659–1741) =

English politician

Andrew Archer (2 August 1659 – 31 December 1741), of Umberslade Hall, Tanworth in Arden, Warwickshire was a British landowner and Tory politician who sat in the House of Commons in three periods between 1690 and 1722.

== Early life ==
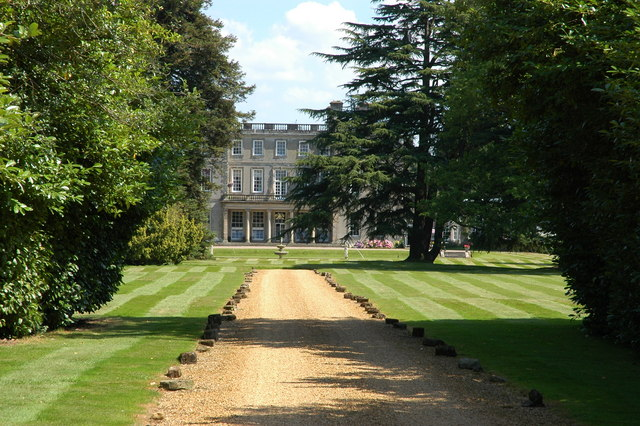
Umberslade Hall

Archer was baptized on 2 August 1659, the eldest son of Thomas Archer of Umberslade, Warwickshire and his wife Anne Leigh, daughter of Richard Leigh of London. His father had been a parliamentary commander during the Civil War. He matriculated at Trinity College, Oxford on 3 May 1678, aged 18; and was admitted at Inner Temple in 1680. Upon his father's death in 1685 he inherited Umberslade. He married Elizabeth Dashwood, daughter of Sir Samuel Dashwood by licence of 15 June 1693. His wife was connected to Fulke Greville, 5th Lord Brooke, a leading Warwickshire Tory. and the marriage brought him into contact with the world of finance.

== Career ==
Archer was returned in a contest as Member of Parliament for Warwickshire at the 1690 English general election but was relatively inactive. He became a Commissioner for rebuilding Warwick in 1695 and was returned in a contest again at the 1695 English general election. At first he refused to subscribe the Association. He voted against fixing the price of guineas in March 1696, and voted against the attainder of Sir John Fenwick on 25 November 1696. In 1697, he introduced and managed a bill to empower magistrates to order that highways be widened. He did not stand at the 1698 English general election and spent the next few years to 1700 rebuilding Umberslade. In 1700 he became deputy lieutenant. He maintained his interest in political affairs in London and Warwickshire, but did not stand for Parliament again until asked to fill the gap at a by-election for Warwickshire on 28 November 1705. He was returned unopposed as a Tory and was active in Parliament. At the 1708 British general election, he was returned unopposed as Tory MP for Warwickshire. He was a teller for the Tories on several occasions and saw through a bill for a new church at Birmingham. He was active in the matter of Dr Sacheverell and voted against the impeachment proceedings in 1710. He decided not to stand at the 1710 British general election, but in 1711 was appointed Commissioner in the inquiry into forces and garrisons in Spain, Portugal and Italy. He spent two years in constant travel and uncovered many fraudulent practices in Spain. However he felt his efforts were unappreciated and was disappointed to receive no reward. At the 1713 British general election he was invited to stand by the Warwickshire gentry and was returned unopposed as Tory MP for Warwickshire again. He was teller for the Tories a few times but was noted as voting with the Whigs on occasion.

Archer was returned again at the 1715 British general election, and supported the opposition until he stood down at the 1722 British general election.

== Later life and legacy ==
Archer became increasingly indebted, having borrowed to purchase another manor in 1716. He appeared to have devoted his efforts to building a library. He died on 31 December 1741 at Umberslade. His children were:

- Diana Archer, who married Thomas Chaplin
- Thomas Archer, 1st Baron Archer (1695–1768)
- Henry Archer (1700–1768), married Elizabeth Montagu, sister of George Montagu, 1st Earl of Halifax
- Anne Archer
- Elizabeth Archer
- Sarah Archer

Archer's sons Thomas and Henry were both returned to Parliament in 1735.

Parliament of England
Preceded by Sir Richard Verney; Sir Richard Newdigate	Member of Parliament for Warwickshire; 1690–1698; With: William Bromley	Succeeded by Sir Charles Shuckburgh; Sir John Mordaunt
Preceded by Sir John Mordaunt; Sir Charles Shuckburgh	Member of Parliament for Warwickshire; 1705–1707; With: Sir John Mordaunt	Succeeded by Parliament of Great Britain
Parliament of Great Britain
Preceded by Parliament of England	Member of Parliament for Warwickshire; 1707–1710; With: Sir John Mordaunt	Succeeded by Sir John Mordaunt; Lord Compton
Preceded by Sir John Mordaunt; Sir William Boughton	Member of Parliament for Warwickshire; 1713–1722; With: Sir John Mordaunt 1713–1715; William Peyto 1715–1722	Succeeded by William Peyto; Robert Digby
