= Sir John Mordaunt, 5th Baronet =

English Tory politician

Sir John Mordaunt, 5th Baronet (by 1649 – 6 September 1721) of Walton d'Eiville was an English Tory politician who sat in the English and British House of Commons from 1698 to 1715.

Mordaunt was the second son of Sir Charles Mordaunt, 3rd Baronet and his wife Catherine Tollemache, daughter of Sir Lionel Tollemache, 2nd Baronet, of Helmingham, Suffolk. He succeeded his elder brother to the baronetcy on 24 April 1665 and inherited the Massingham Estate at Little Massingham, Norfolk. Mordaunt was one of Warwickshire's two deputy-lieutenants and following the Rye House Plot was involved in organising arms searches in Warwickshire's main towns in 1683.

He married by licence dated 13 June 1678, aged 21, Anne Risley, daughter of William Risley of the Friary, Bedford. She died in 1692 and he married as his second wife, by licence dated 8 June 1695, Penelope Warburton, the daughter of Sir George Warburton, 3rd Baronet, of Arley, Cheshire.

Mordaunt was returned as Member of Parliament for Warwickshire at the 1698 English general election. He held the seat until 1715.

Mordaunt died at Kensington on 6 September 1721. He left two sons and two surviving daughters by his second wife, Penelope, and was succeeded by his eldest son, Sir Charles Mordaunt, 6th Baronet.

Parliament of England
Preceded by William Bromley; Andrew Archer	Member of Parliament for Warwickshire; 1698–1707; With: Sir Charles Shuckburgh 1698–1705; Andrew Archer 1705–1707	Succeeded by Parliament of Great Britain
Parliament of Great Britain
Preceded by Parliament of England	Member of Parliament for Warwickshire; 1707–1715; With: Andrew Archer 1707–1710, 1713–1715; Lord Compton 1710–1712; Sir William Boughton 1712–1713	Succeeded by Andrew Archer; William Peyto
Baronetage of England
Preceded by Charles Mordaunt	Baronet (of Massingham Parva); 1665–1721	Succeeded by Charles Mordaunt
