= Kildare Digby, 2nd Baron Digby =

Irish nobleman

Kildare Digby, 2nd Baron Digby (c. 1627 – 11 July 1661), was an Irish nobleman.

Kildare was a minor when he succeeded his father, Robert Digby, 1st Baron Digby, in 1642. Upon the English Restoration, he sat in the Irish House of Lords in the Parliament of 1661, and was appointed Governor of Kings County, like his father. However, he died at Dublin in July. By his wife Mary (d. 23 December 1692), the daughter of Robert Gardiner of London, he had four sons and three daughters:

- Hon. Robert Digby (22 April 1653 – 11 July 1653)
- Hon. Elizabeth Digby, died young
- Hon. Mary Digby, died young
- Robert Digby, 3rd Baron Digby (1654–1677)
- Simon Digby, 4th Baron Digby (1657–1685)
- William Digby, 5th Baron Digby (1661–1752)
- Hon. Lettice Digby, married Charles Cotes, of Woodcote Hall

He was buried at St Patrick's Cathedral, Dublin, and his widow and children afterwards lived at the Digby estate of Coleshill, Warwickshire, where she erected a monument to him.

Coat of arms of Kildare Digby, 2nd Baron Digby
Crest An ostrich, holding in the beak a horse-shoe all proper. Escutcheon Azure, a fleur-de-lis argent Supporters On either side a monkey proper environed about the middle and lined or. Motto DEO NON FORTUNA (From God not chance)

Peerage of Ireland
Preceded by Robert Digby	Baron Digby; 1642–1661	Succeeded by Robert Digby
