= Edward Digby, 9th Baron Digby =

British peer (1809–1889)

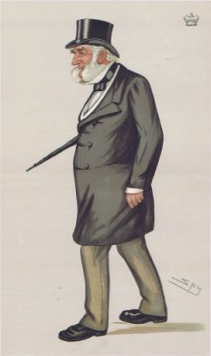
"Lord Leicester's nephew" Digby as caricatured by Spy (Leslie Ward) in Vanity Fair, September 1883

Edward St Vincent Digby, 9th Baron Digby (21 June 1809 – 16 October 1889), also 3rd Baron Digby in the Peerage of Great Britain, was a British peer.

== Biography ==
Digby was the son of Admiral Sir Henry Digby, who fought at the Battle of Trafalgar, and Lady Jane Elizabeth Coke, daughter of Thomas Coke, 1st Earl of Leicester. Jane Digby was his sister. He was commissioned a captain in the Dorsetshire Yeomanry on 12 November 1848. On 12 May 1856 he succeeded as ninth Baron Digby (in the Peerage of Ireland) and third Baron Digby (in the Peerage of Great Britain) on the death of his first cousin once removed, Edward Digby, 2nd Earl Digby (on whose death the earldom became extinct), and was able to take a seat in the House of Lords. On 26 July 1856, he was promoted to lieutenant-colonel in the Yeomanry, and on 19 July 1866, succeeded Lord Rivers as lieutenant-colonel commandant of the regiment. He resigned the command in 1870. Lord Digby died suddenly on 16 October 1889 at his home, Minterne House in Dorset of a stroke, he was later buried in St. Andrew's Church, Minterne.

== Personal life ==
Lord Digby married his third cousin Lady Theresa Anna Maria Fox-Strangways, daughter of Henry Fox-Strangways, 3rd Earl of Ilchester, in 1837. He died in October 1889, aged 80, and was succeeded in his titles by his eldest son, Edward Henry Trafalgar Digby. Lord Digby's great-granddaughter was the Hon. Pamela Digby, American Ambassador to France. Lord and Lady Digby had three daughters and four sons:

- Hon. Victoria Alexandrina Digby (1840 – 21 May 1917), married Richard Marker, eldest son of Reverend Thomas John Marker and Frances Drewe
- Hon. Leonora Caroline Digby (8 November 1844 – 19 August 1930), married Alexander Baring, 4th Baron Ashburton
- Edward Henry Trafalgar Digby, 10th Baron Digby (21 October 1846 – 11 May 1920), married Emily Hood (daughter of Hon. Albert Hood, second son of Samuel Hood-Tibbits, 3rd Viscount Hood)
- Hon. Mary Theresa Digby (3 January 1848 – 12 October 1896), married Major William Charles James (younger son of Colonel Sir Philip James of Dorset and Susan Georgiana Ryder, daughter of Hon. Granville Ryder)
- Hon. Almarus Kenelm Digby (5 September 1850 – 13 December 1886), died unmarried of typhoid fever
- Colonel Hon. Everard Charles Digby (6 September 1852 – 16 January 1915), married Lady Emily FitzMaurice, daughter of Henry Petty-FitzMaurice, 4th Marquess of Lansdowne
- Captain Hon. Gerald FitzMaurice Digby (20 December 1858 – 8 December 1942), married Lady Lillian Liddell, daughter of Henry Liddell, 2nd Earl of Ravensworth

== Ancestry ==
Ancestors of Edward Digby, 9th Baron Digby

William Digby, 5th Baron Digby
Hon. Edward Digby
Lady Jane Noel
Hon. Rev. William Digby
Sir Stephen Fox
Charlotte Fox
Christiana Hope
Admiral Sir Henry Digby
Joseph Cox
Joseph Cox
Judith Gardiner
Charlotte Cox
John Sheffield, 1st Duke of Buckingham and Normanby
Katherine Herbert
Frances Stewart
Edward Digby, 9th Baron Digby
Major Philip Roberts
Wenman Coke
Anne Coke
Thomas Coke, 1st Earl of Leicester
George Chamberlayne
Elizabeth Chamberlayne
Constance Hardy
Lady Jane Coke
James Napier
James Dutton
Anne Dutton
Jane Dutton
Christopher Bond
Jane Bond
Jane Whorwood

== Coat of arms ==
Coat of arms of Edward Digby, 9th Baron Digby
Crest An ostrich, holding in the beak a horse-shoe all proper. Escutcheon Azure, a fleur-de-lis argent Supporters On either side a monkey proper environed about the middle and lined or. Motto DEO NON FORTUNA (From God not chance)

== Notes ==
Military offices
Preceded by The Lord Rivers	Lieutenant-Colonel Commandant of the Dorsetshire Yeomanry (Queen's Own); 1866–1870	Succeeded by Lord Richard Grosvenor
Peerage of Ireland
Preceded by Edward Digby	Baron Digby; 1856–1889	Succeeded by Edward Henry Trafalgar Digby
Peerage of Great Britain
Preceded by Edward Digby	Baron Digby; 1856–1889	Succeeded by Edward Henry Trafalgar Digby
