= Robert Digby, 3rd Baron Digby =

Irish peer and English Member of Parliament

Coat of arms of Robert Digby, 3rd Baron Digby
Crest An ostrich, holding in the beak a horse-shoe all proper. Escutcheon Azure, a fleur-de-lis argent Supporters On either side a monkey proper environed about the middle and lined or. Motto DEO NON FORTUNA (From God not chance)

Robert Digby, 3rd Baron Digby (30 April 1654 – 29 December 1677), was an Irish peer and English Member of Parliament.

Digby was the son of Kildare Digby, 2nd Baron Digby, and Mary Gardiner. In 1661, aged 7, he succeeded his father as third Baron Digby. Mary did not remarry, and arranged for the education of her children by a clergyman, William Rawlins. He matriculated at Magdalen College, Oxford, on 6 November 1670, travelled on the Continent from 1673 to 1676, and received his Master of Arts on 11 July 1676. When Fulke Greville, 5th Baron Brooke, succeeded to the peerage in 1677 and vacated his seat for Warwick, he supported Digby to succeed him at the ensuing by-election, which occurred in May, without opposition. Digby was also appointed a commissioner of assessment for Warwickshire. He was accounted a member of the Country Party, but never took his seat, as he died on 29 December of that year. Digby was buried at the family estate of Coleshill, Warwickshire, and was succeeded by his younger brother Simon.

Parliament of England
Preceded by Hon. Fulke Greville; Sir Francis Compton	Member of Parliament for Warwick; 1677; With: Sir Francis Compton	Succeeded by Sir Francis Compton; Sir John Bowyer, Bt
Peerage of Ireland
Preceded by Kildare Digby	Baron Digby; 1661–1677	Succeeded by Simon Digby
