= Kenelm Digby (disambiguation) =

Sir Kenelm Digby (1603–1665) was an English courtier, diplomat and Roman Catholic intellectual.

Kenelm Digby may also refer to:

- Kenelm Digby (Rutland MP) (died 1590), English MP and High Sheriff
- Kenelm Henry Digby (c. 1800–1880), Anglo-Irish writer
- Kenelm Edward Digby (1836–1916), English lawyer and civil servant
- Kenelm Thomas Digby (1840–1893), Member of Parliament for Queen's County, 1868–1880
- Kenelm Hutchinson Digby (1884–1954), Emeritus Professor of Surgery, University of Hong Kong
- Kenelm George Digby (1890–1944), Puisne Judge of the High Court of Judicature at Nagpur, India
- Kenelm Simon Wingfield Digby (1910–1998), British Conservative politician
- Kenelm Hubert Digby (1912–2001), proposer of the notorious 1933 "King and Country" debate and later Attorney General and judge in Sarawak and civil servant in New Zealand
