= Robert Digby (died 1726) =

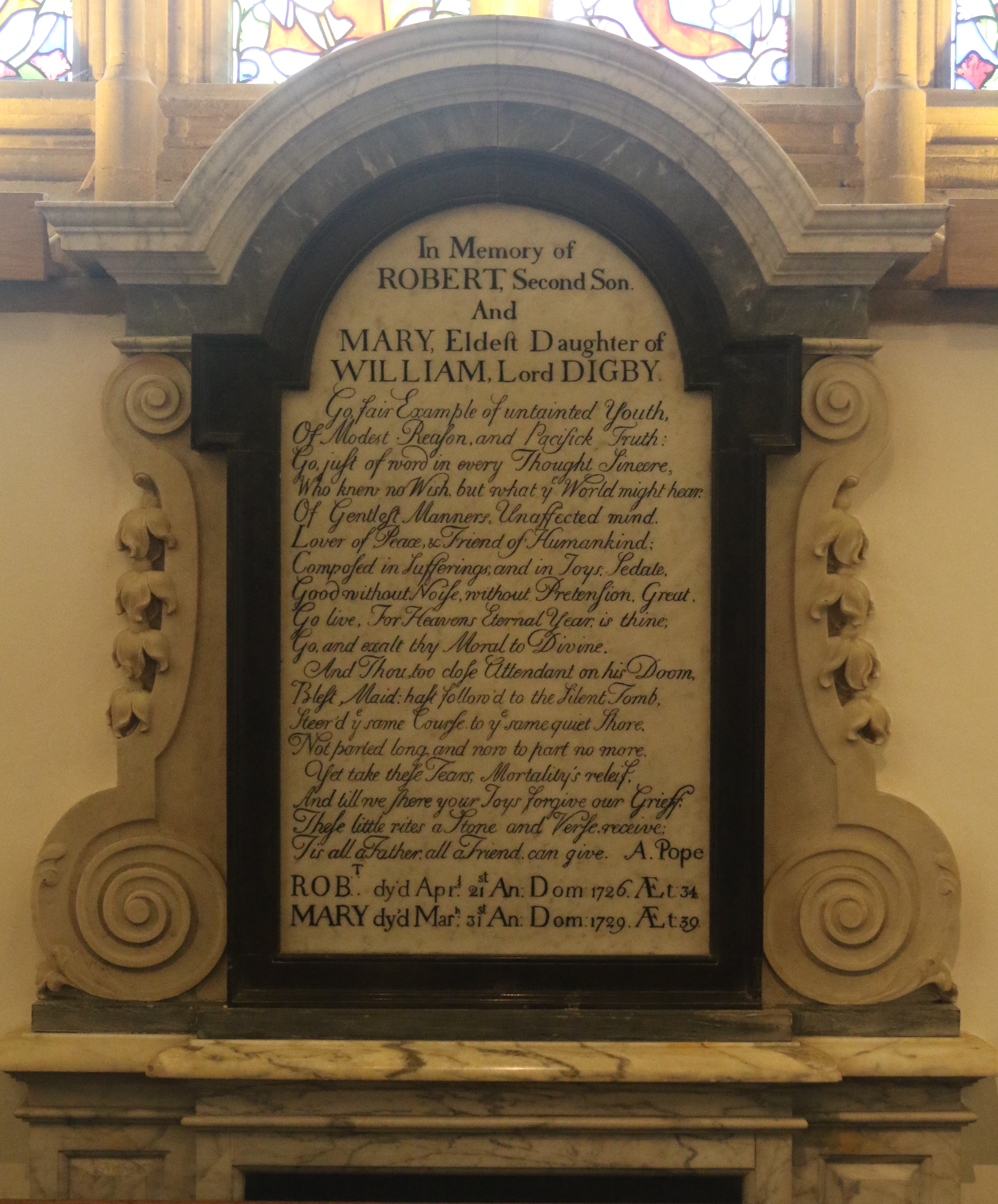
Memorial in Sherborne Abbey

Robert Digby (c. 1692 – 19 April 1726) was the second son of William Digby, 5th Baron Digby, and represented Warwickshire in the British House of Commons for part of the 1720s.

He matriculated at Magdalen College, Oxford, on 12 July 1708 and received his MA on 12 October 1711.

He was returned unopposed as a Tory as Member of Parliament for Warwickshire in the 1722 election. Not known to have spoken in Parliament, he regularly recorded debates for the benefit of his father. He suffered from poor health, and died unmarried on 19 April 1726. He was buried at the family estate of Sherborne Castle. Alexander Pope, a friend, wrote his epitaph.

Parliament of Great Britain
Preceded by Andrew Archer; William Peyto	Member of Parliament for Warwickshire; 1722–1726; With: William Peyto	Succeeded by William Peyto; Hon. Edward Digby
