= John Digby =

John Digby may refer to:

- Sir John Digby (died 1533), Knight Marshal for Henry VIII
- John Digby (died 1548) (1508–1548), MP for Leicestershire 1539, High Sheriff of Warwickshire and Leicestershire 1539–40
- John Digby, 1st Earl of Bristol (1580–1653), English diplomat and Royalist
- John Digby, 3rd Earl of Bristol (1635–1698), MP for Dorset 1675–1677
- John Digby (1618–1664), MP for Milborne Port in 1640
- John Digby (1668–1728), MP for Newark 1705–08 and MP for East Retford 1713–22
- John Digby (judge) (born 1951), Australian lawyer and judge
- John Digby (Irish politician) (1691–1786), Irish politician
- John Wingfield Digby (1859–1904), English landowner and MP for Mid Somerset 1885, MP for North Dorset 1892–1904
