= Simon Digby, 4th Baron Digby =

Irish peer and English Member of Parliament

Simon Digby, 4th Baron Digby (18 July 1657 – 19 January 1686), was an Irish peer and English Member of Parliament.

== Early life ==
Digby was a younger son of Kildare Digby, 2nd Baron Digby, and Mary Gardiner. He was privately educated by a clergyman, William Rawlins, at the family estate of Coleshill, Warwickshire, before matriculating on 1 July 1674 at Magdalen College, Oxford. He was admitted to Lincoln's Inn in 1676, and succeeded his elder brother, Robert, as Baron Digby in December 1677.

== Political career ==
At the October 1679 election, Digby stood as a court candidate for Coventry, but was outpolled by all the other candidates. From 1679 to 1680, he was a commissioner of assessment for Warwickshire, and a deputy lieutenant of the county from 1680 on. A devout and scrupulous man (he rarely gambled, and donated any winnings to the poor), he took particular pains in exercising the advowson of Coleshill. He ultimately appointed John Kettlewell, then known as the author of The Measures of Christian Obedience, to the vicariate there in December 1682.

== Marriage and issue ==
On 27 August 1683, he married Lady Frances Noel, daughter of Edward Noel, 1st Earl of Gainsborough, and Lady Elizabeth Wriothesley (herself daughter of Thomas Wriothesley, 4th Earl of Southampton). They had one daughter; Lady Digby died in childbirth, and was buried at Coleshill on 4 October.

- Hon. Frances Digby (29 September 1684 – 3 May 1729), married James Scudamore, 3rd Viscount Scudamore, and had one daughter.

== Later life ==
At the 1685 election, he was returned as Member of Parliament for Warwick, presumably, like his elder brother, with the support of Lord Brooke. He was quite active in Parliament, serving on several committees, and was so strenuous and effective a speaker against a standing army as to be numbered among the opposition, and named to the committee which wrote the address against employing Roman Catholic officers. However, this activity was not long to continue: Digby died on 19 January 1685/6 at Coleshill, and was buried there. Kettlewell preached his funeral sermon, as he had for Lady Digby. Digby was succeeded in the barony by his younger brother William. Digby left an endowment for a school and almshouses in Coleshill.

Coat of arms of Simon Digby, 4th Baron Digby
Crest An ostrich, holding in the beak a horse-shoe all proper. Escutcheon Azure, a fleur-de-lis argent Supporters On either side a monkey proper environed about the middle and lined or. Motto DEO NON FORTUNA (From God not chance)

Parliament of England
Preceded by Thomas Lucy; Thomas Coventry	Member of Parliament for Warwick; 1685–1686	Succeeded by Thomas Coventry; William Colemore
Peerage of Ireland
Preceded by Robert Digby	Baron Digby; 1677–1686	Succeeded by William Digby
