= HMS Prince George =

Four ships of the Royal Navy have been named HMS Prince George:

- HMS Prince George (1701) was a 90-gun second-rate ship of the line. She was launched in 1682 as HMS Duke but was rebuilt and renamed in 1701 after the future George II of Great Britain. She was rebuilt again in 1723 but was accidentally burnt at sea in 1758.
- HMS Prince George was a cutter purchased in 1763 and sold in 1771.
- HMS Prince George (1772) was a 98-gun second-rate launched in 1772 and named after the future George IV of the United Kingdom. She was converted to a sheer hulk in 1832 and was broken up in 1839.
- HMS Prince George (1895) was a Majestic-class pre-dreadnought battleship launched in 1895 and named after the future George V of the United Kingdom. She was used for harbour service from 1918 and was renamed Victorious II. She foundered in 1921 on her way to be broken up.
