= Lettice Digby =

Lettice Digby may refer to:

- Lettice Digby, 1st Baroness Offaly (c. 1580–1658), Irish noblewoman
- Lettice Digby (scientist) (1877–1972), British cytologist, botanist and malacologist
