= Digby Willoughby =

Digby Willoughby may refer to:

- Digby Willoughby, 7th Baron Middleton (1769–1856)
- Digby Willoughby (adventurer) (1845–1901), English mercenary
- Digby Wentworth Bayard Willoughby, 9th Baron Middleton (1844–1922)
- Digby Willoughby (bobsleigher), Lieutenant Colonel Digby Willoughby, (1934–2007)
- Michael Willoughby, 12th Baron Middleton, real name Digby Willoughby, (b. 1921)
- Digby Willoughby (Conservative politician), Lord Mayor of Hull, and figure of the 1946 corruption scandal
