= Grace Digby =

British artist (1895–1964)

- Born: 1895; Scarborough, North Yorkshire
- Died: 1964 (aged 68–69)
- Occupations: Artist, jewellery designer

Grace Digby (1895–1964) was a British artist, notable as a landscape painter and jewellery designer.

== Biography ==
Digby was born at Scarborough in North Yorkshire and studied in Brussels. She was educated at the Brussels Academie and Conservatoire and also studied painting at the atelier of Blanc Garin. During her career, Digby made jewellery, painted landscapes in both oils and watercolours and designed posters. She was also a talented violinist, and won medals in competitions in Brussels and Tournai.

Digby exhibited at the Royal Academy in London, at the Walker Art Gallery in Liverpool, with the Royal Cambrian Academy and also in Europe, the United States and in Australia. Between 1948 and 1964 she was a regular exhibitor with the Society of Women Artists and was a full member of the Society from 1961.

Digby lived in Birmingham during her adult life and exhibited with both the Royal Birmingham Society of Artists and the Birmingham Art Circle and also had a solo exhibition in the city during 1925. The Imperial War Museum has her oil painting, After the Shelling, Louvain 1914 in its collection.
