= Sherborne Castle =

16th century house in Dorset, England

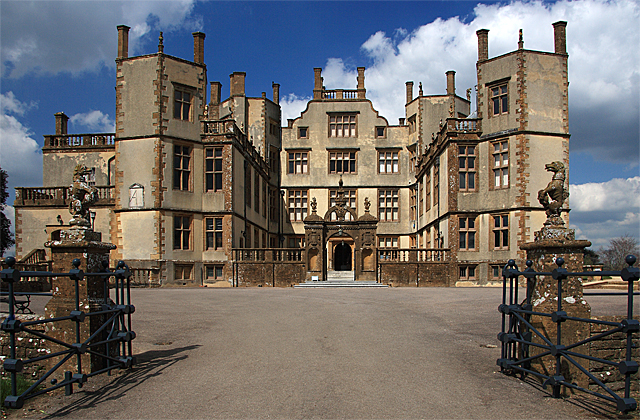
Sherborne Castle

Sherborne Castle (sometimes called Sherborne New Castle) is a 16th-century Tudor mansion southeast of Sherborne in Dorset, England, within the parish of Castleton. Originally built by Sir Walter Raleigh as Sherborne Lodge, and extended in the 1620s, it stands in a 1,200-acre (490 ha) park which formed a small part of the 15,000-acre (61 km^{2}) Digby estate. Within the grounds lie the ruins of the 12th-century Sherborne Old Castle, now in the care of English Heritage.

== Origins ==
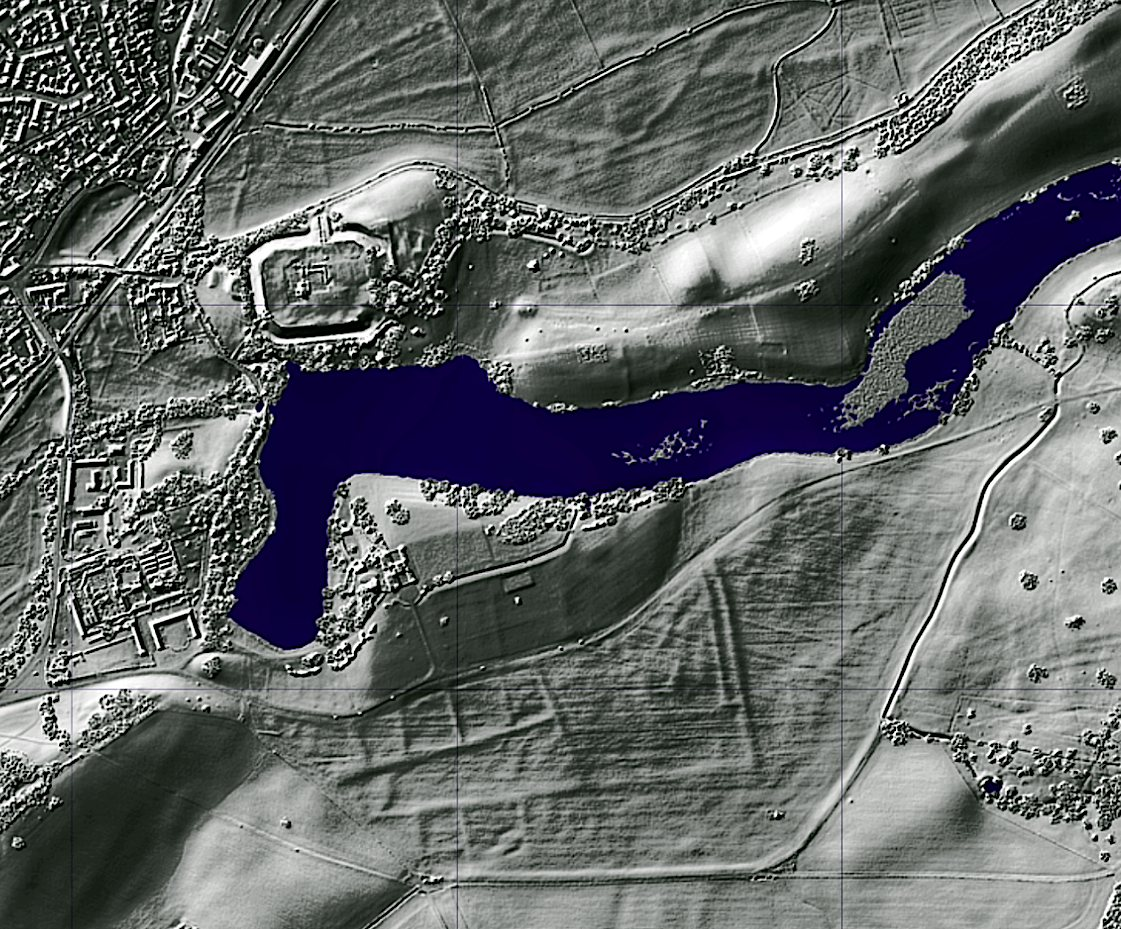
A lidar view of the castles.

The building now known as Sherborne Old Castle (50.9494°N 2.5024°W) was constructed in the 12th century as the fortified palace of Roger de Caen, Bishop of Salisbury and Chancellor of England. In the early 1140s, the castle was captured by Robert Earl of Gloucester during the Anarchy, when it was considered "the master-key of the whole kingdom".

== 16th century ==
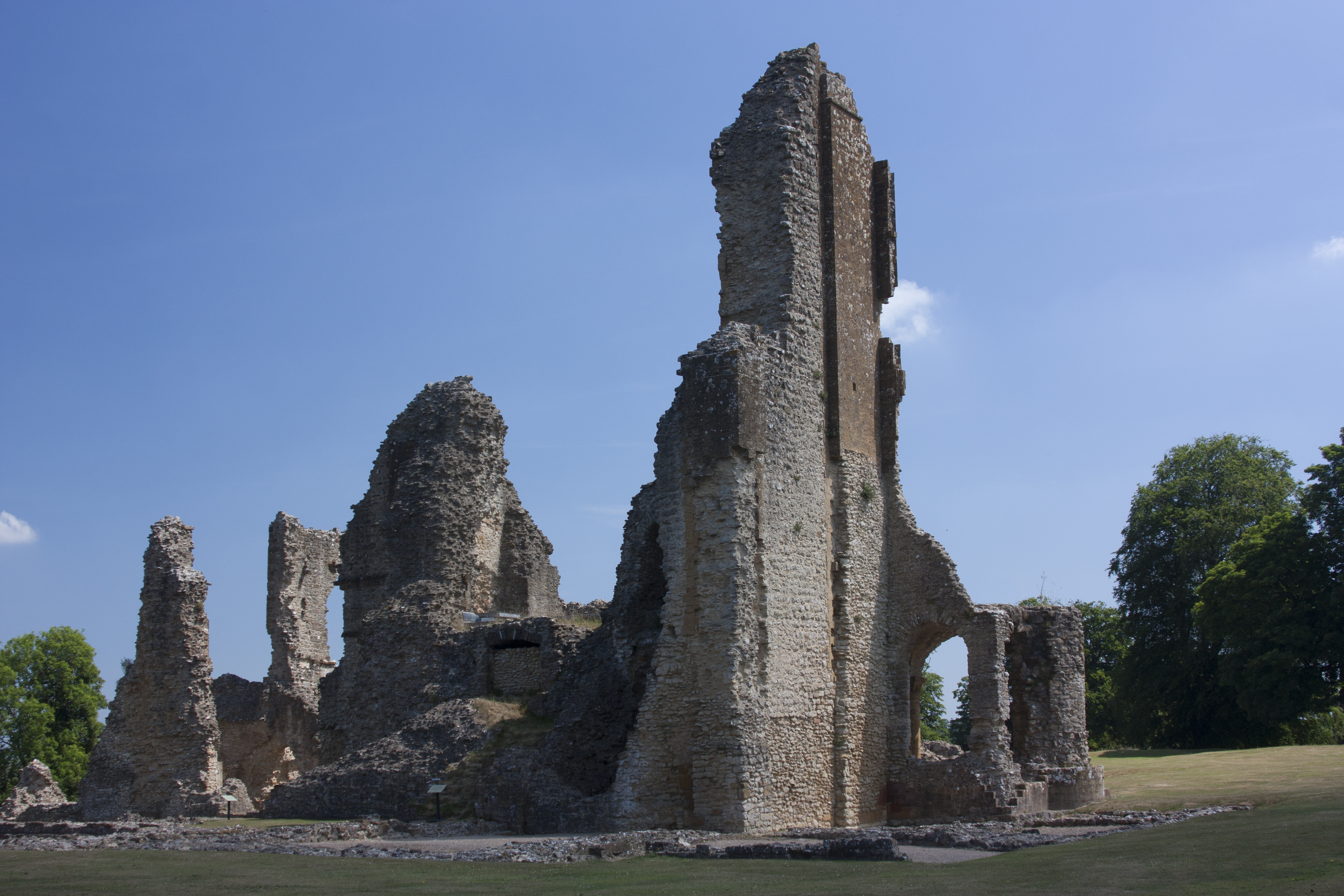
The ruins of Sherborne Old Castle

After passing through Sherborne on the way to Plymouth, Sir Walter Raleigh fell in love with the castle, and Queen Elizabeth relinquished the estate, leasing it to Raleigh in 1592. Rather than refurbish the castle, Raleigh decided to build a new house for temporary visits. He completed Sherborne Lodge, a four-storey rectangular building, in 1594. The antiquary John Aubrey described the building as "a delicate Lodge in the park, of Brick, not big, but very convenient for its bignes, a place to retire from the Court in summer time, and to contemplate, etc." It had four polygonal corner turrets with angled masonry as if they were to serve for military defence, which Nicholas Cooper suggests "may be an obeisance to the old building". Its most progressive feature for its date was the entrance, disguised in one of the corner towers so as not to spoil the apparent symmetry of the facade, which was centred on a rectangular forecourt. The entrance vestibule also contained a winder stairwell and gave directly onto the hall.

== 17th century ==
During Raleigh's imprisonment in the Tower of London, King James leased the estate to Robert Carr and then sold it to Sir John Digby, 1st Earl of Bristol in 1617. In the 1620s, the Digby family added four wings to Sherborne Lodge in an architectural style similar to the original, forming the mansion now known as Sherborne Castle or Sherborne New Castle.

George Digby, 2nd Earl of Bristol, was a Royalist advisor to Charles I during the Civil War, and Sherborne was a strongly Royalist area. The fortified old castle was captured by Parliamentarians in September 1642, and recaptured in February 1643. In early August 1645, a New Model Army force under Sir Thomas Fairfax laid siege to the castle, then occupied by a Royalist garrison commanded by Sir Lewis Dyve, half-brother of the Earl. Following heavy bombardment and mining, Dyve surrendered on 17 August 1645. The old castle was slighted in October 1645 and left in ruins.

== 18th to 20th centuries ==
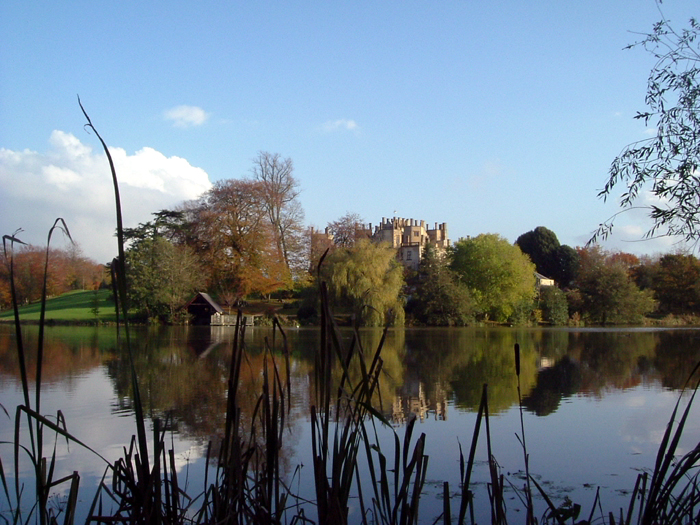
Capability Brown's lake in Digby's garden

Through the early and mid-18th century William, 5th Lord Digby, who laid out the grounds praised by Alexander Pope, and his heirs Edward, 6th Lord Digby, who inherited in 1752, and Henry, 7th Lord, created Earl Digby, laid out the present castle gardens. Features include the 1753 lake designed by Capability Brown, which separates the old and new castles. The ruins of the old castle form part of the garden design, being conspicuous amongst the trees across the lake. King George III visited the house and gardens in 1789, shortly before granting Henry Digby a new and highest peerage. When Edward, 2nd and last Earl Digby, died in 1856 the estate was passed to the Wingfield Digby family, who still own the property. The mansion was modernised by the architect Philip Charles Hardwick.

In the First World War the mansion was used by the Red Cross as a hospital, and in the Second World War as the headquarters for the commandos involved in the D-Day landings.

== Listings ==
Both the mansion and the ruins of the old castle were designated as grade I listed in 1951. Three outbuildings of the mansion, built in ashlar and stone, are grade II* listed: the stables (1759, extended early 19th century); the greenhouse (c. 1779); and the dairy (late 18th century).

The gardens are grade I listed in the National Register of Historic Parks and Gardens.

== Today ==
The gardens are open to the public for much of the year, and the mansion is open to the public most Saturdays. The estate often hosts special events, such as concerts and fireworks displays. The old castle is leased by English Heritage and is accessed separately from the rest of the estate.

== See also ==
- Castles in Great Britain and Ireland
- List of castles in England
