= William Digby (priest) =

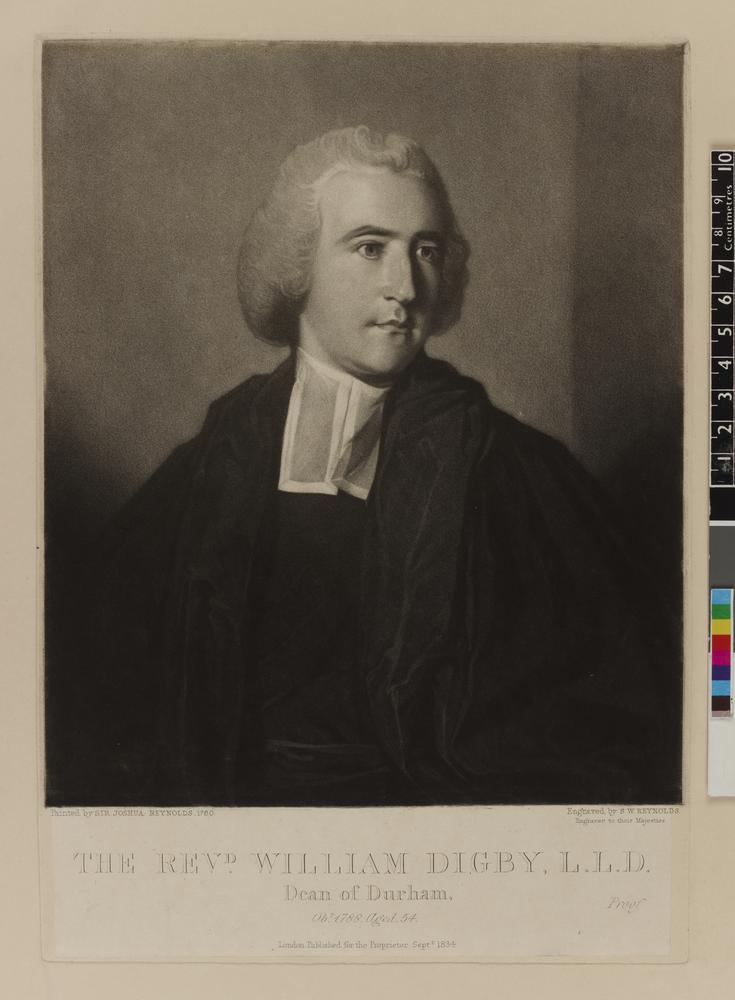

William Digby (21 January 1733 – 18 September 1788) was an eighteenth century Anglican priest.

He was the son of Hon. Edward Digby (son of William Digby, 5th Baron Digby) and Charlotte Fox, daughter of Sir Stephen Fox. He was the younger brother of Henry Digby, 1st Earl Digby and first cousin of Charles James Fox. Digby was Vicar of Coleshill and then successively Dean of Worcester and Durham. He was also an Honorary Chaplain to the King. He was the father of the naval officer Sir Henry Digby.

Church of England titles
Preceded by Richard Wrottesley, Bt	Dean of Worcester; 1769–1778	Succeeded by Robert Foley
Preceded by Thomas Dampier	Dean of Durham; 1778–1788	Succeeded by John Hinchliffe
