= Edward Digby, 2nd Earl Digby =

British peer (1773-1856)

Edward Digby, 2nd Earl Digby (6 January 1773 – 12 May 1856), known as Viscount Coleshill from 1790 to 1793, was a British peer.

Digby was the eldest son of Henry Digby, 1st Earl Digby, and Mary Knowler. He succeeded his father in the earldom in 1793 and was able to take his seat in the House of Lords on his twenty-first birthday the following year. Lord Digby is most notable for serving as Lord Lieutenant of Dorset for nearly fifty years, from 1808 to 1856. On 20 May 1824, he appointed himself Colonel of the Dorset Militia, in which he had served as a captain in his youth. He resigned the colonelcy at the beginning of 1846. He never married and on his death in May 1856, aged 83, the viscountcy and earldom became extinct. However, he was succeeded in the two baronies of Digby by his first cousin once removed Edward Digby, who became the 9th and 3rd Baron.

Coat of arms of Edward Digby, 2nd Earl Digby
Crest An ostrich, holding in the beak a horse-shoe all proper. Escutcheon Azure, a fleur-de-lis argent Supporters On either side a monkey proper environed about the middle and lined or. Motto DEO NON FORTUNA (From God not chance)

== Notes ==
Military offices
Preceded by Richard Bingham	Colonel of the Dorset Militia; 1824–1856	Succeeded by John James Smith
Honorary titles
Preceded by The Earl of Dorchester	Lord Lieutenant of Dorset; 1808–1856	Succeeded by The Earl of Shaftesbury
Peerage of Great Britain
Preceded by Henry Digby	Earl Digby; 1793–1856	Extinct
Preceded by Henry Digby	Baron Digby; 1793–1856	Succeeded by Edward Digby
Peerage of Ireland
Preceded by Henry Digby	Baron Digby; 1793–1856	Succeeded by Edward Digby
