= Edward Digby (died 1746) =

Member of Parliament for Warwickshire
- In office 1726–1746

Personal details
- Born: 1693
- Died: 2 October 1746 (aged 52–53)
- Spouse: Charlotte Fox
- Children: 7, including Edward, Henry, Robert and William
- Parents: William Digby, 5th Baron Digby (father); Jane Noel (mother)

Edward Digby (c. 1693 – 2 October 1746) was the third son of William Digby, 5th Baron Digby. He represented Warwickshire as a Tory from his brother Robert's death in 1726 until his own death in 1746.

== Biography ==
From about 1725 until his death, he lived in the manor house at Wandsworth, Surrey. At the by-election after the death of his brother Robert in 1726, Edward was returned as Member of Parliament for Warwickshire. A Tory, he frequently spoke in opposition to the Walpole Ministry. During the 1730s, he spoke on several occasions against the employment of a standing army and of foreign troops. He denounced Sir Robert Sutton after the collapse of the Charitable Corporation, supported an unsuccessful place bill to bar government officeholders from Parliament in 1734, and opposed the Charitable Uses Act 1735, which imposed more stringent rules on making charitable bequests of land. He also attempted to amend the Exemption from Impressment Act 1739 to provide for the issue of a protection certificate to those rejected for impressment, but was not successful. Outside of Parliament, he, like his father, was active in the Georgia Society, and served as its first chairman.

After the collapse of the Walpole ministry in 1742, Digby, writing to his friend John Ward, expressed his discontent over the lack of constructive leadership on the part of the Tories, feeling the Duke of Argyll inferior as a leader to Sir William Wyndham. The secret committee to inquire into Walpole's conduct had, he thought, been rendered nugatory through the failure of the bill to indemnify those giving evidence before it, and he was very much discontented by the machinations which brought the next ministry to power. He died during the lifetime of his father, on 2 October 1746.

== Family ==
On 10 July 1729, he married Charlotte Fox (d. November 1778), the daughter of Sir Stephen Fox, by whom he had six sons and one daughter:

- Edward Digby, 6th Baron Digby (1730–1757)
- Henry Digby, 1st Earl Digby (1731–1793)
- Adm. Robert Digby, RN (1732–1815)
- Rev. William Digby (1733–1788)
- Col. Stephen Digby (1742–1800)
- Rev. Charles Digby (1743–1811), rector of Kilmington, Somerset, married Priscillia Melliar in 1775
- Charlotte Digby (died 16 June 1753)

Parliament of Great Britain
Preceded by William Peyto; Hon. Robert Digby	Member of Parliament for Warwickshire; 1726–1746; With: William Peyto 1726–1734; Sir Charles Mordaunt 1734–1746	Succeeded by Sir Charles Mordaunt; Hon. William Craven
