= Edward Digby, 6th Baron Digby =

British peer & politician (1730-1757)

Member of Parliament for Malmesbury
- In office 1751–1754

Member of Parliament for Wells
- In office 1754–1757

Personal details
- Born: 5 July 1730
- Died: 30 November 1757 (aged 27)
- Parents: Edward Digby (father); Charlotte Fox (mother)

Edward Digby, 6th Baron Digby (5 July 1730 – 30 November 1757), was a British peer and Member of Parliament.

== Biography ==
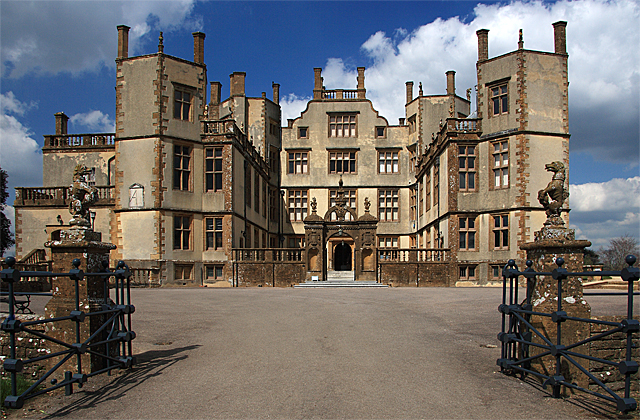
Sherborne Castle, Dorset

Digby was the son of Hon. Edward Digby, son of William Digby, 5th Baron Digby. His mother was Charlotte Fox, daughter of Sir Stephen Fox and sister of Henry Fox, 1st Baron Holland.

He was a close connection of the Foxes, and from 1744 on regularly attended their annual shooting party in Wiltshire. On 13 June 1751, he was returned at Malmesbury on Henry Fox's interest after the death of James Douglas. Around this time, he was appointed a Groom of the Bedchamber to George, Prince of Wales. On 27 November 1752, he succeeded his grandfather William as Baron Digby, an Irish peerage which did not oblige him to vacate his seat in the Commons. He resigned his bedchamber office in 1753 as a result of his succession, by which he inherited Sherborne Castle in Dorset.

Digby intended to contest Dorset, where he had large estates, in the next general election and asked for the support of the Duke of Newcastle, but when George Trenchard nominated him at the county meeting of gentlemen in August 1753, there was no enthusiasm for his candidacy and he dropped the plan. Instead, Fox had him returned for Wells at the 1754 election on a joint interest with Charles Tudway.

As befitted a connection of Fox, Digby was a Whig, but took relatively little interest in politics. His health was poor, and he hoped to obtain a higher peerage, either a British title or an Irish earldom, an object left unfulfilled. In 1756, he was operated on for kidney stones by Dr Adair Hawkins. He survived the surgery, but the wound was slow to heal, and he was left an invalid until he died on 30 November 1757.

Digby was known for acts of great benevolence. In particular, he was known to visit the Marshalsea Debtors' prison at least twice annually, at Christmas and Easter, and each time secure the release of a number of prisoners by paying off their debts. He would then take the newly freed individuals to George Inn in Borough for dinner.

Digby never married and was succeeded in the barony by his younger brother Henry, who was created Earl Digby in 1790.

Coat of arms of Edward Digby, 6th Baron Digby
Crest An ostrich, holding in the beak a horse-shoe all proper. Escutcheon Azure, a fleur-de-lis argent Supporters On either side a monkey proper environed about the middle and lined or. Motto DEO NON FORTUNA (From God not chance)

Parliament of Great Britain
Preceded by John Lee; James Douglas	Member of Parliament for Malmesbury; 1751–1754; With: John Lee	Succeeded by Lord George Bentinck; Brice Fisher
Preceded by Francis Gwyn; George Hamilton	Member of Parliament for Wells; 1754–1757; With: Charles Tudway	Succeeded by Charles Tudway; Robert Digby
Peerage of Ireland
Preceded by William Digby	Baron Digby; 1752–1757	Succeeded by Henry Digby
