= William Digby, 5th Baron Digby =

English politician (1661–1752)

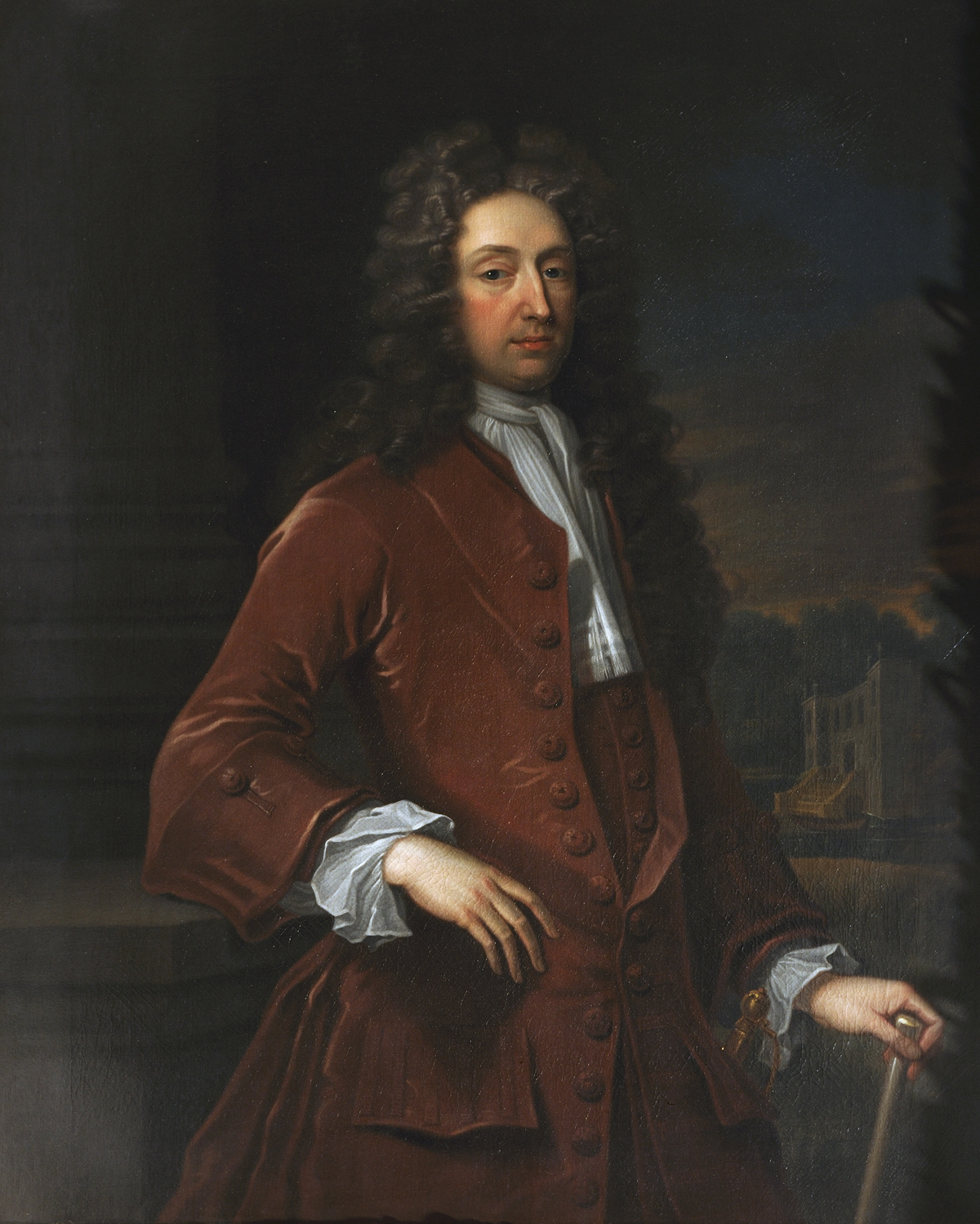
Portrait of Digby attributed to Godfrey Kneller

William Digby, 5th Baron Digby (20 February 1661 – 27 November 1752) was an English politician.

== Life ==
Digby was a younger son of Kildare Digby, 2nd Baron Digby, and Mary Gardiner. He matriculated at Magdalen College, Oxford on 16 May 1679, and received a BA in 1681.

In 1686 he succeeded his elder brother as fifth Baron Digby. This was an Irish peerage and did not entitle him to a seat in the English House of Lords. He was instead elected to the House of Commons for Warwick in 1689, a constituency he continued to represent until 1698. In September 1698, he inherited the estate of Sherborne Castle from his third cousin once removed, John Digby, 3rd Earl of Bristol.

In 1708, Digby was awarded a DCL from Oxford. He died in November 1752, aged 91, and was succeeded in the barony by his grandson Edward Digby, his son the Hon. Edward Digby having predeceased him.

== Family ==
Lord Digby married Lady Jane Noel (c. 1664 – 10 September 1733), daughter of Edward Noel, 1st Earl of Gainsborough, in 1686. They had four sons and eight daughters:

- Hon. John Digby (c. 1687 – 18 March 1746), matriculated at Magdalen College, Oxford on 10 September 1703 and received his MA on 8 May 1707. On 11 April 1715, his father petitioned the House of Lords for a private bill to disinherit John, who had become insane in 1711 while abroad and was considered incurable.
- Hon. Robert Digby (c. 1692 – 19 August 1726)
- Hon. Edward Digby (c. 1693 – 1746), married and had issue
- Hon. Wriothesley Digby (d. 12 May 1767) He matriculated at Magdalen College on 9 March 1713 or 1714 and received a BA in 1716. He obtained a BCL from All Souls College, Oxford in 1721, was admitted a barrister of the Middle Temple in 1725, and awarded a DCL in 1726. He married Mary Cotes of Woodcote and had issue.
- Hon. Mary Digby (c. 1689 – 31 March 1729)
- Hon. Elizabeth Digby (d. 1730), married Sir John Dolben, 2nd Baronet and was the mother of Sir William Dolben, 3rd Baronet, the noted campaigner against the slave trade
- Hon. Rachel Digby, died young
- Hon. Jane Digby, died young
- Hon. Juliana Digby, married Herbert Mackworth
- Hon. Catharine Digby (c. 1702 – 13 April 1745)
- Hon. Frances Digby (died 19 September 1788), married James Cotes of Woodcote
- Hon. Jane Digby (c. 1706 – 1 October 1738)

Coat of arms of William Digby, 5th Baron Digby
| Crest An ostrich, holding in the beak a horse-shoe all proper. Escutcheon Azure, a fleur-de-lis argent Supporters On either side a monkey proper environed about the middle and lined or. Motto DEO NON FORTUNA (From God not chance) |

== Bibliography ==
- Erskine-Hill, Howard (1975) 'Christian Nobleman': William, fifth Baron Digby of Geashill (1662–1752) in: The Social Milieu of Alexander Pope

Parliament of England
| Preceded by Thomas Coventry; William Colemore | Member of Parliament for Warwick; 1689–1698; With: William Colemore 1689–95; Francis Greville 1695–98 | Succeeded by Robert Greville; Sir Thomas Wagstaffe |
Peerage of Ireland
| Preceded by Simon Digby | Baron Digby; 1685–1752 | Succeeded by Edward Digby |
