= William Buckner (priest) =

17th-century English priest and Archdeacon of Sarum

William Buckner (1605–1657) was an English Anglican priest in the 17th century, who held the office of Archdeacon of Sarum from 1643.

He was christened in the parish of St Bartholomew-by-the-Exchange in London on 27 Oct 1605, a younger son of Thomas Buckner, a London mercer at whose house Thomas Harriot died in July 1621. His father had accompanied Harriot to the New World on the first (abortive) Roanoke Colony venture in 1585, led by Ralph Lane. William Buckner matriculated at Christ Church in Oxford at the age of 16 in October 1621 and ultimately was conferred the M.A. degree in 1626. He pursued a career in the Anglican Church. Buckner was ordained a priest in 1629 and instituted rector of Hertingfordbury, Hertfordshire in 1630. He resigned that position soon after to become vicar of Damerham and Martin, then in Wiltshire. At some point, he became the minister of St Thomas parish in Salisbury and was collated Archdeacon of Sarum in 1643 on the death of his predecessor Thomas Marler. Like many Anglican clergy, he was deprived of his office during the Commonwealth. He died in late 1657 and was succeeded by Anthony Hawles.
