= Francis Lear =

Francis Lear may refer to:

- Francis Lear (dean of Salisbury) (1789–1850), Anglican priest
- Francis Lear (archdeacon of Sarum) (1823–1914), his son, Anglican priest
