= Eton College =

Private school in Berkshire, England

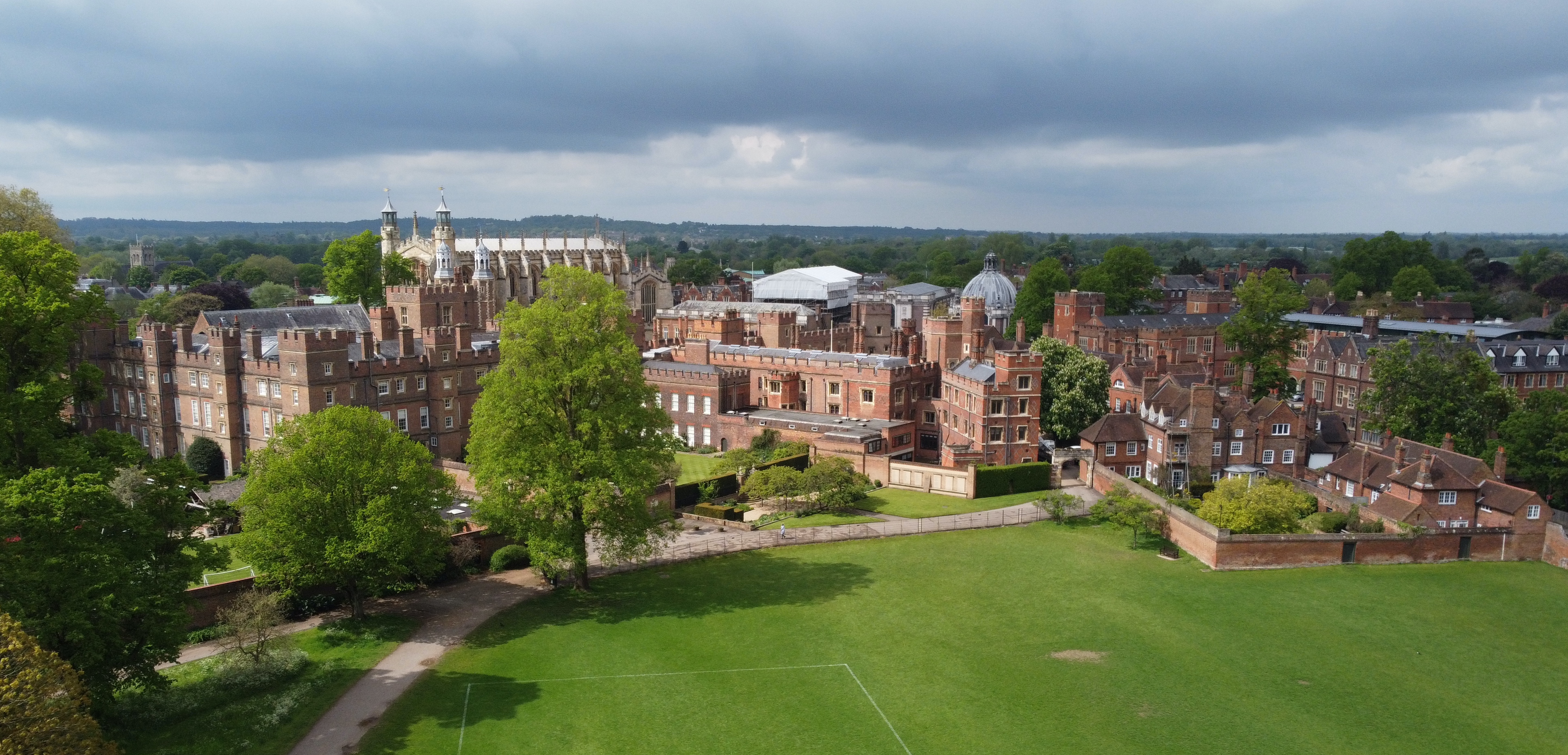
- Aerial view of Eton College from the north

Location
- Eton, Berkshire, England, SL4 6DW; 51.492°N 0.608°W

Information
- Type: Public school Private boys' boarding school
- Motto: Latin: Floreat Etona (May Eton Flourish)
- Religious affiliation: Church of England
- Established: 1440; 586 years ago
- Founder: Henry VI
- Sister school: King's College, Cambridge
- Local authority: Windsor and Maidenhead
- Department for Education URN: 110158 Tables
- Provost: Sir Nicholas Coleridge
- Head Master: Simon Henderson
- Gender: Boys
- Age range: 13–18
- Enrolment: 1,341 (2024)
- Capacity: 1,390
- Student to teacher ratio: 8:1
- Houses: 25
- Colour: Eton blue
- Song: Carmen Etonense
- Publication: The Chronicle
- School fees: £63,298.80 per year
- Alumni: Old Etonians
- Campus: 1,600-acre (6.5 km^{2}) semi-rural campus
- Affiliations: G30 Schools; HMC; The Rugby Group
- Website: Eton College
- "Eton College, registered charity no. 1139086". Charity Commission for England and Wales.

Eton College (/ˈiːtən/ EE-tən) is an English public school (a fee-charging boarding school) providing education for boys aged 13–18, located in Eton, Berkshire. (Note: "Public schools" in the United Kingdom is a traditional description for elite, fee-charging schools.) The school was founded in 1440 by Henry VI as Kynge's College of Our Ladye of Eton besyde Windesore, and is the largest boarding school in England.

Eton is known for its history, wealth, and notable alumni (Old Etonians), having been referred to as "the nurse of England's statesmen". It is also one of three public schools (the others being Harrow and Radley) to have retained a boys-only, boarding-only tradition.

The school is part of the Headmasters' and Headmistresses' Conference and the Eton Group.

== History ==
=== Establishment ===
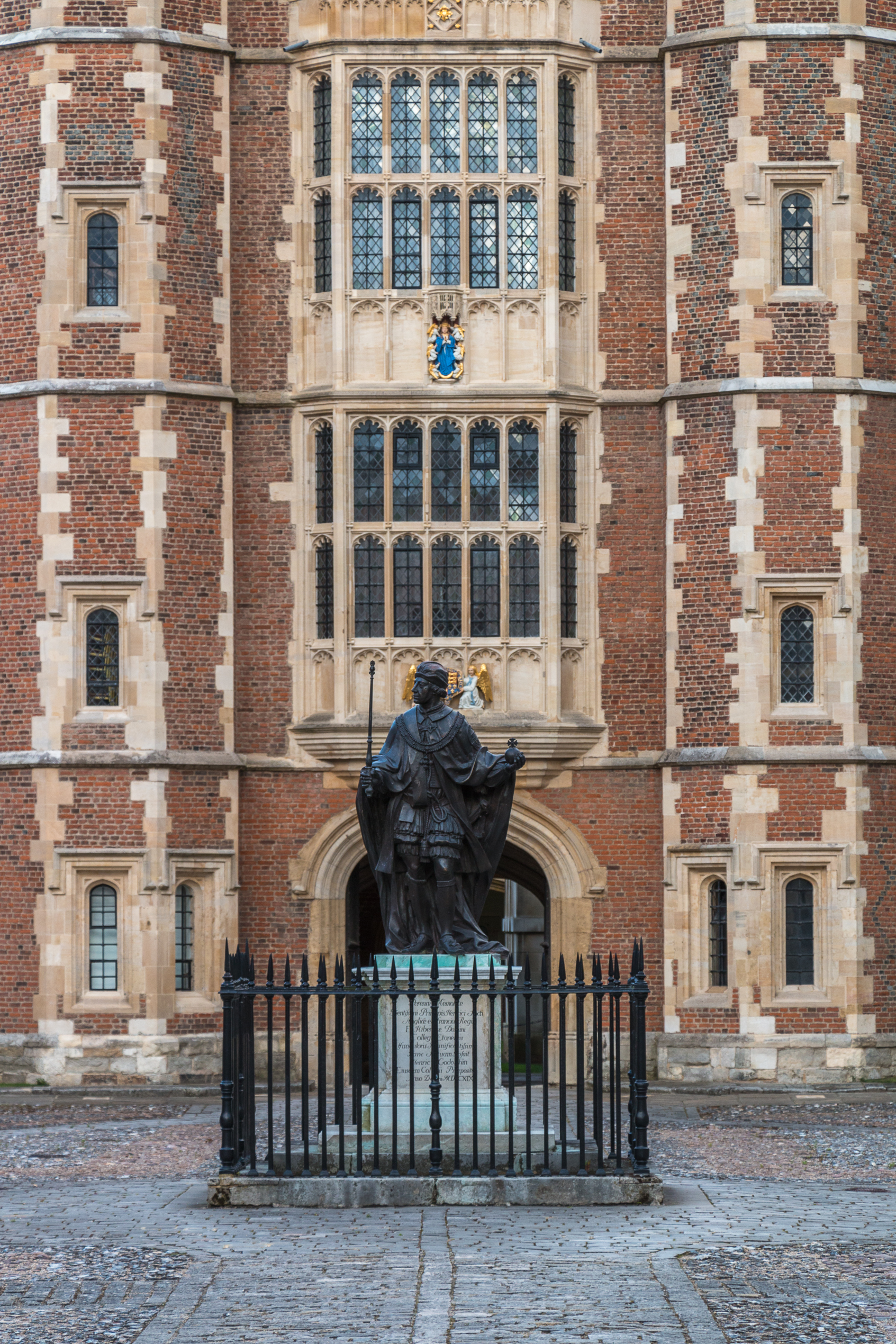
A statue of Henry VI in the school yard

Eton College was founded in 1440 by Henry VI as the Kynge's College of Our Ladye of Eton besyde Windesore. It was originally a charity feeder school for King's College, Cambridge, providing a free education for 70 poor boys. Henry used Winchester College as a model, visiting it at least six times (Note: In 1441, 1444, 1446, 1447, 1448, 1449, 1451, 1452) and having its statutes transcribed. He then appointed Winchester's headmaster, William Waynflete, as Eton's Provost, and transferred some of Winchester's scholars to start his new school.

Soon after Eton's establishment, Henry granted it a large number of endowments, including much valuable land forfeited from alien priories. (Note: The group of feoffees appointed by the king to receive these lands are as follows: Henry Chichele, Archbishop of Canterbury (d. 1443); Thomas Spofford, Bishop of Hereford (d. 1456); John Low, Bishop of Rochester (d. 1467); William Ayscough, Bishop of Salisbury (d. 1450); William de la Pole, 1st Marquess of Suffolk (1396–1450) (later Duke of Suffolk); John Somerset (d. 1454), Chancellor of the Exchequer and the king's doctor; Thomas Beckington (c. 1390–1465), Archdeacon of Buckingham, the king's secretary and later Keeper of the Privy Seal; Richard Andrew (d. 1477), first Warden of All Souls College, Oxford, later the king's secretary; Adam Moleyns (d. 1450), Clerk of the Council; John Hampton (d. 1472) of Kinver, Staffordshire, an Esquire of the Body; James Fiennes, another member of the Royal Household; William Tresham, another member of the Royal Household)

The school also housed several religious relics and artefacts such as a part of the True Cross, Crown of Thorns, and one of England's Apocalypse manuscripts.

However, when Henry was deposed by King Edward IV in 1461, all grants to the school were annulled. A large number of Eton's assets and treasures were transferred to St George's Chapel, Windsor. Legend has it that Edward's mistress, Jane Shore, intervened on the school's behalf and was able to save a good part of the school, although the royal bequest and the number of staff were still very much reduced.

==== Campus ====
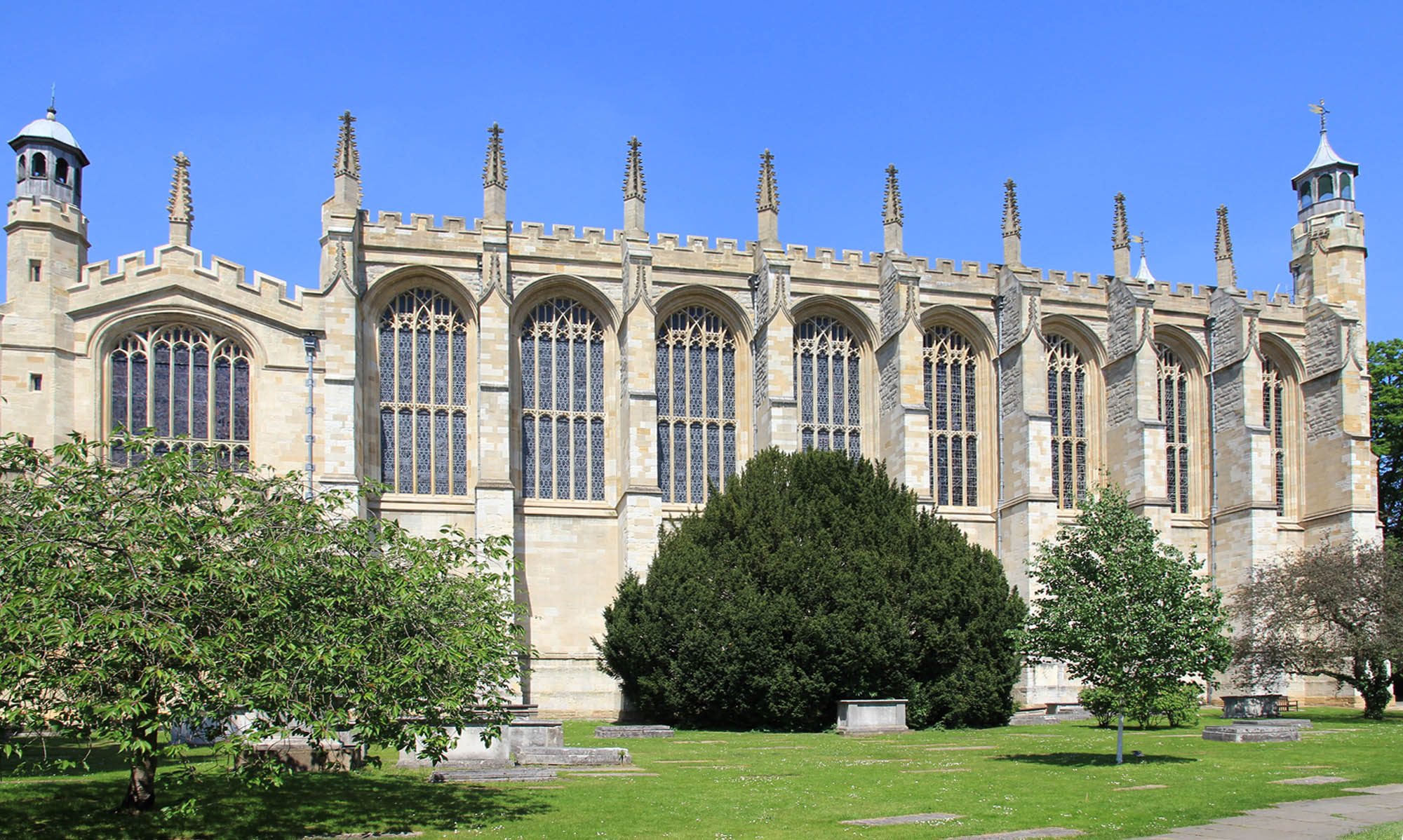
The College Chapel

Eton College was designed to be ornate and striking. Under Henry VI's plans, the nave of the college chapel would have been the longest in Europe, featuring 18, or possibly 17 bays. The lower storeys of the cloister, including College Hall, were also built under Henry (1441 and 1460 respectively).

After Henry's deposition, construction of the chapel was halted, leaving only the quire section and 8 bays. The chapel was completed by Eton's first Headmaster, William Waynflete through the building of the ante-chapel. The important wall paintings in the chapel and the brick north range of the present School Yard also date from the 1480s.

The school struggled with funding during this period of construction, leaving the completion and further development of the school dependent to a certain extent on wealthy benefactors. Building resumed when Roger Lupton was Provost, around 1517. His name is borne by the large gatehouse in the west range of the cloisters, fronting School Yard, perhaps the most famous image of the school. This range includes the important interiors of the Parlour, Election Hall, and Election Chamber, where most of the 18th century "leaving portraits" are kept.

After Lupton's time, nothing major was built until around 1670, when Provost Allestree donated a range to close the west side of School Yard between Lower School and Chapel". This was remodelled later and completed in 1694 by Matthew Bankes, Master Carpenter of the Royal Works. The last important addition to the central college buildings was the College Library, in the south range of the cloister, 1725–29, by Thomas Rowland. It has a very important collection of books and manuscripts.

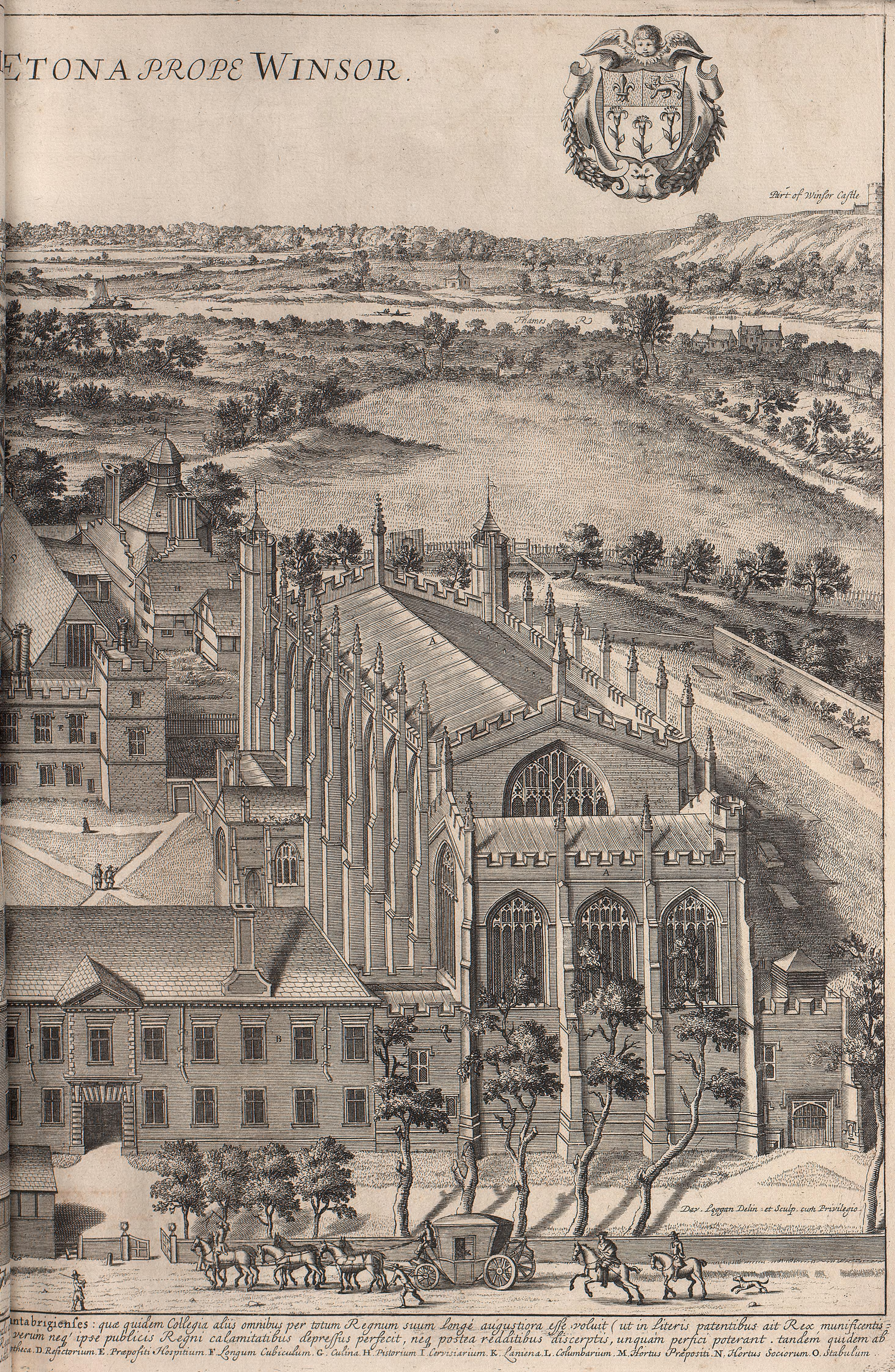
A 1690 engraving of Eton College by David Loggan

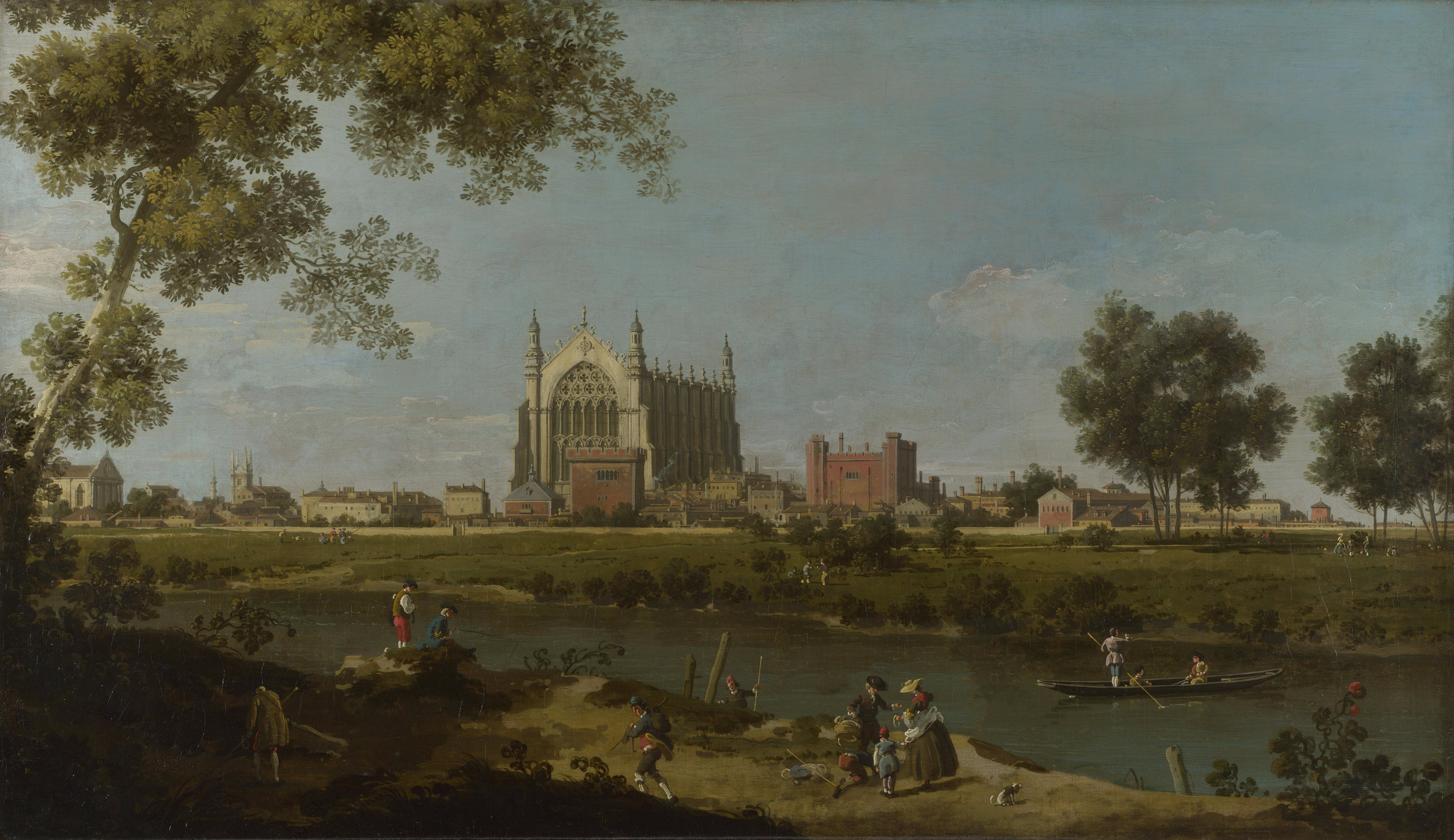
Eton College by Canaletto, 1754

=== 19th century onwards ===
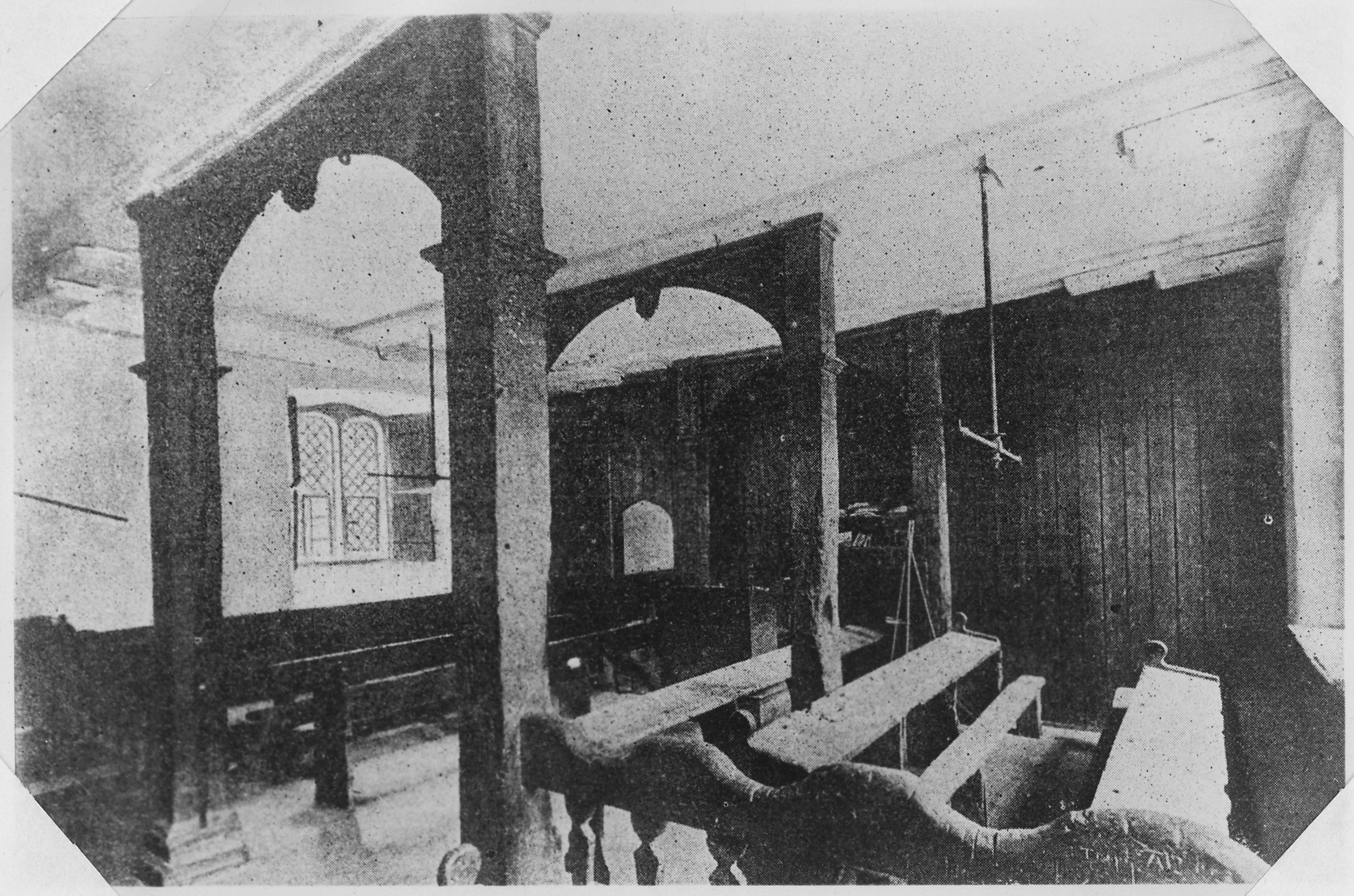
An Eton College classroom in the 19th century

The Duke of Wellington is often incorrectly quoted as saying that "The Battle of Waterloo was won on the playing-fields of Eton." Wellington studied at Eton from 1781 to 1784, and later sent his sons there. According to Nevill (citing the historian Sir Edward Creasy), what Wellington said, while passing an Eton cricket match many decades later, was, "There grows the stuff that won Waterloo", a remark Nevill construes as a reference to "the manly character induced by games and sport" among English youth generally, not a comment about Eton specifically. In 1889, Sir William Fraser conflated this uncorroborated remark with the one attributed to him by Count Charles de Montalembert's C'est ici qu'a été gagnée la bataille de Waterloo ("It is here that the Battle of Waterloo was won").

The architect John Shaw Jr (1803–1870) became a surveyor to Eton. He designed New Buildings (1844–46), Provost Francis Hodgson's addition to provide better accommodation for collegers, who until then had mostly lived in Long Chamber, a long first-floor room where conditions were inhumane.

Following complaints about the finances, buildings and management of Eton, the Clarendon Commission was set up in 1861 as a royal commission to investigate the state of nine schools in England, including Eton. Questioned by the commission in 1862, Head Master Edward Balston came under attack for his view that in the classroom little time could be spared for subjects other than classical studies.

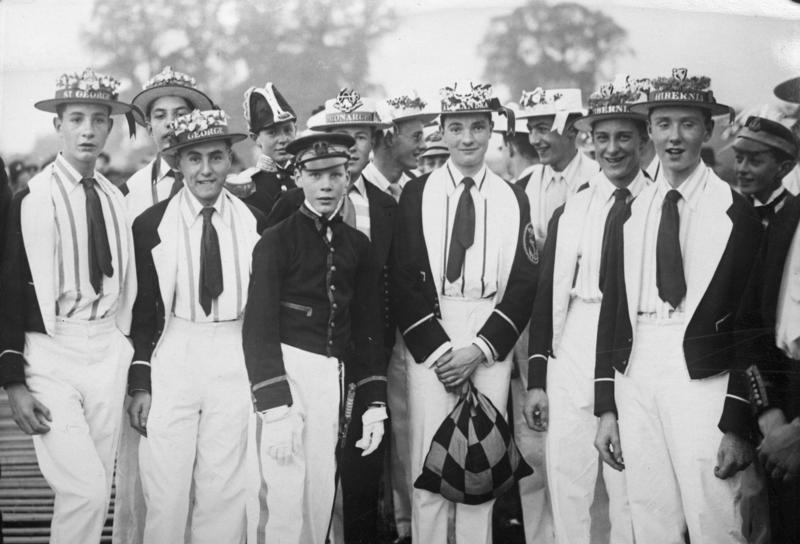
Eton College pupils dressed as members of various rowing crews taking part in the "Procession of Boats" on the River Thames during Fourth of June celebrations in 1932

As with other public schools, a scheme was devised towards the end of the 19th century to familiarise privileged schoolboys with social conditions in deprived areas. The project of establishing an "Eton Mission" in the crowded district of Hackney Wick in east London was started at the beginning of 1880, and it lasted until 1971 when it was decided that a more local project (at Dorney) would be more realistic. However over the years much money was raised for the Eton Mission, a fine church by G. F. Bodley was erected; many Etonians visited and stimulated among other things the Eton Manor Boys' Club, a notable rowing club which has survived the Mission itself, and the 59 Club for motorcyclists.

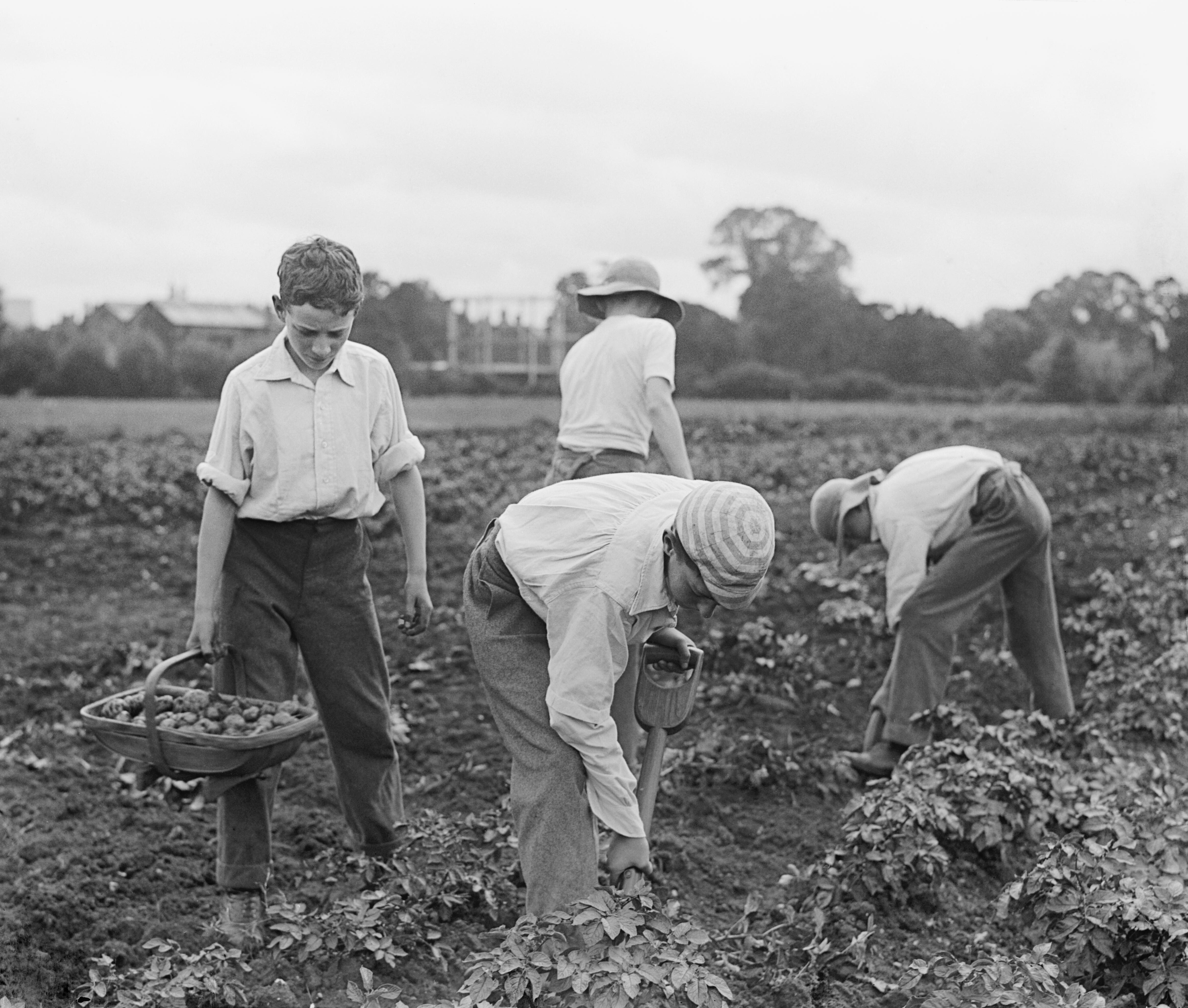
Eton schoolboys digging potatoes from a victory garden on the school's playing fields during World War I

The large and ornate School Hall and School Library (by L. K. Hall) were erected in 1906–08 across the road from Upper School as the school's memorial to the Etonians who had died in the Boer War. Many tablets in the cloisters and chapel commemorate the large number of dead Etonians of the First World War.

In December 1940, during the height of the Blitz, a bomb fell on the College grounds, destroying part of the Upper School and blowing out the stained glass windows of the Chapel. In 1949 the College commissioned modernist replacement windows from Irish stained glass artist Evie Hone. The large Crucifixion window in the east wall was installed according to her design in 1952. However, Hone's death the following year prevented her from completing the Chapel's entire reglazing scheme. In 1959 the commission for the eight windows of the nave passed instead to artist John Piper, whose designs were realised in glass by his regular collaborator, the glassmaker Patrick Reyntiens, over the next five years. Intended to be in dialogue with Hone's east window, the four windows to the north each depict one of the Miracles of Jesus - the Miraculous Draft of Fishes, the Feeding of the Five Thousand, the Stilling of the Waters, and the Raising of Lazarus. To the south four Parables of Jesus are shown - the Light under a Bushel, the House built on Rock, the Lost Sheep, and the Sower.

Among Head Masters of the late 19th and 20th centuries were Cyril Alington, Robert Birley and Anthony Chenevix-Trench. M. R. James was a Provost. Between 1926 and 1939, Eton pupils were included as part of a group of around 20 or 30 selected public school boys who travelled yearly to various British Empire countries as part of the Public School Boys Empire Tour. The first tour travelled to Australia; the last went to Canada. The purpose of the tours was to encourage Empire settlement, with the boys possibly becoming district officers in India or imperial governors of the Dominions.

In 1959, the college constructed a nuclear bunker to house the college's Provost and fellows. The facility is now used for storage. In 1969, Dillibe Onyeama became the first black person to obtain his school-leaving certificate from Eton. Three years later Onyeama was banned from visiting Eton after he published a book which described the racism that he experienced during his time at the school. Simon Henderson, current Head Master of Eton, apologised to Onyeama for the treatment he endured during his time at the school, although Onyeama did not think the apology was necessary.

In 2005, the school was one of fifty of the country's leading independent schools found to have breached the Competition Act 1998 (see Eton College controversies). In 2011, plans to attack Eton College were found on the body of a senior al-Qaeda leader shot dead in Somalia.

== Overview ==
=== Coat of arms ===
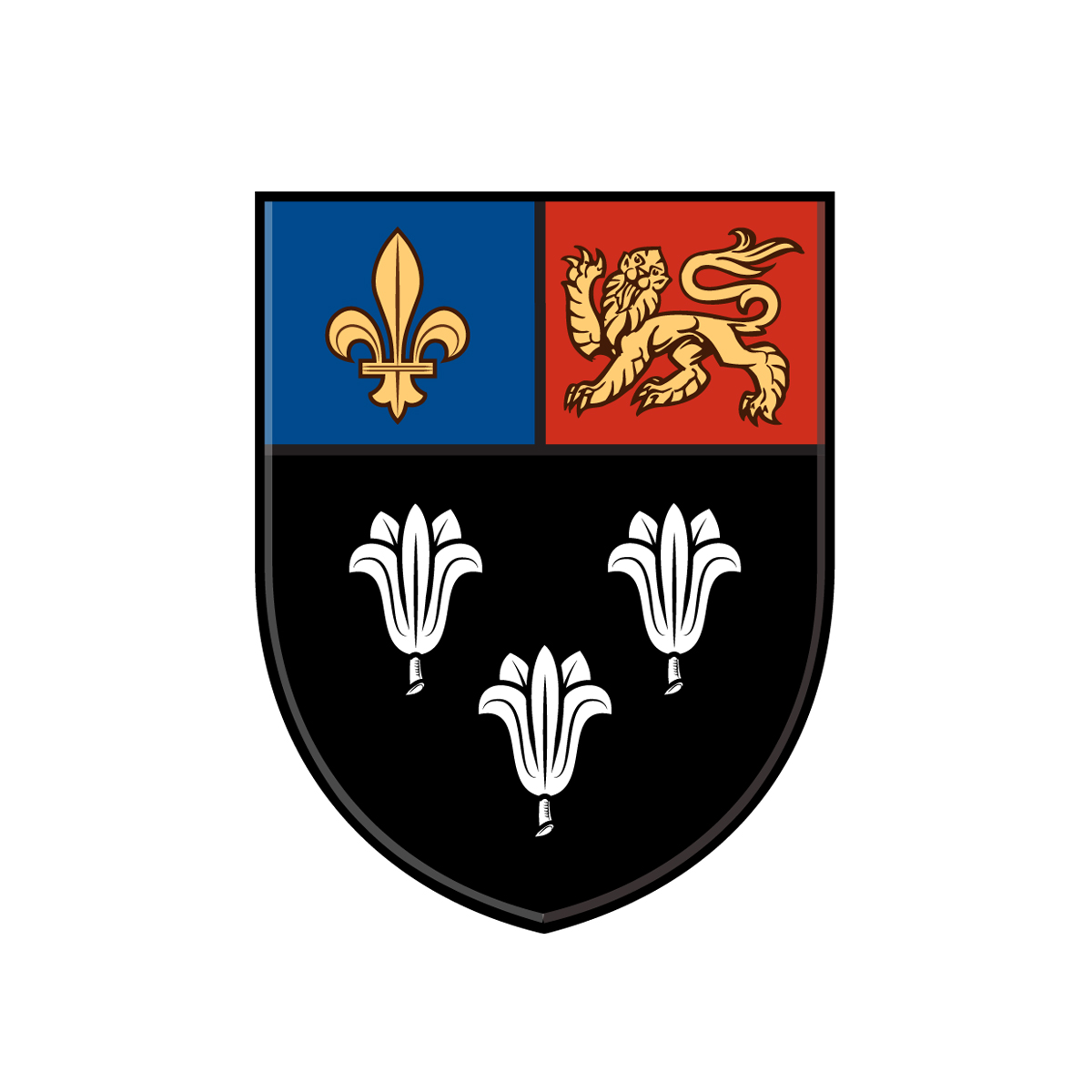
Arms of Eton College: Sable, three lily-flowers argent on a chief per pale azure and gules in the dexter a fleur-de-lys in the sinister a lion passant guardant or

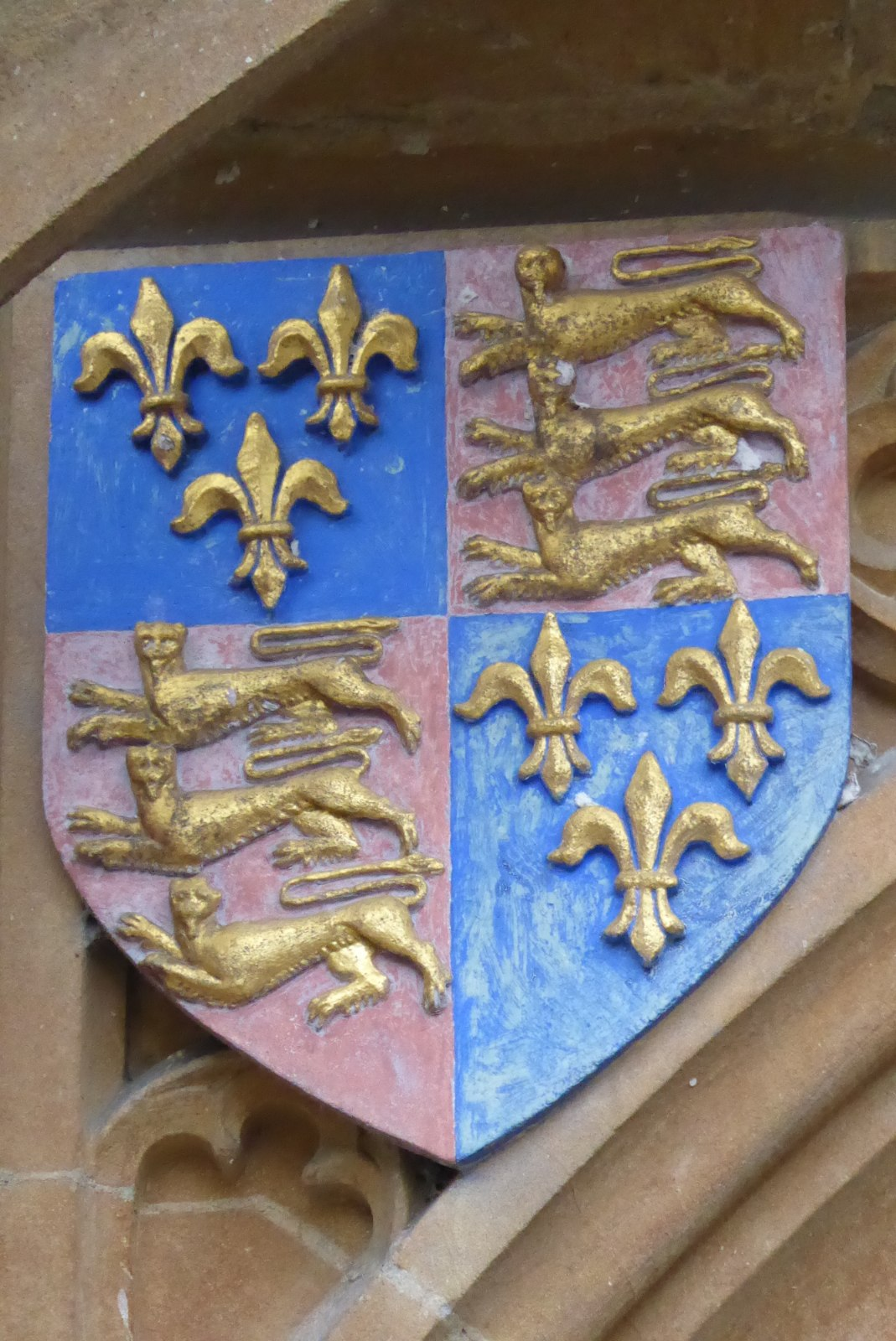
Henry VI's coat of arms

The coat of arms of Eton College was granted in 1449 by the founder King Henry VI, as recorded as follows on the original charter, attested by the Great Seal of England and preserved in the College archives:

On a field sable three lily-flowers argent, intending that Our newly founded College, lasting for ages to come, whose perpetuity We wish to be signified by the stability of the sable colour, shall bring forth the brightest flowers redolent of every kind of knowledge; to which also, that We may impart something of royal nobility which may declare the work truly royal and illustrious, We have resolved that that portion of the arms which by royal right belong to Us in the Kingdoms of France and England be placed on the chief of the shield, per pale azure with a flower of the French, and gules with a leopard passant or.

Thus the blazon is: Sable, three lily-flowers argent on a chief per pale azure and gules in the dexter a fleur-de-lys in the sinister a lion passant guardant or. The three lilies are also evident on the coat-of-arms of Eton provost Roger Lupton. Although the charter specifies that the lily flowers relate to the founder's hope for a flourishing of knowledge, that flower is also a symbol for the Virgin Mary, in whose honour the college was founded, with the number of three having significance to the Blessed Trinity. The motto of the college is Floreat Etona ("may Eton flourish"). The grant of arms to King's College, Cambridge, is worded identically, but with roses instead of lily-flowers.

=== Governance and management ===
The school is headed by a Provost, a vice-provost and a board of governors (known as Fellows) who appoint the Head Master. As of 2022 the school governors include:

- Sir Nicholas Coleridge (Provost; appointed 2024)
- Peter Mckee (Vice Provost)
- Professor Michael Proctor
- Princess Antonia, Duchess of Wellington
- Lady Moore of Etchingham
- Mark Esiri
- George Leggatt, Lord Leggatt
- Sir Mark Lyall Grant
- Helena Morrissey, Baroness Morrissey
- Simon Vivian
- Professor Francis Brown (mathematician) (2022)
- Professor Ewan Birney

Statute VII of the College provides that the board shall be populated as follows (in addition to the Provost and Vice-Provost):

- The Provost of King's College, Cambridge
- One Fellow to be elected by the Provost & Fellows, who is or has been a member of a faculty of, or a fellow of a college at the University of Oxford
- One Fellow to be elected by the Provost & Fellows, who is or has been a member of a faculty of, or a fellow of a college at the University of Cambridge
- One Fellow to be nominated by the Council of the Royal Society following identification by the Provost & Fellows or a suitable candidate from amongst the Fellowship of the Royal Society
- One Fellow to be nominated by the Lord Chief Justice of England and Wales
- One Fellow to be elected by the Head Master, Lower Master, and Assistant Masters
- Four Fellows to be elected by the Provost and Fellows themselves

The previous Provost, William Waldegrave, Baron Waldegrave of North Hill, stepped down in 2024, to be succeeded by Sir Nicolas Coleridge.

=== Houses ===
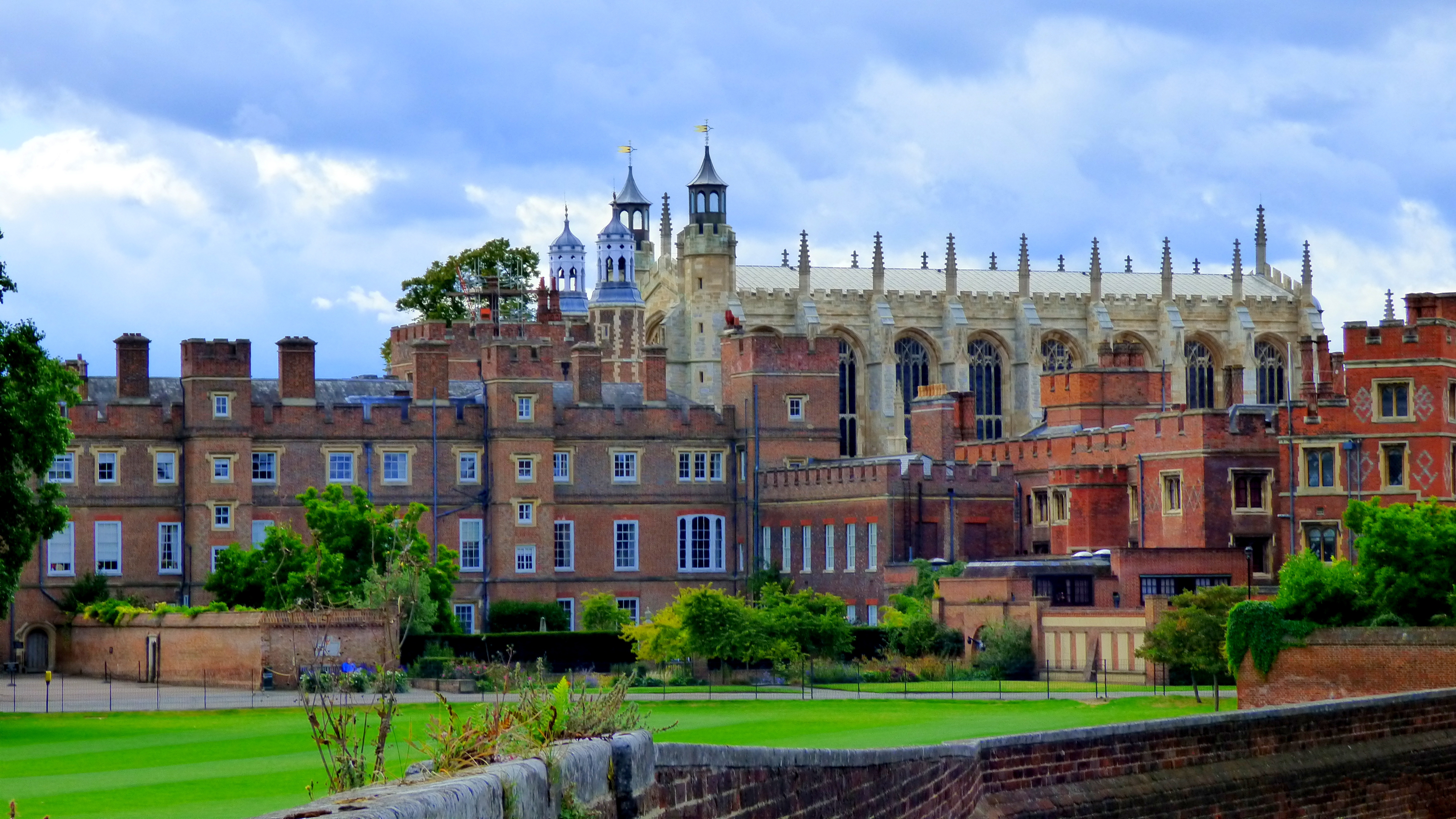
A view of College (the boarding house for academic scholars), College Chapel and College Field from the north

The school contains 25 boys' houses, each headed by a housemaster, selected from the more senior members of the teaching staff, which numbers some 155. Almost all of the school's pupils go on to universities, about a third of them to the University of Oxford or University of Cambridge.

==== King's Scholars ====
One boarding house, College, is reserved for 70 King's Scholars, who attend Eton on scholarships provided by the original foundation and awarded by excelling in an examination prior to entry. Today, the scholarship is only in name, and no financial incentive is automatically provided. Still, up to a third receive some kind of bursary or scholarship. The name 'King's Scholars' refers to the foundation of the school by King Henry VI in 1440. The original school consisted of the 70 Scholars (together with some Commensals) and the Scholars were educated and boarded at the foundation's expense.

King's Scholars are entitled to use the letters 'KS' after their name and they can be identified by a black gown worn over the top of their tailcoats, giving them the nickname 'tugs' (Latin: togati, wearers of gowns); and by a surplice in Chapel. The house is looked after by the Master in College. They include many of the most academically gifted boys in the school.

==== Oppidans ====
As the school grew, more pupils were allowed to attend provided that they paid their own fees and lived in boarding-houses within the town of Eton, outside the college's original buildings. These pupils became known as Oppidans, from the Latin word oppidum, meaning "town". The houses developed over time as a means of providing residence for the Oppidans in a more congenial manner, and during the 18th and 19th centuries the housemasters started to rely more for administrative purposes on a senior female member of staff, known as a "dame", who became responsible for the physical welfare of the boys. (Some houses had previously been run by dames without a housemaster.) Each house typically contains about 50 boys. Although classes are organised on a school basis, most boys spend a large proportion of their time in their house.

Not all boys who pass the college election examination choose to become King's Scholars, which involves living in "College" with its own ancient traditions, wearing a gown, and therefore a degree of separation from the other boys. If they choose instead to belong to one of the 24 Oppidan houses, they are simply regarded as Oppidans. However, they may still earn a non-financial award that recognises their academic capabilities. This is known as an Oppidan Scholarship. The title of Oppidan Scholar is awarded for consistently performing with distinction in school and external examinations ("Trials"): to earn the title, a boy must obtain either three distinctions in a row or four throughout his school career. Within the school, an Oppidan Scholar is entitled to use the post-nominal letters OS. Historically, the title "Oppidan Scholar" was awarded to boys who were successful in the Foundation Scholarship election examination but had chosen not to take that scholarship up. Later, the title was also awarded to some boys who had achieved academic distinction during their school career. Since 2018, Oppidan Scholarships have not been awarded on entry on the basis of the Foundation Scholarship examination. The title "Oppidan Scholar" is currently only awarded based upon achieving a "Distinction" (the top class) in a certain number of Trials (the internal examinations held twice a year), or an equivalent performance in external examinations. A boy will be considered for the title after receiving four Distinctions (or three consecutively).

Each Oppidan house is usually referred to by the initials (forenames and surname) of its current housemaster, a senior teacher ("beak"), or more formally by his surname alone, not by the name of the building in which it is situated. Houses occasionally swap buildings according to the seniority of the housemaster and the physical desirability of the building. The names of buildings occupied by houses are used for few purposes other than a correspondence address. They are: Godolphin House, Jourdelay's (both built as such c. 1720), Hawtrey House, Durnford House (the first two built as such by the Provost and Fellows, 1845, when the school was increasing in numbers and needed more centralised control), The Hopgarden, South Lawn, Waynflete, Evans's, Keate House, Warre House, Villiers House, Common Lane House, Penn House, Walpole House, Cotton Hall, Wotton House, Holland House, Mustians, Angelo's, Manor House, Farrer House, Baldwin's Bec, The Timbralls, and Westbury.

==== House structure ====
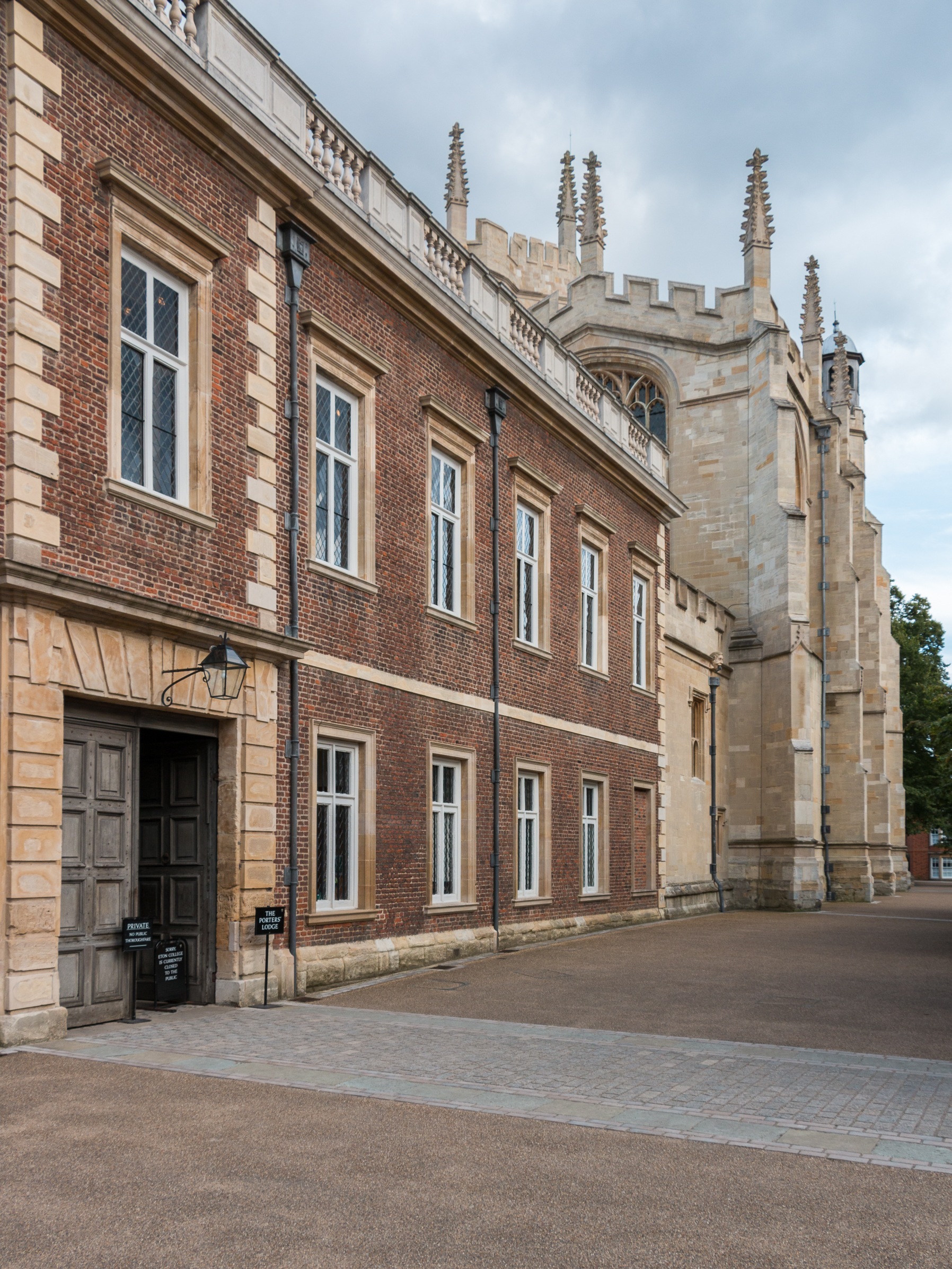
The Porter's Lodge of Eton College

In addition to the housemaster, each house has two house captains, two house captains of games and a house captain of arts. All house positions are entitled to "Stick-Ups" (a white bow tie and winged collar). Some houses may have more house captains than the standard rule. House prefects were once elected from the oldest year, but this no longer happens. The old term "Library" survives in the name of the room set aside for the oldest year's use, where boys have their own kitchen and living space. Similarly, boys in their penultimate year have a room known as "Debate".

There are entire house gatherings every evening, usually around 8:05–8:30 p.m. These are known as "Prayers", due to their original nature. The house master and boys have an opportunity to make announcements, and sometimes the boys provide light entertainment. For much of Eton's history, junior boys had to act as "fags", or servants, to older boys. Their duties included cleaning, cooking, and running errands. A Library member was entitled to yell at any time and without notice, "Boy, Up!" or "Boy, Queue!", and all first-year boys had to come running. The last boy to arrive was given the task. These practices, known as fagging, were partially phased out of most houses in the 1970s. Captains of house and games still sometimes give tasks to first-year boys, such as collecting the mail from the school office.

There are many inter-house competitions, mostly in sports but also in academics, drama and music.

=== Headmasters ===
The Head Master is a member of the Headmasters' and Headmistresses' Conference and the school is a member of the Eton Group of independent schools in the United Kingdom. The school appointed its first female Lower Master (deputy head), Susan Wijeratna, in 2017. She was succeeded by Paul Williams in 2023 as she took on the role of headmistress at Latymer Upper School.

=== Former pupils ===
Eton has a long list of distinguished former pupils. In 2019, Boris Johnson became the 20th British prime minister to have attended the school, and the fifth since the end of the Second World War. Previous Conservative leader David Cameron was the 19th British prime minister to have attended the school, and recommended that Eton set up a school in the state sector to help drive up standards.

=== Reputation ===
Eton has been described as the most famous public school in the world, and has been referred to as "the chief nurse of England's statesmen". Eton has educated generations of British and foreign aristocracy. William, Prince of Wales, his son Prince George of Wales and brother Prince Harry, Duke of Sussex, have been educated at Eton, in contrast to the royal tradition of male education at either naval college or Gordonstoun, or by tutors.

Eton charges up to £65,673 per year (£21,891 per term, with three terms per academic year, for 2026/27). It was the sixth most expensive Headmasters' and Headmistresses' Conference boarding school in the UK in 2013–14.

The Good Schools Guide called the school "the number one boys' public school", adding that "The teaching and facilities are second to none." The school is a member of the G30 Schools Group. Eton today is a larger school than it has been for much of its history. In 1678, there were 207 boys. In the late 18th century, there were about 300, while today, the total has risen to over 1,300.

The school is included in The Schools Index as one of the 150 best private schools in the world and among top 30 senior schools in the UK. In September 2025 Eton was shortlisted for the 2026 'Tatler Schools Guide', along with Caterham, Brighton, Canford and Gresham's, as one of the five best public schools in the country.

=== Financial support ===
About 20% of pupils at Eton receive financial support, through a range of bursaries and scholarships. A recent Head Master, Tony Little, said that Eton was developing plans to allow any boy to attend the school whatever his parents' income and, in 2011, said that around 250 boys received "significant" financial help from the school. In early 2014, this figure had risen to 263 pupils receiving the equivalent of around 60% of school fee assistance, whilst a further 63 received their education free of charge. Little said that, in the short term, he wanted to ensure that around 320 pupils per year receive bursaries and that 70 were educated free of charge, with the intention that the number of pupils receiving financial assistance would continue to increase. The Orwell Award is a sixth form scholarship awarded to boys in UK state schools whose academic performance may have been held back by personal circumstance. Boys who earn this award attend the school on a 100% bursary.

=== Grounds ===
The grounds of Eton College are a registered historic park and garden of about 18 hectares on the north bank of the River Thames. The grounds combine medieval courts, formal gardens and playing fields and have been integral to the college since its foundation. By the late seventeenth century, two principal gardens had been laid out north of the main buildings: the Provost's Garden and what is now the Head Master's Garden. These were later joined by the Fellows' (now Vice-Provost's) Garden and Luxmoore's Garden on an island in the Thames. The Provost's Garden includes the sunken King of Siam's Garden, created in 1929 in honour of King Prajadhipok (Rama VII), an Old Etonian who funded the redevelopment of the former stable yard. The rectangular terrace features mixed borders and provides the setting for the Novi Fundatores wall commemorating major benefactors of the college. The Fellows' Garden, raised above surrounding parkland and enclosed by walls, is planted with specimen trees such as London plane and cedar and offers views towards the chapel and Windsor Castle. The King of Siam's Garden, the Fellows' Garden and other areas were replanted in the early twenty-first century by garden designer James Alexander-Sinclair.

Luxmoore's Garden occupies an island in the Thames to the south-east of the college buildings and features informal lawns, shrubberies, specimen trees and a late-Victorian summerhouse. The gardens are private but are regularly opened to the public through the National Garden Scheme.

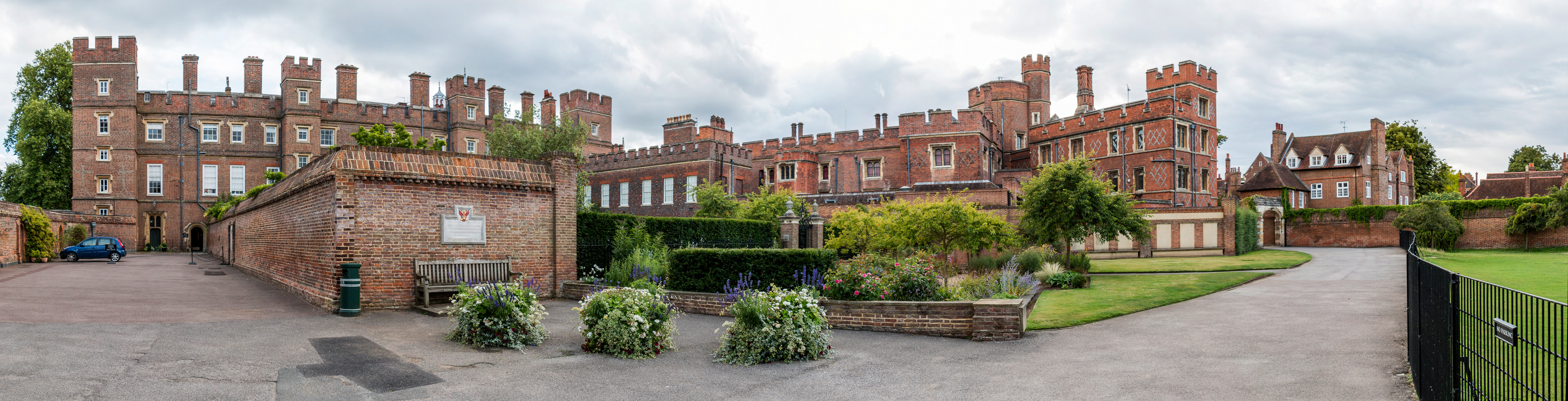
Panoramic view looking across the Provost's Garden. The sunken King of Siam's Garden lies behind the brick wall at centre-left. Above the bench is a large commemorative stone plaque bearing the Garuda emblem of Siam.

=== Changes to the school ===
Registration at birth, corporal punishment, and fagging are no longer practised at Eton. Academic standards were raised, and by the mid-1990s Eton ranked among Britain's top three schools in getting its pupils into Oxford and Cambridge.

The proportion of boys at the school who were sons of Old Etonians fell from 60% in 1960 to 20% in 2016. This has been attributed to a number of factors, including: the dissolution of the house lists, which allowed Old Etonians to register their sons at birth, in 1990; harder entrance examinations as the emphasis on academic attainment increased; a sharp rise in school fees increasingly beyond the means of many UK families; and increased applications from international, often very wealthy, families.

=== School terms ===
There are three academic terms (known as halves) in the year:

- The Michaelmas Half, from early September to mid-December. New boys are now admitted only at the start of the Michaelmas Half, unless in exceptional circumstances.
- The Lent Half, from mid-January to late March.
- The Summer Half, from late April to late June or early July.

They are called halves because the school year was once split into two halves, between which the boys went home.

== School life ==
=== Uniform ===
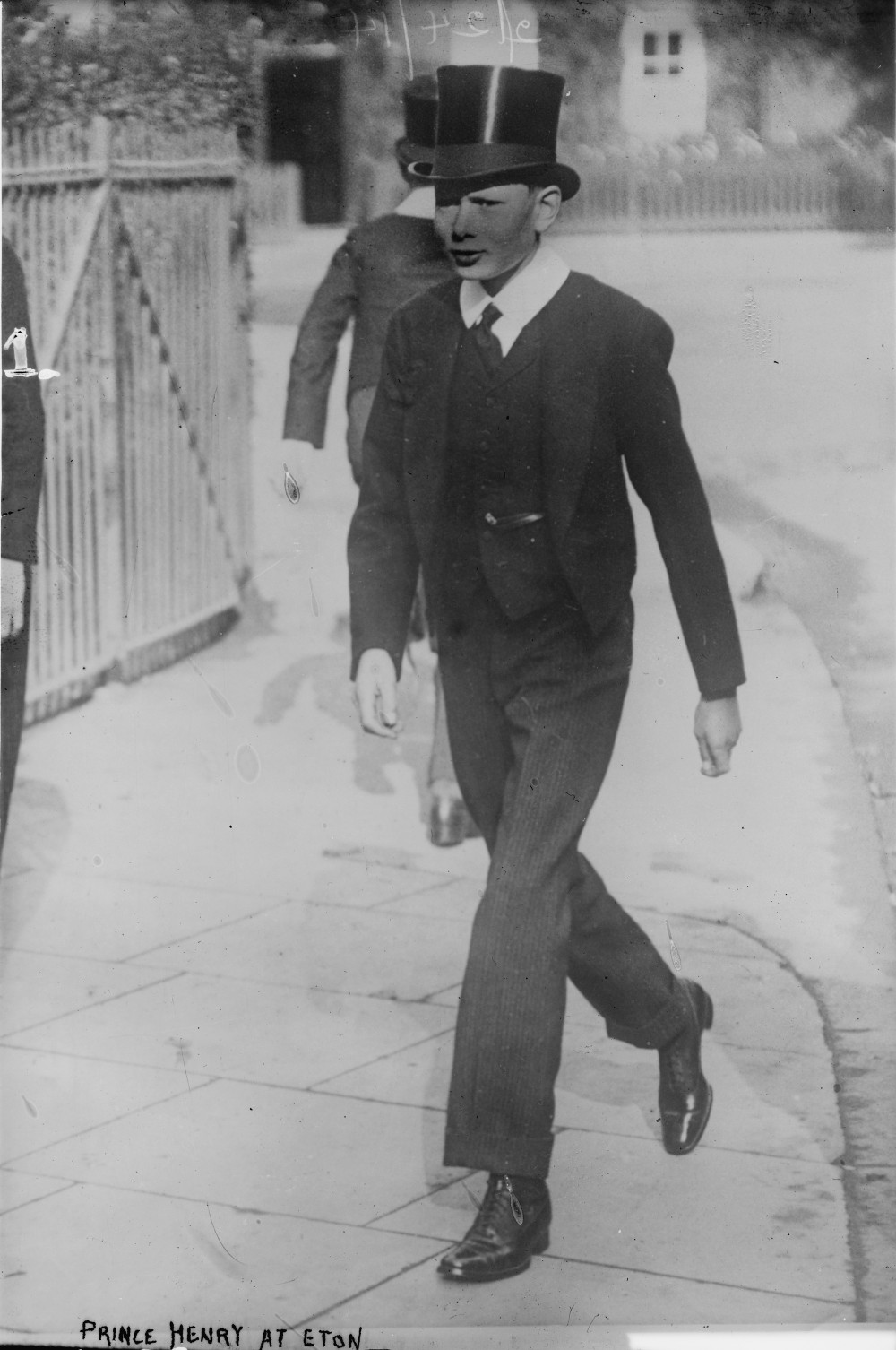
Prince Henry, Duke of Gloucester in a 1914 dress of a junior Eton pupil, wearing a top hat, neck-tie and "bum-freezer", none of which are now worn

The school is known for its traditions, including a uniform of black tailcoat (or morning coat) and black waistcoat, a starched stiff collar and black pinstriped trousers. Most pupils wear a white "tie" which is a narrow strip of cloth folded over the joint of the collar to hide the collar stud, but some senior boys are entitled to wear a white bow tie and winged collar ("Stick-Ups"). These include boys part of select prefect bodies, those who represent their house as a type of House Captain (general, sports or arts) and those who are "keepers" of areas of the school. There are some variations in the school dress worn by boys in authority; see School Prefects and King's Scholars sections.

The long-standing belief that the present uniform was first worn as mourning for the death of King George III in 1820 is unfounded. In 1862, Edward Balston, Head Master, noted little in the way of uniform in an interview with the Clarendon Commission.

Lord Clarendon: One more question, which bears in some degree upon other schools, namely with regard to the dress. The boys do not wear any particular dress at Eton?

Edward Balston: No, with the exception that they are obliged to wear a white neckcloth.

Lord Clarendon: Is the colour of their clothes much restricted?

Edward Balston: We would not let them wear for instance a yellow coat or any other colour very much out of the way.

Lord Clarendon: If they do not adopt anything very extravagant either with respect to colour or cut you allow them to follow their own taste with respect to the choice of their clothes?

Edward Balston: Yes.

Lord Lyttelton: They must wear the common round hat?

Edward Balston: Yes.

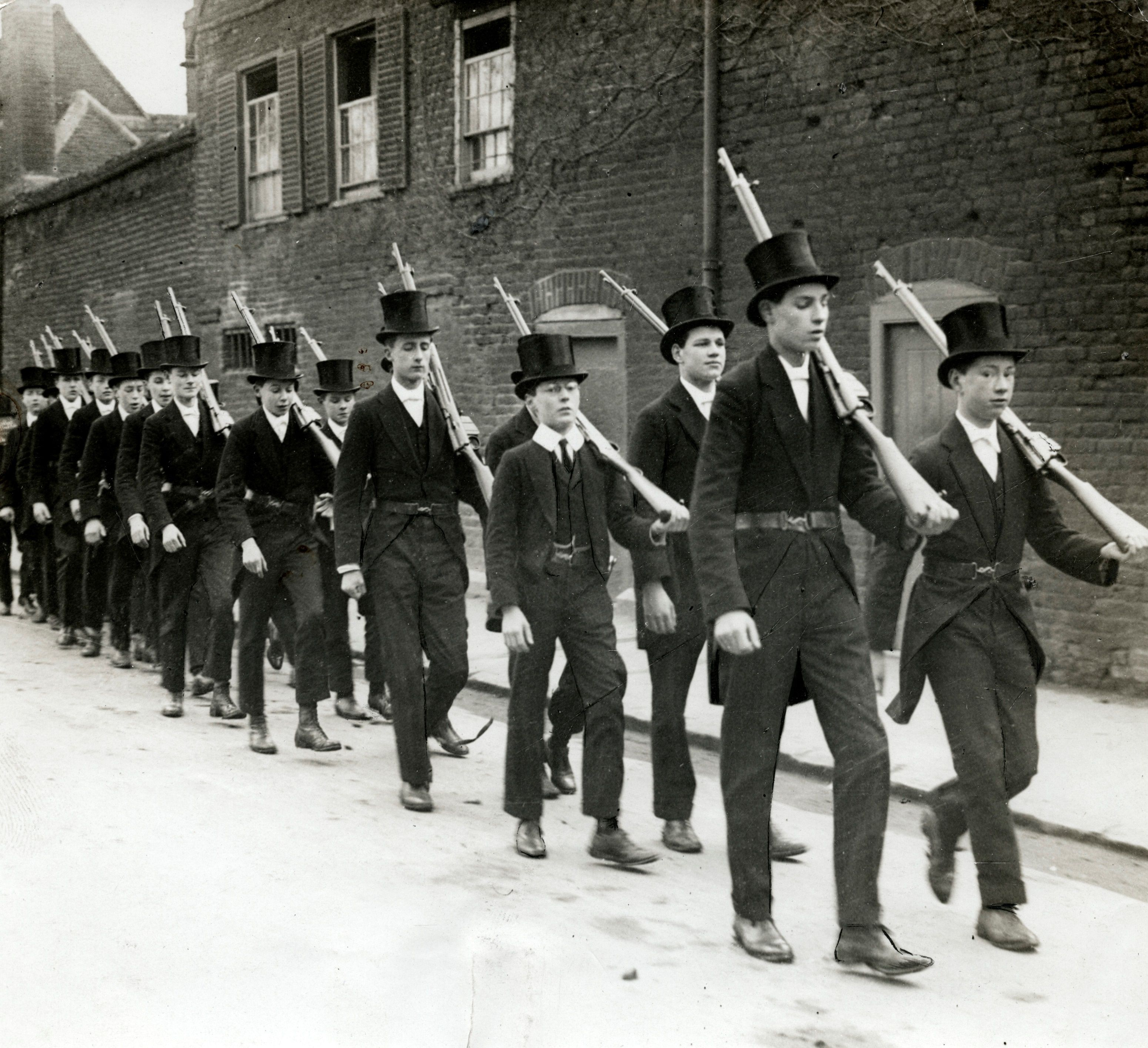
Eton College pupils preparing for military service during World War I in 1915

The uniform worn today was gradually adopted and standardised towards the end of the nineteenth century. Until 1967, boys under the height of 5 ft 4 in (163 cm) wore a cropped jacket (known as an Eton jacket, mess jacket, or "bum-freezer") instead of a tailcoat.

=== Tutors and teaching ===
Teachers are known officially as "Masters" but may also be referred to unofficially as "beaks". The pupil to teacher ratio is 8:1, which is extremely low by typical UK school standards. Class sizes start at around twenty to twenty-five in the first year and are often below ten by the final year.

The original curriculum concentrated on prayers, Latin and devotion, and "as late as 1530 no Greek was taught". Later the emphasis was on classical studies, dominated by Latin and Ancient History, and, for boys with sufficient ability, Classical Greek. From the latter part of the 19th century this curriculum has changed and broadened: for example, there are now more than 100 students of Chinese, which is a non-curriculum course. In the 1970s, there was just one school computer, in a small room attached to the science buildings. It used punched tape to store programmes. Today, all boys must have laptop computers and are given iPads for their school work, and the school fibre-optic network connects all classrooms and all boys' bedrooms to the internet.

The primary responsibility for a boy's studies lies with his House Master, but he is assisted by an additional director of studies, known as a tutor. Classes, formally known as "divisions" ("divs") or "schools", are organised on a school basis; the classrooms are separate from the houses. New blocks of classrooms have appeared approximately every decade since the construction of New (mathematics) Schools, designed by Henry Woodyer and built 1861–63. Despite the introduction of modern technology, the external appearance and locations of many of the classrooms have remained unchanged for a long time. The oldest classroom still in use, "Lower School", dates from the 15th century, though this is now used more for religious services and as a detention centre.

Every evening, about 75 minutes, known as Quiet Hour, is set aside, during which boys are expected to study or prepare work for their teachers if not otherwise engaged. Specialists (boys in sixth form) are not obliged to observe Quiet Hours but must still remain quiet and respectful during the allocated time. Some Houses, at the discretion of the House Master, may observe a second Quiet Hour after prayers in the evening. This is less formal, with boys being allowed to visit each other's rooms to socialise if neither boy has work outstanding. The Independent Schools Inspectorate's report for 2016 says, "The achievement of pupils is exceptional. Progress and abilities of all pupils are at a high level. Pupils are highly successful in public examinations, and the record of entrance to universities with demanding entry requirements in the United Kingdom and overseas is strong."

In 2017, a science, technology, engineering, and mathematics (STEM) schools skills ranking table, designed to show employability, showed the school performed disproportionally badly, falling to 109th place and behind many state schools. Edwina Dunn, the chairwoman of the company producing the report, called for schools to be reassessed based on how suitable pupils are for businesses in the post-Brexit world.

=== School publications ===
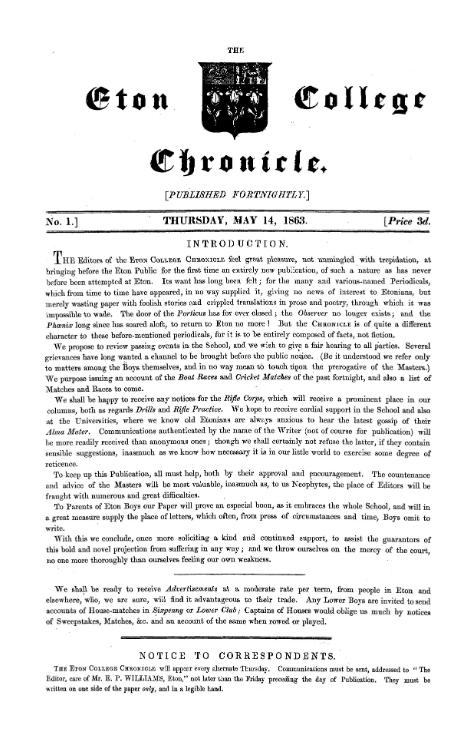
Front page of The Chronicle from 14 May 1863

The Chronicle is the official school magazine, having been founded in 1863. It is edited by boys at the school. Although liable to censorship, it has a tradition of satirising and attacking school policies, as well as documenting recent events. The Oppidan, founded in 1828, was published once a half; it covered all sport in Eton and some professional events as well, but ceased to exist until a recent revival in 2023. The Junior Chronicle is the official school magazine of Lower Boys (pupils in their first two years at Eton) and it is written, edited and designed solely by them. In 2022, the Press Office became known as the Eton College Journalism Association. A totally boy-run team, headed by a Master, now runs the publication which reports on notable events across school life and societies, serving as an important summary of all that happens within the school.

Other school magazines, including The Academic Yearbook, The Arts Review, and The Eton Zeitgeist have been published, as well as publications produced by individual departments such as The 1440 Review (history), The Agathon (philosophy), The Axiom (mathematics), Scientific Etonian (science), The Ampersand (English), Biopsy (medicine), The Lexicon (modern languages) and The Etonal (music). Online publications also include EtonSTEM (STEM subjects) and The Florentina (environmental).

=== Societies ===
At Eton, there are many organisations known as 'societies', in many of which pupils come together to discuss a particular topic or to listen to a lecture, presided over by a senior pupil, and often including a guest speaker. As of September 2024, there are 80 clubs, activities and societies in existence, catering for a wide range of interests and largely run by boys.

=== Grants and admissions ===
Prizes are awarded on the results of trials (internal exams), GCSE and AS-levels. In addition, many subjects and activities have specially endowed prizes, several of which are awarded by visiting experts. The most prestigious of these is the Newcastle Scholarship. The Newcastle Scholarship is awarded on the strength of an examination, consisting of two papers in philosophical theology, moral theory and applied ethics. The Keynes Prize is awarded on an examination of a particular topic within the branch of Economics.

The Rosebery Prize for History is awarded on the same day as the Newcastle Scholarship, and follows a similar format of a three-hour exam during the Lent Half (although the Newcastle Scholarship is awarded on the basis of two such examinations). Also of note is the Gladstone Memorial Prize and the Coutts Prize, awarded on the results of trials and AS-level examinations in C block (Year 12); and the Huxley Prize, awarded for a project on a scientific subject. Other specialist prizes include the Newcastle Classical Prize (which was formerly the same prize as the Newcastle Scholarship, but the two were separated as a decreasing number of philosophers were fluent in Latin and Classical Greek); the Queen's Prizes for French and German; the Duke of Newcastle's Russian Prize; the Beddington Spanish Prize; the Strafford and Bowman Shakespeare Prizes; the Tomline and Russell Prizes for Mathematics; the Robert Bridges Prize for English; the Sotheby Prize for History of Art; the Waddington Prize for Theology and Philosophy; the Birley Prize for History; the Rorie Mackenzie Prize for Modern Languages; the Robert Boyle Prize for Physics; the Macmillan Prize for Politics; the Wilder Prize for Theology and the Hervey Verse Prize for poetry in senior years.

Prizes are awarded too for excellence in activities outside of academics. The Loder Declamation Prize is one of the oldest prizes and the most prestigious non-academic prize in the school where boys are required to read a bible passage, a monologue from a Shakespeare play, and a set of prose. Other non-academic prizes are awarded for activities such as painting, sculpture, ceramics, playing musical instruments, musical composition, acting, backstage work, classical and modern language declamation, silverwork, and design.

Various benefactions make it possible to give grants each year to boys who wish, for educational or cultural reasons, to work or travel abroad. These include the Busk Fund, which supports individual ventures that show particular initiative; the C. M. Wells Memorial Trust Fund, for the promotion of visits to classical lands; the Sadler Fund, which supports, among others, those intending to enter the Foreign Service; and the Marsden Fund, for travel in countries where the principal language is not English.

=== Incentives and sanctions ===
Eton has a well-established system for encouraging boys to produce high-standard work. An excellent piece of work may be rewarded with a "Show Up", to be shown to the boy's tutors as evidence of progress. If, in any particular term, a pupil makes a particularly good effort in any subject, he may be "Commended for Good Effort" to the Head Master (or Lower Master). If any boy produces an outstanding piece of work, it may be "Sent Up For Good", storing the effort in the College Archives for posterity. This award has been around since the 18th century. As Sending Up For Good is fairly infrequent, the process is rather mysterious to many of Eton's boys. First, the master wishing to Send Up For Good must gain the permission of the relevant Head of Department. Upon receiving approval from the Head of Department, the piece of work will be marked with Sent Up For Good and the pupil will receive a card to be signed by House Master, tutor and division master.

The opposite of a Show Up is a "Rip". This is for sub-standard work, which is sometimes torn at the top of the page/sheet and must be submitted to the boy's housemaster for signature. Boys who accumulate rips are liable to be given a "White Ticket", a form of a progress report which must be signed at intervals by all his teachers and may be accompanied by other punishments, usually involving doing domestic chores or writing lines. In recent times, a milder form of the rip, 'sign for information', colloquially known as an "info", has been introduced, which must also be signed by the boy's housemaster and tutor. Internal examinations are held at the end of the Michaelmas half (i.e. autumn term) for all pupils except those in the last year, and in the Summer half for those in the first, second and fourth years (i.e. those not taking a full set of public examinations). These internal examinations are called "Trials". Boys who fail to achieve a certain mark in a subject in a set of trials are 'flagged', and sometimes asked to revise that subject over the coming holidays to then re-sit the exam at the beginning of the next half.

A boy who is late for any division or other appointments may be required to sign "Tardy Book", a register kept in the School Office, between 7:35 am and 7:45 am, every morning for the duration of his sentence (typically three days). Tardy Book may also be issued for late work. For more serious misdeeds, a boy is placed "on the Bill", which involves him being summoned by the sudden entry of a prefect (Sixth Form Select) into one of his divisions, who announces in a loud and formal tone that at a given time a certain pupil must attend the office of the Head Master, or Lower Master if the boy is in the lower two years, to talk personally about his misdeeds. In such cases the pupil would ordinarily receive a detention of either one or two hours in length, however it is possible for no punishment to be given if a sufficient explanation is provided. The most serious misdeeds may result in expulsion, suspension, or rustication (a form of suspension which doesn't go on one's disciplinary record) or in former times, beating. Conversely, should a master be more than 15 minutes late for a class, traditionally the pupils may claim it as a "run" and absent themselves for the rest of its duration, provided they report their intention so to do at the School Office.

A traditional punishment took the form of being made to copy, by hand, Latin hexameters. Offenders were frequently set 100 hexameters by Library members, or, for more serious offences, Georgics (more than 500 hexameters) by their House Masters or the Head Master. The giving of a Georgic is now extremely rare, but still occasionally occurs.

=== Corporal punishment ===
Eton used to be renowned for its use of corporal punishment, generally known as "beating". In the 16th century, Friday was set aside as "flogging day". A special wooden birching block was used for the purpose, with the boy being directed to fetch it and then kneel over it. John Keate, Head Master from 1809 to 1834, took over at a time when discipline was poor. Until 1964, offending boys could be summoned to the Head Master or the Lower Master, as appropriate, to receive a birching on the bare buttocks, in a semi-public ceremony held in the Library, where there was a special wooden birching block over which the offender was held. Anthony Chenevix-Trench, Head Master from 1964 to 1970, abolished the birch and replaced it with caning, which he administered privately in his office.

Chenevix-Trench also abolished corporal punishment administered by senior boys. Previously, House Captains were permitted to cane offenders over the seat of the trousers. This was a routine occurrence, carried out privately with the boy bending over with his head under the edge of a table. Less common but more severe were the canings administered by Pop (see Eton Society below) in the form of a "Pop-Tanning", in which a large number of hard strokes were inflicted by the President of Pop in the presence of all Pop members (or, in earlier times, each member of Pop took it in turns to inflict a stroke). The culprit was summoned to appear in a pair of old trousers, as the caning would cut the cloth to shreds. This was the most severe form of physical punishment at Eton.

Chenevix-Trench's successor from 1970, Michael McCrum, retained private corporal punishment by masters but this was now administered over the seat of the trousers. By the mid-1970s, the only people allowed to administer caning were the Head Master and the Lower Master.

Corporal punishment was phased out in the 1980s. The film director Sebastian Doggart claims to have been the last boy caned at Eton, in 1984.

=== Prefects ===
In addition to the masters, the following three categories of senior boys are entitled to exercise school discipline. Boys who belong to any of these categories, in addition to a limited number of other boy office holders, are entitled to wear winged collars with bow ties (known as "Stick-Ups").

Pop
officially known as 'Eton Society', a society comprising the most well-regarded, confident and able senior boys. It is a driving ambition of many capable Eton schoolboys to be elected to Pop, and many high-performers who are refused entry to this society consider their careers at Eton a failure. Boris Johnson was a member of Pop, while David Cameron (unlike his elder brother Alexander) failed to be elected – which possibly fed their later political rivalry.

Over the years the power and privileges of Pop have grown. It is the oldest self-electing society at Eton, created in 1811 by Charles Fox Townshend. The rules were altered in 1987 and again in 2005 so that the new intake are not elected solely by the existing year and a committee of masters. Now, it involves a complex process where all boys in C Block, all teachers, Housemasters, Dames, and the current Pop vote for who they think are the best candidates. The Lower Master then compiles all this information and holds a final meeting called the 'Pop Committee', where all members are decided upon, including which of these members are to be chosen as the President of Pop, Chairman of Pop, Captain of the School and Captain of the Oppidans. Members of Pop wear a braided tailcoat (buttonhole), white and black houndstooth-checked trousers, a starched stick-up collar and a white bow-tie, and are entitled to wear flamboyant waistcoats, often of their own design.

Historically, only members of Pop were entitled to furl their umbrellas or sit on the wall on the Long Walk, in front of the main building. However, these traditions have died out. They perform roles at many of the routine events of the school year, including school plays, parents' evenings and other official events, and generally maintain order. Notable ex-members of Pop include the Prince of Wales (unlike his younger brother the Duke of Sussex, who failed to be elected), Hugh Laurie, Eddie Redmayne, Arthur Hallam, William Ewart Gladstone, Stafford Northcote, Lord Rosebery and Tom Hiddleston. The former Provost Lord Waldegrave was both the President of Pop and Captain of the Oppidans.
Sixth Form Select
an academically selected prefectorial group consisting, by custom, of the 10 senior King's Scholars and the 10 senior Oppidan Scholars (though recently, high-achieving pupils who are not King's or Oppidan Scholars have also been admitted entry).

The number of Sixth Form Select has grown over time. Members of Sixth Form Select are entitled to wear silver buttons on their waistcoats. They also act as Praepostors: they enter classrooms in mid-lesson without knocking and ask in a loud and formal tone, "Is (family name) in this division?" followed by "He is to see the Head Master at (time) on the bill" (the Bill, see above). Members of Sixth Form Select also perform "Speeches", a formal event held five times a year, most notably on Fourth of June. The names of members of Sixth Form Select are engraved in the Head Master's Schoolroom.
House Captains
The captains of each of the 25 boys' houses (see above). There are usually either one or two per house. They have little responsibility at a school level, but nonetheless act as representatives of their houses and help maintain order within the house. House Captains are entitled to wear a mottled-grey waistcoat with their house colours at the back. It is possible to belong to Pop, Sixth Form Select and be a House Captain at the same time. It is less common for a House Captain to belong to Pop but it still happens fairly often.

The position of the Head Boys of Eton is divided into four roles: President of Pop, Chairman of Pop, Captain of the School and Captain of the Oppidans. The first two are the leaders of Pop and the latter two are the leaders of Sixth Form Select. Captain of the School and Captain of the Oppidans are also in Pop and in the Monarch (rowing prefect body) ex officio.

In the era of Queen Elizabeth I, there were two praepostors in every form, who noted down the names of absentees. Until the late 19th century, there was a praepostor for every division of the school.

== Extra-curricular activities ==
=== Sports ===
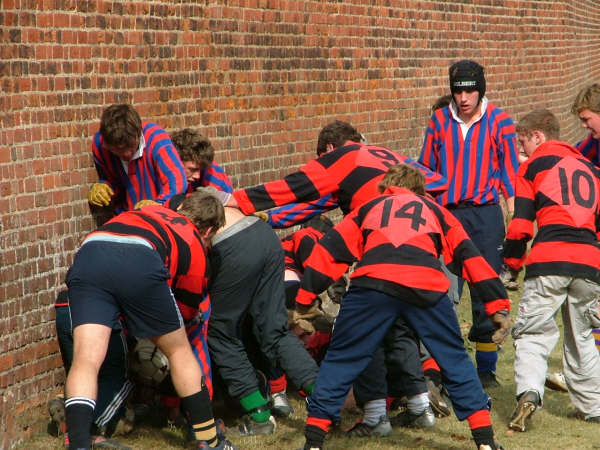
Boys participate in the Eton wall game, 2005

Sport is a feature of Eton, which has nearly 200 acres of playing fields and amenity land. The names of the playing fields include Agar's Plough, Dutchman's, Upper Club, Lower Club, Sixpenny/The Field, and Mesopotamia (situated between two streams and often shortened to "Mespots").

- During the Michaelmas Half, the sport curriculum is dominated by football (called Association) and rugby union, with some rowing for a smaller number of boys.
- During the Lent Half it is dominated by the field game, a code of football, but this is unique to Eton and cannot be played against other schools. However, using strategies from the field game, the Eton football team (Old Etonians F.C.) reached the finals of the FA Cup 6 times, winning twice in 1879 and 1882. During this half, Collegers also play the Eton wall game; this game received national publicity when it was taken up by Prince Harry. Aided by AstroTurf facilities on Masters' field, field hockey has become a major Lent Half sport along with Rugby 7's. Elite rowers prepare for the Schools' Head of the River Race in late March.
- During the Summer Half, sporting boys divide into dry bobs, who play cricket, tennis or athletics, and wet bobs, who row on the River Thames and the rowing lake in preparation for The National Schools Regatta and the Princess Elizabeth Challenge Cup at Henley Royal Regatta.

The rowing lake at Dorney was developed and is owned by the college. It was the venue for the rowing and canoeing events at the 2012 Summer Olympics and the World Junior Rowing Championships. The annual cricket match against Harrow at Lord's Cricket Ground is the oldest fixture of the cricketing calendar, having been played there since 1805. A staple of the London society calendar since the 1800s, in 1914, its importance was such that over 38,000 people attended the two days' play, and in 1910 the match made national headlines but interest has since declined considerably, and the match is now a one-day limited overs contest. In the 2024 match, Harrow were the victors.

In 1815, Eton College documented its football rules, the first football code to be written down anywhere in the world. Eton Match was the annual cricket match between Eton and Winchester held at each school alternately. First played in 1826, it was originally just the cricket match, held over two days, with a dinner or concert or dance on one of the evenings. Eton Match, as such, ceased to exist by 2001.

There is a running track at the Thames Valley Athletics Centre and an annual steeplechase. The running track was controversial as it was purchased with a £3m National Lottery grant with the school getting full daytime use of the facilities in exchange for £200k and 4.5 acres (1.8 hectares) of land. The bursar claimed that Windsor, Slough and Eton Athletic club was "deprived" because it did not have a world-class running track and facilities for training and the Sports Council agreed, saying the whole community would benefit. However Steve Osborn, director of the Safe Neighbourhoods Unit, described the decision as "staggering" given substantial reduction in youth services by councils across the country. The facility which became the Thames Valley Athletics Centre opened in April 1999.

Eton's Shooting VIII competed in the Ashburton Shield for many decades against the other major public schools. In July 1935, the "Public School Rivalry" was reported thus: "Charterhouse, Harrow, Winchester, Eton, Rugby and Clifton, all previous winners, were determined to add to their laurels" in the competition. Eton reportedly drew with Charterhouse and beat Clifton in the July 1939 competition held at Bisley. As with the other schools, Eton's cadet corps sent a team of eight men – the Shooting VIII – to compete annually at Bisley.

Among the other sports played at Eton is Eton Fives.

=== Olympic rowing ===
In 2006, six years before the 2012 London Summer Olympics and London 2012 Summer Paralympic Games, Eton completed the construction of Dorney Lake, a permanent, eight-lane, 2,200 metre course (about 1.4 miles) in a 400-acre park. Eton financed the construction from its own funds. Officially known throughout the Games as Eton Dorney, Dorney Lake provided training facilities for Olympic and Paralympic competitors, and during the Games, hosted the Olympic and Paralympic Rowing competitions as well as the Olympic Canoe Sprint event. It attracted over 400,000 visitors during the Games period (around 30,000 per day), and was voted the best 2012 Olympic venue by spectators. Thirty medal events were held on Dorney Lake, during which Team GB won a total of 12 medals, making the lake one of the most successful venues for Team GB. The FISA President, Denis Oswald, described it as "the best-ever Olympic rowing venue". In June 2013, it hosted the World Rowing Cup. Access to the parkland around the Lake is provided to members of the public, free of charge, almost all the year round.

=== Music ===
The current "Precentor" (Director of Music) is Tim Johnson, who took over from Ralph Allwood in September 2011. The school has eight organs and an entire building for music (performance spaces include two concert venues: the Parry Hall and the Concert Hall). The Salata Auditorium (School Hall) is the largest concert venue in the school, seating about 700 people. The College Chapel and Lower Chapel also act as a centre of choral music.

The school has a variety of musical groups, including two chapel choirs, a symphony and chamber orchestra, jazz bands, a marching band, a pipe band, a gospel choir, a pop choir, two a cappella groups and numerous rock bands who regularly perform at open gig nights and more. Music production and technology, as well as musical theatre, have also grown in popularity in recent years. The College Chapel Choir (the main choir of the school) perform three times a week in regular services in College Chapel on top of a rigorous rehearsal schedule. They often perform at other large events such as at St. Andrew's Day, the "Fourth of June", Ascension Day, the Carol Service, Remembrance Day, and joint evensongs with other chapel choirs, such as those of Winchester College and St. George's Chapel. The Symphony Orchestra performs at the end of every term in a large School Concert, which always includes a piece featuring a large solo number performed by a boy. The Summer term School Concert also consists of the "Vale", the Eton Boating Song, which is sung by the most esteemed singers in B Block as they prepare to leave the school. Both the choir (and its complementary boy-run a cappella group, the "Incognitos") and the orchestra regularly tour internationally to countries such as France, Spain, Portugal, Romania, Latvia, the USA and Hong Kong. Many instruments are taught, including obscure ones such as the didgeridoo.

The school participates in many national competitions; many pupils are part of the National Youth Orchestra and National Youth Choir. The school gives scholarships and exhibitions for dedicated and talented musicians, as well as honorary exhibitions for boys who have proven their musical ability throughout their time at Eton, though these provide no financial benefit directly. Those with a scholarship or exhibition are entitled to have the post-nominal letters MS or ME depending on what form of award they have. Every year a choral scholarship is also awarded to someone who has proven exceptional choral and singing abilities, but then not in other fields of music. Recipients of this award have typically been choristers at top collegiate and cathedral choirs across the country, such as those of Westminster Cathedral and St. Paul's Cathedral. Many boys go on to continue singing in choirs as choral scholars or playing the organ as organ scholars at Oxford and Cambridge. Former Precentor Ralph Allwood set up and organised Eton Choral Courses, now the Rodolfus Foundation, which run at the school, as well as at Oxford and Cambridge amongst other venues, every summer.

Every two year, Eton employs a 'Composer-in-Residence', an external professional composer on a two-year contract who normally commissions new music for the main choir, as well as teaching Music GCSE and A Level to most year groups. In 2009, the school's musical protégés came to wider notice when featured in a TV documentary A Boy Called Alex. The film followed an Etonian, Alex Stobbs, a musician with cystic fibrosis, as he worked toward conducting the difficult Magnificat by Johann Sebastian Bach. Other notable musical prodigies at the school include piano prodigy Ryan Wang who joined the school in September 2020, now under the guidance of Ms. Jennie-Helen Moston. The school has produced many famous musicians in its history, including Hubert Parry, the writer of the hymn "Jerusalem" and the coronation anthem "I was glad".

=== Drama ===
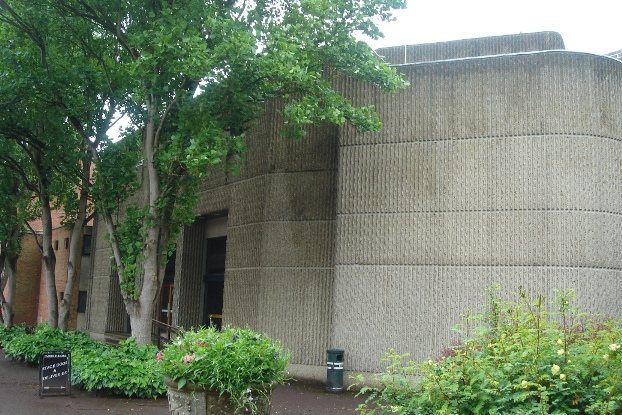
The exterior of Eton's main theatre, the Farrer

Numerous plays are put on every year at Eton College; there is one main theatre, called the Farrer (seating 400) and 2 Studio theatres, called the Caccia Studio and Empty Space (seating 90 and 80 respectively). There are about 8 or 9 house productions each year, around 3 or 4 "independent" plays (plays produced, directed and funded by boys) and three school plays, one specifically for boys in the first two years, and two open to all years. The school plays have such good reputations that they are normally fully booked every night.

In recent years, the school has put on a musical version of The Bacchae (October 2009) as well as productions of A Funny Thing Happened on the Way to the Forum (May 2010), The Cherry Orchard (February 2011), Joseph K (October 2011), Cyrano de Bergerac (May 2012), Macbeth (October 2012), London Assurance (May 2013), Jerusalem (October 2013), A Midsummer Night's Dream (May 2014), Antigone (October 2015), The Government Inspector (May 2016), Romeo and Juliet (May 2017), Beaux Stratagem (October 2021), Vernon God Little (May 2022), Equus (October 2022), Ink (May 2023), After Life (May 2024) and Jack Absolute Flies Again (October 2024). On top of this, the school also holds a fringe-style School Play Festival every few years, where pupils and teachers write, direct and act in their own plays, hosted over the period of a week. The most recent one was held in October 2023, which hosted a wide variety of plays, from a comedy sketch, to a double bill of a musical and Eton's first dance performance.

Previously, the school used to cast girls in female roles from neighbouring schools, but more recently, these roles have been taken up by versatile actors at the school. Boys from the school are also responsible for the lighting, sound, stage management, costume and set design, and makeup of all the productions, under the guidance of several professional full-time theatre staff.

Every year, Eton employs a 'Director-in-Residence', an external professional director on a one-year contract who normally directs one house play and the Lower Boy play (a school play open solely to the first two-year groups), as well as teaching Drama and Theatre Studies to most year groups.

The drama department is headed by Rebecca Farley and several other teachers; Simon Dormandy was on the staff until late 2012. The school offers GCSE drama and A Level Theatre Studies.

Several actors, including Dominic West, Tom Hiddleston, Eddie Redmayne, Damian Lewis, and Hugh Laurie, attended the school.

== Celebrations ==
Eton's best-known holiday takes place on the so-called "Fourth of June", a celebration of the birthday of George III, Eton's greatest patron. This day is celebrated with the Procession of Boats, in which the top rowing crews from the top four years row past in vintage wooden rowing boats. After a normal chapel service, boys may attend a series of musical concerts, film screenings, sports displays, and "Speeches" performed by Sixth Form Select, before they gather on Agar's Plough for lunch in stalls. The 'Five Point' challenge is a tradition attempted by many boys the night before the "Fourth of June", where boys have to try and sneak out of their boarding house at night without being caught by their Housemaster or the security guards on patrol. The aim is to visit five notable points across and take photos there; some of these 'points' include the athletic centre, the roof of Bekynton (the school canteen), Windsor Bridge, and even the statue of King Henry VI in School Yard. Similar to the King's Official Birthday, the "Fourth of June" is no longer celebrated on 4 June, but on the Saturday before the start of the Summer term set of trials. Eton also observes St. Andrew's Day, on which the Eton wall game is played.

== Charitable status and fees ==
Until December 2010, Eton College was an exempt charity under English law (Charities Act 1993, Schedule 2). Under the provisions of the Charities Act 2006, it is now an excepted charity, and fully registered with the Charities Commission, and is now one of the 100 largest charities in the UK. As a charity, it benefits from substantial tax breaks. It was calculated by David Jewell, former Master of Haileybury, that in 1992 such tax breaks saved the school about £1,945 per pupil per year, although he had no direct connection with the school. This subsidy has declined since the 2001 abolition by the Labour Government of state-funded scholarships (formerly known as "assisted places") to independent schools. However, no child attended Eton on this scheme, meaning that the actual level of state assistance to the school has always been lower. Eton's former Head Master, Tony Little, has claimed that the benefits that Eton provides to the local community free of charge (use of its facilities, etc.) have a higher value than the tax breaks it receives as a result of its charitable status. The fee for the academic year 2023–2024 was £52,749 (approximately US$67,000 or €62,000 as of November 2021), although the sum is considerably lower for those pupils on bursaries and scholarships.

== See also ==
- Eton and Castle, the electoral ward that includes the College
- Eton Boating Song
- Eton College Collections
- Eton mess
- Eton Montem
- Eton Racing Boats
- "The Eton Rifles", a 1979 song by the Jam
- Eton Summer Course
- List of head masters of Eton College
- List of the oldest schools in the United Kingdom
- List of the oldest schools in the world

== Sources ==
- Nevill, Ralph (1911). Floreat Etona: Anecdotes and Memories of Eton College. London: Macmillan. OCLC 1347225.
- McConnell, J. D. R. (1967). Eton: How It Works. London: Faber and Faber. OCLC 251359076.
- "Term dates". Eton College.
