= Frank McGowan =

Frank McGowan may refer to:

- Frank McGowan (priest) (1895–1968), Anglican priest
- Frank McGowan, a character in the 1995 film Village of the Damned
- Beauty McGowan (Frank Bernard McGowan, 1901–1982), American baseball player

== See also ==
- Francis McGowan (disambiguation)
