= Edward Layton =

Edward Layton may refer to:

- Edward Layton (footballer), English footballer
- Edward Layton (priest), English Anglican priest
- Eddie Layton, organ player at Yankee Stadium
