= Harry Carpenter (priest) =

The Ven. Harry William Carpenter , OBE, MA was an Anglican priest: the Archdeacon of Sarum from 1914 until 1936. Born in 1854, he was educated at Peterhouse, Cambridge and ordained in 1879. He was Vicar choral of Salisbury Cathedral from 1879 until his appointment as an archdeacon. He was appointed an Officer of the Order of the British Empire (OBE) in the 1928 Birthday Honours in recognition of many years service on behalf of the troops quartered on Salisbury Plain.

He died on 20 July 1936.

Church of England titles
| Preceded by Francis Lear | Archdeacon of Sarum; 1914–1936 | Succeeded by Percy Dale |
