= William Hony =

William Edward Hony (7 February 1788 – 7 January 1875) was an Anglican priest, Archdeacon of Sarum from 3 August 1846 until 31 December 1874.

Hony was born in Liskeard to Vicar William Hony. He was educated at Exeter College, Oxford, where he matriculated in 1805, graduating B.A. in 1811, and M.A. in 1812, and was a Fellow from 1808 to 1827. He held livings at South Newington and Baverstock. Hony died in 1875 in Salisbury.

Church of England titles
Preceded by Francis Lear (father)	Archdeacon of Sarum; 1846–1875	Succeeded by Francis Lear (son)
