= Archdeacon of Sarum =

Church of England ecclesiastical office

The Archdeacon of Sarum is a senior ecclesiastical officer within the Diocese of Salisbury, England. They are responsible for the disciplinary supervision of the clergy within the five area deaneries of the Sarum archdeaconry, which cover the geographical areas of Alderbury, Chalke (west of Salisbury), Salisbury, Heytesbury and Stonehenge (north of Salisbury).

The post is currently vacant since Alan Jeans' retirement.

== History ==
The first recorded archdeacons in Salisbury diocese occur soon after the Norman Conquest (as they do across England) and there were apparently four archdeacons from the outset. However, no territorial titles are recorded until after c. 1139. The archdeacons at that time were (in order of seniority) the Archdeacons of Dorset, Berkshire, Sarum and Wiltshire.

The position was redefined in 1843, having been previously generally known as the Archdeaconry of Salisbury; the role is now generally called Archdeacon of Sarum, but both names have been used commonly throughout history.

=== Allocation of parishes to deaneries ===
Many changes were made to the allocation of parishes to deaneries in 1951. The parishes of Charlton, Wilsford and North Newnton were transferred from Sarum to the archdeaconry of Wilts in 1955.

== List of archdeacons ==
=== High Medieval ===
Archdeacons in Salisbury diocese:

- ?–bef. 1085: Gunter of Le Mans (Note: Gunter, Robert, Everard, Hubald, Joel, Alexander and Nigel occur as archdeacons in Salisbury diocese without territorial titles, so it is not possible to identify which areas they served.)
- bef. 1089–aft. 1089: Robert (probably archdeacon in Berks)
- bef. 1099–1121 (res.): Everard of Calne (became Bishop of Norwich)
- bef. 1099–bef. 1122 (d.): Hubald (probably archdeacon in Dorset)
- bef. 1121–aft. 1122: Joel
- bef. 1121–1123 (res.): Alexander of Lincoln (became Bishop of Lincoln)
- ?–1133 (res.): Nigel (became Bishop of Ely)

Archdeacons of Salisbury:

- bef. 1133–bef. 1139: Ernald (probably Ernald, later Abbot of Kelso and Bishop of St Andrews) (Note: Ernald, Henry, Jordan and Savaric occur as archdeacons in Salisbury diocese without territorial titles, but their roles as archdeacons over the Salisbury area can be deduced.)
- bef. 1153–aft. 1154: Henry
- bef. 1157–aft. 1173: Jordan (probably later Dean of Salisbury)
- bef. 1184–aft. 1174: Savaric FitzGeldewin (also Archdeacon of Northampton)
- bef. 1180–aft. 1191: Azo
- bef. 1193–aft. 1238: Humphrey of Bassingbourn or de Bassingeburn (previously Archdeacon of Wilts)
- bef. 1241–aft. 1244: Stephen
- bef. 1245–aft. 1271: Nicholas de Capella
- bef. 1275–aft. 1307: Thomas Wychampton or de Wickhampton (alias de Grano)

=== Late Medieval ===
- bef. 1309–aft. 1328: Walter Hervy or Hervey
- ?–1309: Raymond de Planell (never gained possession)
- c. 1312: Raymond Cardinal de Fargis (cardinal-deacon of Santa Maria Nova; claimant)
- bef. 1329–bef. 1348 (d.): Robert Luffenham
- 11 July–25 October 1330: Richard de Bury or d'Aungerville (unsuccessful royal grant; revoked)
- bef. 1348–bef. 1361 (d.): Roger de Kington
- 5 September 1361–aft. 1375: Roger de Cloune
- bef. 1383–1 July 1384 (exch.): Thomas Butiller
- 1 July 1384 – 1402: William Potyn (unsuccessful exchange)
- 1400–1402 (d.): Walter FitzPiers (royal grant)
- 1402–14 December 1404 (exch.): Henry Chichele
- 14–26 December 1404 (exch.): Walter Medford (became Archdeacon of Berkshire)
- 26 December 1404 – 1418 (res.): Simon Sydenham (became Dean of Salisbury)
- 18 April 1418–bef. 1419 (d.): John Holand
- bef. 1419–1419 (d.): John Chitterne
- 9 September 1419 – 1420 (res.): John Stafford
- 7 December 1420 – 1426 (res.): William Alnwick (became Bishop of Norwich)
- 4 July 1426 – 1432 (res.): Alexander Sparrow (became Archdeacon of Berkshire)
- 24 September 1432 – 1433 (res.): John Norton (became Archdeacon of Berkshire)
- 18 October 1433–aft. 1435: Stephen Wilton
- bef. 1439–1441 (res.): Adam Moleyns (became Dean of Salisbury)
- 28 October 1441–bef. 1444 (res.): Richard Andrew
- 21 July 1444–bef. 1446 (res.): Peter Cardinal Barbo, cardinal-deacon of Santa Maria Nova
- 18 July 1446–bef. 1465 (d.): Richard Caunton
- 11 July 1465–bef. 1471 (d.): Roger Radclyffe
- 22 November 1471–?: William Eure
- ?–bef. 1499 (d.): Edmund Chaderton (also Archdeacon of Totnes from 1491 and Archdeacon of Chester from 1493)
- 22 August 1499 – 1503 (res.): Geoffrey Blythe (became Bishop of Coventry and Lichfield)
- 21 November 1503–bef. 1524 (d.): George Sydenham
- 2 March–April 1524 (d.): James Bromwich
- 10 April 1524–bef. 1526 (d.): Henry Rawlyns
- bef. 1535–bef. 1539 (d.): Richard Duck
- 2 August 1539 – 20 July 1546 (res.): Edward Layton

=== Early modern ===
- 20 July 1546–bef. 1554 (deprived): Robert Okinge (deprived)
- 6 July 1554–bef. 1583 (d.): Richard Chaundeler
- 20 January 1583 – 8 March 1615 (d.): Ralph Pickover
- 12 March 1615 – 25 May 1625 (d.): William Barlow
- 27 June 1625–bef. 1643 (d.): Thomas Marler
- 7 August 1643–?: William Buckner
- 24 January 1658 – 16 January 1664 (d.): Anthony Hawles
- 23 January 1664–bef. 1670 (d.): Joshua Childrey
- 30 September 1670 – 27 March 1671 (d.): John Sherman
- 10 May 1671 – 4 June 1674 (d.): John Priaulx
- 12 June 1674 – 29 December 1694 (d.): Thomas Lambert
- 14 January 1695 – 1 November 1710 (d.): Joseph Kelsey
- 6 November 1710 – 1727 (res.): John Hoadly (became Bishop of Ferns and Leighlin)
- 23 September 1727–bef. 1732 (res.): Joseph Sager
- 12 July 1732 – 2 May 1766 (d.): Samuel Rolleston
- 22 May 1766 – 14 May 1804 (d.): William Whitworth
- 9 June 1804 – 10 July 1827 (d.): Charles Daubeny
- 23 July 1827–bef. 1836 (res.): Liscombe Clarke
- 20 December 1836 – 1846 (res.): Francis Lear (became Dean of Salisbury)

From around the time of the 1843 reorganisation, the archdeaconry has become generally known as Sarum rather than Salisbury.

- 3 August 1846 – 31 December 1874 (res.): William Hony

=== Late modern ===
- 1875–19 February 1914 (d.): Francis Lear (son of the above)
- 1914–20 July 1936 (d.): Harry Carpenter
- 1936–1950 (ret.): Percy Dale (afterwards archdeacon emeritus)
- 1951–21 February 1968 (d.): Frank McGowan
- 1968–1979 (ret.): Basil Wingfield Digby
- 1979–1986 (res.): Nigel McCulloch (became Bishop suffragan of Taunton)
- 1986–1998 (res.): Barney Hopkinson (became Archdeacon of Wiltshire)
- 1998–2003: vacant
- 2003–2025: Alan Jeans (retired July 2025)

== Sources ==
- Greenway, Diana E. (1991), Fasti Ecclesiae Anglicanae 1066–1300, vol. 4, pp. 23–25
- Greenway, Diana E. (1991), Fasti Ecclesiae Anglicanae 1066–1300, vol. 4, pp. 31–33
- Horn, Joyce M. (1962), Fasti Ecclesiae Anglicanae 1300–1541, vol. 3, pp. 11–13
- Horn, Joyce M. (1986), Fasti Ecclesiae Anglicanae 1541–1857, vol. 6, pp. 16–17
