= Eton Racing Boats =

Eton Racing Boats Ltd
- Industry: Boat manufacturer
- Founded: Eton, United Kingdom
- Founder: Eton College
- Defunct: February 16, 2007
- Headquarters: Eton, Berkshire
- Products: Rowing boats and accessories
- Website: www.etonracingboats.co.uk

Eton Racing Boats (commonly referred to as ERB) was a manufacturer of racing boats for rowing, based in Eton, United Kingdom. The company was founded by Eton College, who also funded the construction of the Dorney Lake development.

The company ceased trading on Friday 16 February 2007 due to insufficient profits and stiff competition from cheaper good quality rowing equipment. Eric Sims continues to offer equipment supplies via a separate outlet.

The former company website claimed that "boats from the Eton workshops have frequently won Henley medals and world championships". The firm also manufactured and sold range of accessories and other products for the sport, including outriggers, megaphones, coaching launches and pontoons, as well as providing maintenance services.

== Boats ==
A crew from St Edward's School warming up in a four.

Boatbuilding had taken place in the area since the 1800s, with composite racing boats introduced in 1994. Since then, the company developed its range of boats to include eights, fours, pairs and singles, were available in a range of colours and different types for training and racing.
