= Joseph Sager =

The Ven. Joseph Sager (1694–1757) was Archdeacon of Sarum from 1727 to 1732.

Sager was born in Wakefield and educated at Corpus Christi College, Cambridge and ordained in 1720. He was the Incumbent at North Tidworth until 1724; and then a Canon Residentiary at Salisbury Cathedral until his death on 18 July 1757.

Church of England titles
Preceded by John Hoadly	Archdeacon of Sarum; 1727–1732	Succeeded by Samuel Rolleston
