= Alan Jeans =

Anglican Archdeacon

The Reverend Alan Jeans MBE
- Archdeacon of Sarum
- Church: Church of England
- Diocese: Diocese of Salisbury
- In office: 2003–2025 (retired)
- Predecessor: Barney Hopkinson
- Other posts: Diocesan Director of Ordinands (2007–2013); Proctor in Convocation (2000–2005 & 2010–2025)

Orders
- Ordination: 1989 (deacon); 1990 (priest) by John Baker

Personal details
- Born: 18 May 1958 (age 68)
- Denomination: Anglican
- Parents: Brian & Jacqueline Jeans
- Spouse: Anita Hobbs (m. 1981)
- Profession: building surveyor (former)
- Education: Bournemouth and Poole College

Alan Paul Jeans (born 18 May 1958) is a British Anglican retired priest. He was the Archdeacon of Sarum, in the Church of England Diocese of Salisbury, from 2003 until 2025.

== Family and education ==
The son of Brian Edward and Jacqueline Rosemary Jeans, Jeans was educated at Bournemouth School and Bournemouth and Poole College. He was a building surveyor for ten years (1976–1986) — in 1984 he became a Member of both the Incorporated Association of Architects and Surveyors and of the Institution of Building Control Officers. He married Anita Hobbs in 1981 and they have two children.

== Ordained ministry ==
He started training for the ministry in 1986, at Sarum & Wells Theological College, graduating from the University of Southampton with a Bachelor of Theology (BTh) degree in 1989. He was duly made a deacon at Petertide 1989 (1 July) at Salisbury Cathedral and ordained a priest at St Peter's Church, Parkstone (his title church) the Petertide following (30 June 1990) — both times by John Baker, Bishop of Salisbury. Following a curacy at Parkstone with Branksea (1989–1993), he was Priest in charge at Bishops Cannings, All Cannings and Etchilhampton (1993–1998).

From 1998 until 2005, he was the Diocese of Salisbury's Advisor for Parish Development; he remained in that post when he was installed an Honorary Canon of Salisbury Cathedral in 2002 and when he was collated Archdeacon of Sarum in 2003. He graduated Master of Arts (MA) from the University of Wales, Lampeter in 2002/2003. Alongside his archdiaconal post, he has also served as Rural Dean of Alderbury (2005–2007) and as Diocesan Director of Ordinands (2007–2013). Besides his parish and diocesan posts, he has also been an assistant chaplain to Dauntsey's School (1995–2007), and a Proctor in Convocation (2000–2005 and 2010-2025).

Jeans was active in the Army Cadet Force as a chaplain from 2002. He was appointed National Lead Chaplain in 2023 and promoted to chaplain to the forces 2nd class (equivalent in rank to lieutenant colonel; this is the highest rank ever held by a padre in the Army Cadet Force.

Jeans was appointed Member of the British Empire (MBE) of the Military division of the Queen's Birthday Honours List 2021, for service to the Army Cadet Force. He retired in July 2025.
