= Percy Dale =

English Anglican priest

The Ven. Percy John Dale, OBE (23 May 1876 – 22 April 1957) was an English Anglican priest who was Archdeacon of Sarum from 1936–50.

Born in Cheltenham, Dale was educated at Magdalen College, Oxford, and ordained in 1900. He served curacies at Harrow-on-the-Hill and Fittleton, before becoming Rector of Holy Trinity East Grimstead, Wiltshire, a post he held until his archdeacon’s appointment.

Church of England titles
Preceded by Harry Carpenter	Archdeacon of Sarum; 1936–1950	Succeeded by Frank McGowan
