= Henry Hugh Pierson =

English composer

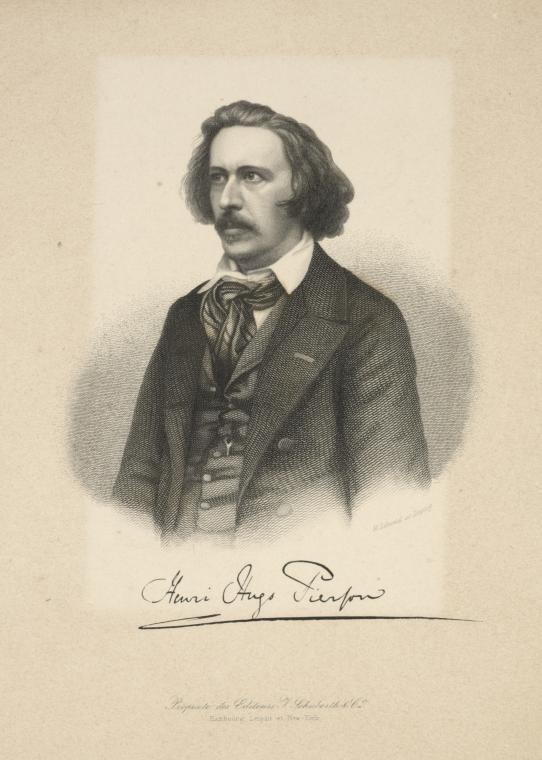
Henry Pierson

Henry Hugh Pierson (12 April 1815 – 28 January 1873) was an English composer resident from 1845 in Germany. He was born Henry Hugh Pearson and his middle name is sometimes given as Hugo. His original name was Henry Hugh Pearson, in Germany he used Heinrich Hugo Pierson. He had success in his adopted country with his operas and songs but little in his own, and his music is now rarely performed.

== Life ==
Pierson was the son of a clergyman, Rev. Dr. Hugh Nicholas Pearson. He was educated at Harrow School and Trinity College, Cambridge, where he studied counterpoint with Thomas Attwood Walmisley. From 1839 to 1844 he studied music in Germany under C. H. Rink, Tomaschek and Reissiger. He also studied in Prague with Václav Tomášek. His amorous adventures included an apparent liaison with Mary Shelley, before he married in 1844. Although elected Reid Professor of Music at Edinburgh University in 1844 he was made to resign when he did not take up his duties and subsequently based himself in Germany. Hubert Parry took lessons with him in 1867.

== Compositions (selective list) ==
Many of Pierson's manuscript full and vocal scores, including those of his oratorios and operas, appear not to have survived. The funeral march Hamlet, Macbeth, Romeo and Juliet and The Maid of Orleans were his only orchestral compositions to be published in full score (copies of which are held by the Library of Congress amongst other locations), whilst Jerusalem and Faust were only published in vocal score, with no orchestral material seeming to be extant. His operas remained unpublished, excepting the libretti. Manuscript material for several works does, however, survive including the Romantische Ouverture (orchestral parts, University Of Pennsylvania Library Ms Coll 217), Salve eternum (full score, Royal College of Music, London, RCM MS 502), the funeral march Hamlet (full score, Landesbibliothek Coburg, Ms Mus 364), the first version of the overture to the opera Leila (full score, Landesbibliothek, Coburg, Ms Mus 369) and the opera Leila (57 orchestral and choral parts, University Library [Carl von Ossietzky Music Department], Hamburg, D-Hs/ ND VII 310).

=== Orchestral works ===
- c.1847 – Leila, overture [first version]
- c.1848 – Romantische Ouverture in D
- c.1848 – Hamlet, funeral march
- 1859 – Macbeth, symphonic poem, Op.54 (fp. Crystal Palace, London, 23 October 1875)
- 1860 – Grisetten-Polka
- c.1865 – Romeo and Juliet, overture, Op.86 (fp. Crystal Palace, London, 7 November 1874)
- 1867 – The Maid of Orleans, overture, Op.101
- c.1870 – As You Like It, overture (fp. Crystal Palace, London, 17 January 1874)
- Julius Caesar, overture

=== Choral works ===
- 1850 – Salve eternum, a Roman dirge for soprano, bass, chorus and orchestra, Op.30 [32 on MS]
- 1852 – Jerusalem, oratorio (fp. Norwich Festival, 23 September 1852)
- 1853 – Paradise, oratorio [unfinished]
- 1869 – Hezekiah, oratorio (fp. Norwich Festival, 1 September 1869) [unfinished, a 'selection' performed]

=== Dramatic works ===
- 1844–45 – Der Elfensieg, opera (fp. Brno, 7 May 1845)
- 1847–48 – Leila, opera (fp. Stadt-Theater, Hamburg 22 February 1848)
- 1854 – Faust (Part II), incidental music (fp. Stadt-Theater, Hamburg, 25 March 1854)
- 1853–72 – Contarini, oder Die Verschwörung zu Padua, opera (fp. Stadt-Theater, Hamburg, 16 April 1872)

=== Vocal works ===
- c.1862 – Mein Herz ist schwer, concert aria for voice and orchestra, Op.66
- c.1862 – Zu Ross, zu Ross (Sturmritt), for voice and orchestra, Op.69
- c.1859 – O Deutschland hoch in Ehren
