= Basil Wingfield Digby =

Stephen Basil Wingfield Digby MBE was an Anglican priest: the Archdeacon of Sarum from 1968 to 1979.

Born on 10 November 1910, he was educated at Marlborough and Christ Church, Oxford. He was ordained in 1937 and his first post was as a curate at St Paul's, Salisbury. After this he was Priest in charge at St George's, Poole and then Vicar of Sherborne. During the war he was a Chaplain to the Forces and was awarded the MBE in 1944.

He died on 22 January 1996.

Church of England titles
Preceded by Frank McGowan	Archdeacon of Sarum; 1968–1979	Succeeded by Nigel Simeon McCulloch
