= O Deutschland hoch in Ehren =

German patriotic song

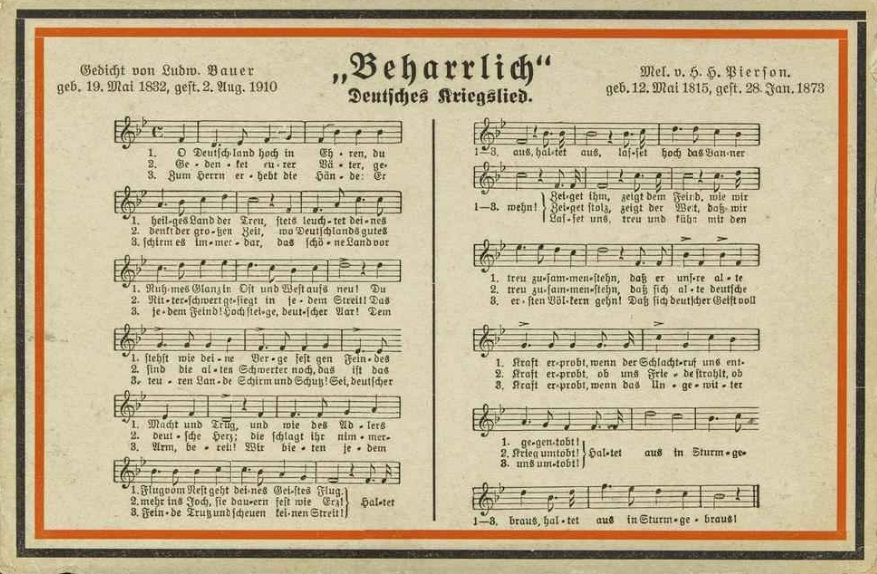
"Beharrlich. Deutsches Kriegslied", postcard from World War I

"O Deutschland hoch in Ehren" is a patriotic German song written by Ludwig Bauer (1832–1910) in 1859 and set to music by Henry Hugh Pierson. The song was, besides the "Deutschlandlied", "Die Wacht am Rhein" and "Des Deutschen Vaterland", the most popular patriotic anthem in the 19th century.

== History ==
In 1858, Henry Hugh Pierson, an English composer resident in Germany, had written a tune for the patriotic song "Ye Mariners of England" by Thomas Campbell. One year later, he met Ludwig Bauer, who later married Pierson's stepdaughter Dorothea Lyser. Pierson asked Bauer to write a German text to the existing tune.

== Lyrics ==
German

I
O Deutschland hoch in Ehren,
Du heil'ges Land der Treu,
Stets leuchte deines Ruhmes Glanz
In Ost und West aufs neu!
Du stehst wie deine Berge fest
Gen Feindes Macht und Trug,
Und wie des Adlers Flug vom Nest
Geht deines Geistes Flug.

Refrain:
Haltet aus! Haltet aus!
Lasset hoch das Banner wehn!
Zeiget ihm, zeigt dem Feind,
Dass wir treu zusammenstehn,
Dass sich unsre alte Kraft erprobt,
Wenn der Schlachtruf uns entgegen tobt!
𝄆 Haltet aus im Sturmgebraus! 𝄇

II
Gedenket eurer Väter,
Gedenkt der großen Zeit,
Da Deutschlands gutes Ritterschwert
Gesiegt in jedem Streit!
Das sind die alten Schwerter noch,
Das ist das deutsche Herz:
Die schlagt ihr nimmermehr ins Joch,
Sie dauern fest wie Erz!

Refrain

III
Zum Herrn erhebt die Hände,
Er schirm' es immerdar,
Das schöne Land, vor jedem Feind.
Hoch steige, deutscher Aar!
Dem teuren Lande Schirm und Schutz
Sei, deutscher Arm, bereit!
Wir bieten jedem Feinde Trutz
Und scheuen keinen Streit.

Refrain

English

I
Oh Germany high in honor,
Thou art the holy land of loyalty.
May the brightness of thy glory
Shine anew forever both in the west and east.
Thou stand'st firm like thy mountains
Against thy foes' power and deception.
And thy spirit may fly
Like the eagle that leaves his nest.

Chorus:
Hold firm! Hold firm!
Let the banner flutter high!
Show them, show the enemy
That we stand together faithfully,
That our old strength persists
When the battlecry rages against us!
𝄆 Hold firm in the roaring storm! 𝄇

II
Remember your fathers,
Remember the great era
When Germany's knightly sword
Was victorious in every battle!
The old swords still exist,
And here is the German heart:
You will never subjugate them
As they are firm like iron.

Chorus

III
Raise your hands to the Lord!
He may forever protect
The beautiful country from every foe.
Fly high, German eagle!
German arm, be prepared
To protect and defend the precious country!
We defy every foe
And do not shun any battle.

Chorus
