= William Henley Pearson-Jervis =

English cleric and ecclesiastical historian (1813–1883)

William Henley Pearson-Jervis (1813–1883) was an English cleric and ecclesiastical historian of France.

== Life ==
The second son of Hugh Nicholas Pearson, he was born on 29 June 1813 at Oxford. In 1824 he was sent to a preparatory school at Mitcham, Surrey, moving two years later to Harrow School. In 1831 he entered Christ Church, Oxford, where illness from spinal complaint lost him a year of study. In June 1835 he graduated B.A. (M.A. 1838); in July of the following year he was ordained deacon, and in 1837 was instituted to the rectory of St. Nicholas, Guildford. He was appointed by his father, then Dean of Salisbury, a prebendary of the collegiate church of Heytesbury, Wiltshire.

In 1848 Pearson married Martha Jervis Markham, daughter of Osborne Markham, a barrister and youngest son of William Markham the Archbishop of York. Osborne Markham's second wife Martha Ricketts was a niece and heiress of Edward Jervis Jervis, 2nd Viscount St Vincent, and on her death in 1865 Pearson assumed the surname of Jervis.

For his health, Pearson and his wife lived abroad for six years (November 1856 to July 1862), mainly in the south of France and in Paris. Here he studied, in the archives of Pau, Bayonne, and other places, as well as in the Bibliothèque Nationale at Paris, papers on the ecclesiastical history of France.

Jervis died on 27 January 1883, in his 70th year. He was buried in Sonning churchyard, near his brother Hugh Pearson. Books collected by Jervis for his church history were presented by his widow to the London Library by his widow, who died 8 March 1888.

== Works ==
Jervis published in 1872 A History of the Church of France from the Concordat of Bologna to the Revolution, 2 vols. Ten years later he published a sequel to this, The Gallican Church and the French Revolution. A shorter work in Murray's series of manuals was The Student's History of France.

== Notes ==
Attribution

This article incorporates text from a publication now in the public domain: Lee, Sidney, ed. (1892). "Jervis, William Henley Pearson-". Dictionary of National Biography. Vol. 29. London: Smith, Elder & Co.
