= Hugh Pearson (dean of Salisbury) =

English cleric

Hugh Nicholas Pearson (1776–1856) was an English cleric, Dean of Salisbury from 1823. He was connected with the Clapham Sect.

== Life ==
The son of Hugh Pearson of Lymington, he matriculated at St John's College, Oxford in 1796, and graduated B.A. in 1800. As a student he was introduced to Isaac Crouch of St Edmund Hall, by a recommendation from Thomas Haweis. He then acted as curate to Richard Cecil in Chobham, and to John Venn in Clapham.

In 1802 Pearson was ordained priest by Brownlow North; Henry Venn the younger recorded that he was nearly rejected, having praised a work of William Wilberforce. He obtained his M.A. in 1803. He spent time in Clapham in 1803, and also 1804–7.

Poor health affected Pearson's ability to work, from 1809. In 1812 he was given the living of Sandford, in the gift of the Duke of Marlborough. He owed this preferment to Ann Kennicott, whom he had met at Windsor where he had been living for his health, and with whom he was linked until her death in 1830, being one of her executors. He resided at Iffley, and his location just outside Oxford led to a college office of proctor at St John's. Shortly he was part of a group of leading evangelicals who set up the Oxfordshire Bible Society.

For the years 1817 to 1822 Pearson was in Brighton, at St James's Chapel. The chapel had been built in 1810, with financial support from the Duke of Marlborough. It had attracted a nonconformist congregation, had been acquired by Nathaniel Kemp, and then was consecrated in the Church of England. Pearson became chaplain to George IV. He received his Bachelor and Doctor of Divinity degrees in 1821.

Pearson was the Dean of Salisbury from 1823 to 1846. In 1834 he was given the living of St Nicolas' Church, Guildford, which passed to his son William in 1837. He retired from the deanship to Sonning.

== Works ==
Christian missions to Asia were one of Pearson's major interests, and he was attending Church Missionary Society meetings by 1804, becoming a committee member in May of that year. He wrote:

- On the Propagation of Christianity in Asia, 1808, Buchanan Prize dissertation. Claudius Buchanan, missionary in Bengal, had offered in 1805 a prize of £500 "for the best composition in English Prose on, 1. The Probable Design of the Divine Providence in subjecting so large a portion of Asia to the British Dominions; 2. The Duty, the Means, and the Consequences of translating the Scriptures into the Oriental Tongues, and of Promoting Christian Knowledge in Asia; 3. A Brief Historic View of the Progress of the Gospel in different Nations since its first Promulgation". It was awarded in 1807 to Pearson.
- Life of Dr. Claudius Buchanan, 1817.
- Memoirs of the Rev. Joseph D. Jænicke, 1833
- Memoirs of the Life and Correspondence of Reverend Christian Frederick Swartz, 1834, on the missionary Christian Friedrich Schwarz

== Family ==
Pearson married Sarah Maria Elliott (1781–1858) of Clapham in 1803. They had four sons and several daughters:

- Charles Buchanan Pearson (1807–1881), rector of Knebworth.
- William Henley Pearson-Jervis, cleric and historian.
- Henry Hugo Pierson, composer.
- Hugh Pearson (1817–1882), vicar of Sonning and canon of Windsor.
- Catherine Mary Pearson (d. 1903 in her 88th year), married William Henry Elliott, Bengal Civil Service.

Sarah Maria was daughter of Charles Elliott, of Grove House, Clapham, and Westfield Lodge, Brighton, by his first wife Sarah Anne Sherman; she was half-sister to Charlotte Elliott, Henry Venn Elliott and Edward Bishop Elliott, children of Charles Elliott's second marriage to Eling Venn, daughter of Henry Venn.

Church of England titles
Preceded by Charles Talbot	Dean of Salisbury; 1823–1846	Succeeded by Francis Lear
