= Eton Summer Course =

Eton Summer Course is a three-week course for Chinese students at Eton College in England. The course has been run every summer since 2005. The aim of the course is to improve students' English and give first-hand exposure to British culture. The course is run by masters of Eton, with students of the school acting as teaching assistants.

The main part of the course is the daily English language classes in small classes to improve students' speaking and listening. To date there has been an average improvement in measured language ability of 25%. The measured improvement goes some way to explaining the popularity of the course, having attracted hundreds of students since 2005.

In addition, extra-curricular activities such as sports and trips to tourist sites are provided. Examples of these trips are to Oxford University, Windsor Castle and London. Other features of the course include public speaking and drama lessons, and lectures about life in the UK.
