= John Sherman (historian) =

English churchman and academic, archdeacon of Salisbury

John Sherman (died 1671) was an English churchman and academic, archdeacon of Salisbury in 1670, known as a historian of Jesus College, Cambridge.

== Life ==
Sherman was a native of Dedham, Essex. He studied at Queens' College, Cambridge, which he entered in September 1645. On 25 October 1650, Sherman was elected to a fellowship at Jesus College. He was incorporated at Oxford on 12 July 1653.

In 1661 he was presented to the university living of Wilmesloe in the diocese of Chester. The Act of Indemnity, however, enabled the former incumbent to retain the living, and Sherman was never instituted. In 1662 his college presented him to the rectory of Harlton in Cambridgeshire, and in the same year he was elected president of the College.

In 1663 Sherman appears as one of the syndics for restoring the library at Lambeth Palace, and in the following year as one of the twelve university preachers. In 1665 he was admitted to the degree of D.D. by royal mandate. In 1670 he was appointed archdeacon of Salisbury. He died in London, 27 March 1671, and was buried in Jesus College chapel.

== Works ==
Sherman's Historia Collegii Jesu Cantabrigiæ was edited by James Orchard Halliwell (London, 1840). It gives an account of Jesus College, Cambridge, from its foundation; and also of the earlier nunnery of St. Rhadegund, which stood on the same site. It went up to the mastership of Edmund Boldero (elected 1663), to whom Sherman dedicated the work.

== Notes ==
Attribution

This article incorporates text from a publication now in the public domain: Lee, Sidney, ed. (1897). "Sherman, John". Dictionary of National Biography. Vol. 52. London: Smith, Elder & Co.
