= Francis McGowan =

Francis McGowan may refer to:

- Francis X. McGowan, member of the New York State Assembly 1943 to 1952, in 164th New York State Legislature
- Francis McGowan, character in Walking to the Waterline

== See also ==
- Frank McGowan (disambiguation)
