= Liscombe Clarke =

The Ven. Liscombe Clarke (24 August 1784 – 17 April 1841) was an Anglican priest. He served as Archdeacon of Sarum from 1827 to 1836. He was also the incumbent at Downton and Biddestone, both in Wiltshire.

Clarke was born in London, the son of Christopher Clarke of Lothbury. He was educated at Winchester College and New College, Oxford. He was a fellow of New College from 1806 to 1815. He earned his B.A. in 1808 and M.A. 1812.

Clarke apparently died in his sleep at the vicarage in Downton, where he was found dead on 17 April 1841. He had shown no signs of illness.

Church of England titles
| Preceded by Charles Daubeny | Archdeacon of Sarum; 1827–1836 | Succeeded by Francis Lear (father) |
