= William Whitworth (archdeacon) =

Anglican priest

The Ven. William Whitworth was an Anglican priest: the Archdeacon of Sarum from 22 May 1766 until his death on 14 May 1804.

Whitworth was educated at Katharine Hall. He was the Incumbent at Stilton. He left £45,000 in his will to his great nephew.

Church of England titles
Preceded by Samuel Rolleston	Archdeacon of Sarum; 1766–1804	Succeeded by Charles Daubeny)
