= Samuel Rolleston =

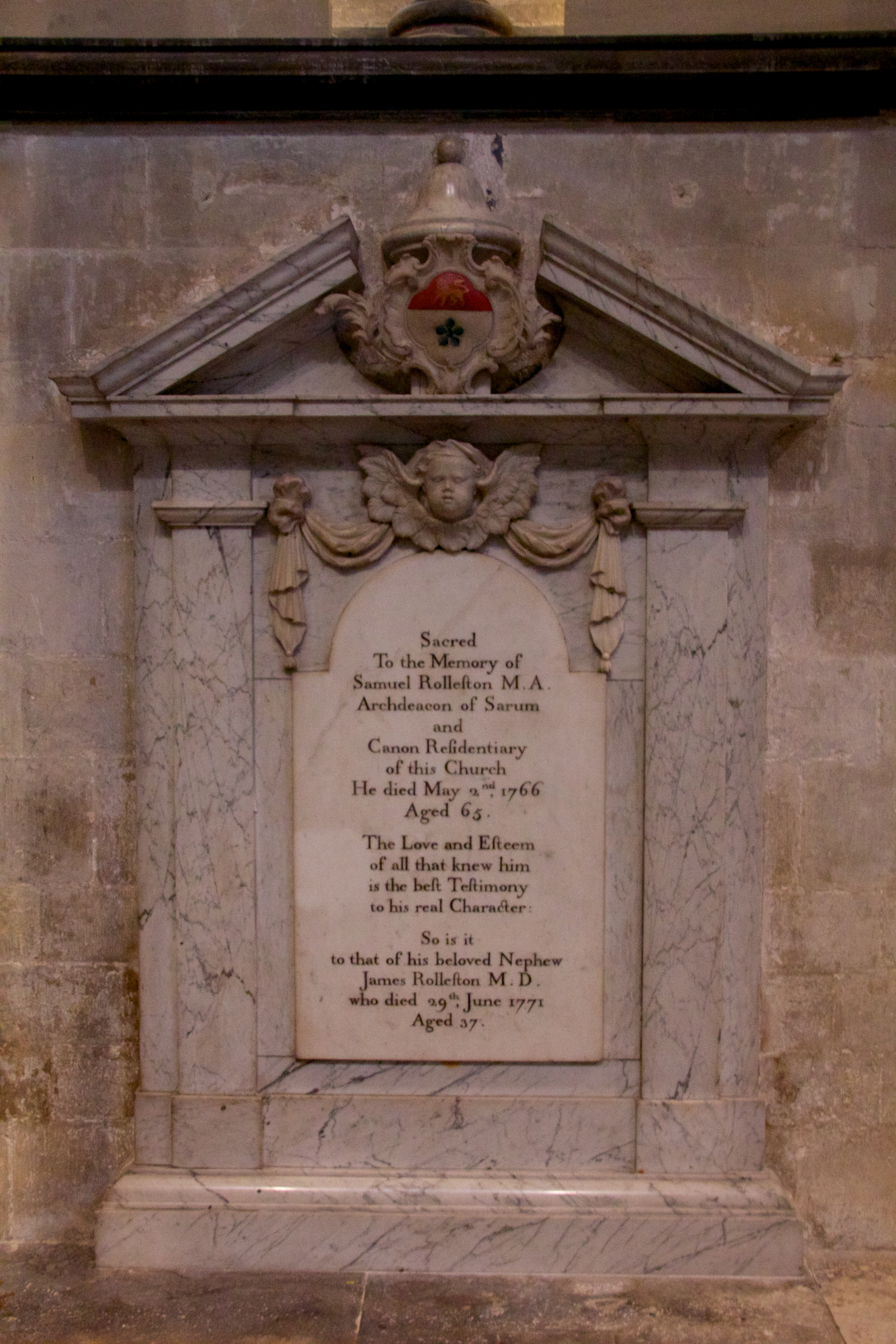
Memorial at Salisbury Cathedral

The Ven. Samuel Rolleston, MA (Oxon), a Canon of Salisbury Cathedral, held livings at Stanton, Derbyshire and Aston upon Trent; and was Archdeacon of Sarum from 12 July 1732 until his death on 2 May 1766.

Church of England titles
Preceded by Joseph Sager	Archdeacon of Sarum; 1732–1766	Succeeded by William Whitworth
