= Henry Rawlyns =

English priest

Henry Rawlins was an English priest in the early 16th century.

Rawlins was educated at the University of Oxford. He became Canon of Sarum in 1512; Rector of Compton Bassett, Wiltshire, in 1521; and Archdeacon of Salisbury in 1524.
