= Edward Layton (priest) =

English Anglican priest

Edward Layton, D.D. was an English Anglican priest in the 16th century.

Layton was born in Surrey and educated at the University of Oxford. He held livings at All Cannings, Wiltshire, and Cheriton, Hampshire. Layton was Archdeacon of Salisbury from 2 August 1539 until his resignation on 20 July 1546.
