= Anthony Hawles =

English priest

Anthony Hawles DD (1609 – 16 January 1664) was a Canon of Windsor from 1660 to 1664 and Archdeacon of Salisbury.

== Career ==
He was born in Winterborne Monkton, Dorset and educated at Queen's College, Oxford where he graduated BA in 1627, MA in 1630 and DD in 1660.

He was appointed:

- Chaplain to King Charles II in his exile
- Archdeacon of Salisbury 1658 – 1664
- Prebendary of Bitton in Salisbury 1660 – 1664
- Rector of Great Knoyle, Wiltshire 1660
- Rector and Vicar of Bishopston, Wiltshire 1662

He was appointed to the eighth stall in St George's Chapel, Windsor Castle in 1660 and held the canonry until 1664.
