= Thomas Marler =

English Anglican priest

Thomas Marler (died 1643) was an English Anglican priest in the 17th century.

He was educated at Trinity College, Oxford, graduating in 1600. He was rector of Lydiard Tregoze, Wiltshire, from 1612 and Archdeacon of Sarum from 1625, holding both posts until his death in 1643.
