= Frank McGowan (priest) =

The Ven. Frank McGowan, MBE (7 October 1895 – 21 February 1968) was an Anglican priest who was the Archdeacon of Sarum from 1951 until his death in 1968.

McGowan was born in Bristol to Henry McGowen, a house painter, and Eliza Mary McGowen. He was educated at St Edmund Hall, Oxford. After World War I service with the Duke of Wellington's Regiment and later the Machine Gun Corps wounded in action he was discharged and awarded a British War Medal, Allied Victory Medal and Discharge badge No 366001. He was ordained in 1923. He was a curate at St Michael and All Angels, Bournemouth before serving incumbencies at St Mark's, Birmingham and then St Nicholas, Cholderton until his archdeacon's appointment.

He was appointed a Member of the Order of the British Empire in the 1945 New Year Honours for his services as Honorary Secretary of the Church of England's Board for the Welfare of Imperial Forces within the Diocese of Salisbury.

He died in Salisbury, aged 72.

Church of England titles
Preceded by Percy Dale	Archdeacon of Sarum; 1951–1968	Succeeded by Basil Wingfield Digby
