= Richard Andrew =

English priest

Richard Andrew (died 1477) was a Canon of Windsor from 1450 to 1455, Archdeacon of Sarum from 1441 to 1444 and Dean of York from 1452 - 1477.

== Career ==
He was appointed:

- First warden of All Souls College, Oxford 1437 - 1442
- Archdeacon of Sarum 1441 - 1444
- Prebendary of Farringdon in Salisbury 1447
- Prebendary of Stratton in Salisbury 1449
- Prebendary of North Grantham in Salisbury 1454
- Prebendary of Warthill in York 1445
- Prebendary of Newbald in York 1449
- Dean of York 1452 - 1477
- Prebendary of Oxton in Southwell 1461 - 1476
- King's secretary
- Rector of Hayes, Kent

He was appointed to the ninth stall in St George's Chapel, Windsor Castle in 1450 and held the canonry until 1455.
