= Francis Lear (dean of Salisbury) =

Francis Lear (1789 in Downton, Wiltshire – 1850 in Salisbury) was Dean of Salisbury in the Church of England from 1846 until his death.

Lear was educated at Oriel College, Oxford, where he matriculated in 1806, and then Magdalen College from 1809, graduating B.A. in 1810, M.A. 1813, and becoming a Fellow in 1819. He held livings in Wiltshire at Chilmark and Bishopstone (near Salisbury). He was Archdeacon of Sarum from 1836 until his appointment as Dean. He died on 23 March 1850.

Lear married Isabella Mary Majendie. Their son, also named Francis, succeeded his father as rector of Bishopstone and was Archdeacon of Sarum from 1875 until his death on 1914.

Isabella paid for the construction in 1854 of All Saints' Church, East Harnham, in memory of her husband; it had been his wish to provide a church for this outlying district of the city.

Church of England titles
Preceded by Liscombe Clarke	Archdeacon of Sarum; 1836–1846	Succeeded by William Hony
Preceded by Hugh Pearson	Dean of Salisbury; 1846–1850	Succeeded by Henry Hamilton
