= Francis Lear (archdeacon of Sarum) =

Anglican Archdeacon

Francis Lear (1823–1914) was an Anglican priest: the Archdeacon of Sarum from 1875 until his death.

Born on 23 August 1823, son of Francis Lear, Dean of Salisbury, he was educated at Winchester and Christ Church, Oxford. Lear made four appearances in first-class cricket in 1843 and 1844, playing for the Marylebone Cricket Club and Oxford University. He was ordained in 1847 and served first as a curate at Bishopstone. He became its Vicar in 1850 and Rural Dean of Chalke in 1852. From 1864 to 1875 he was Precentor of Salisbury Cathedral. He died on 19 February 1914.
