= Robert Byng =

Robert Byng may refer to:

- Robert Byng (16th-century MP) (died 1595), Member of English Parliament representing Steyning and Abingdon
- Robert Byng (Plymouth MP) (1703–1740), British navy official, politician, Governor of Barbados from 1739 to 1740
- Robert Byng (painter) (1666–1720), English painter
