= Johann Zacharias Kneller =

German painter

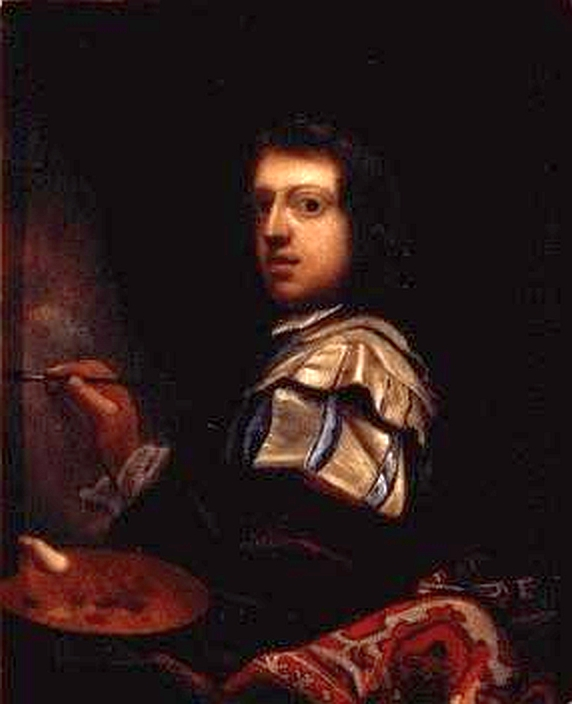
Self-portrait, c. 1684

John Zacharias (Zachary) Kneller, originally Johann Zacharias Kniller (15 December 1642, Lübeck – 1702, London), was a German Baroque painter active in England, best known as the brother of Sir Godfrey Kneller. His youngest brother was organist Andreas Kneller.

== Biography ==
According to Houbraken, he and his brother were born in Lübeck to the underkeeper of the church there. They travelled widely through Italy, England, and the Netherlands but he never achieved the fame of his brother, who had been a Rembrandt pupil.

According to the RKD, he was the older brother and assistant to Godfrey, who travelled to Italy with him during the years 1672–1675. In 1676, he moved to London with him.
