= Portrait of Isaac Newton =

1689 painting by Godfrey Kneller

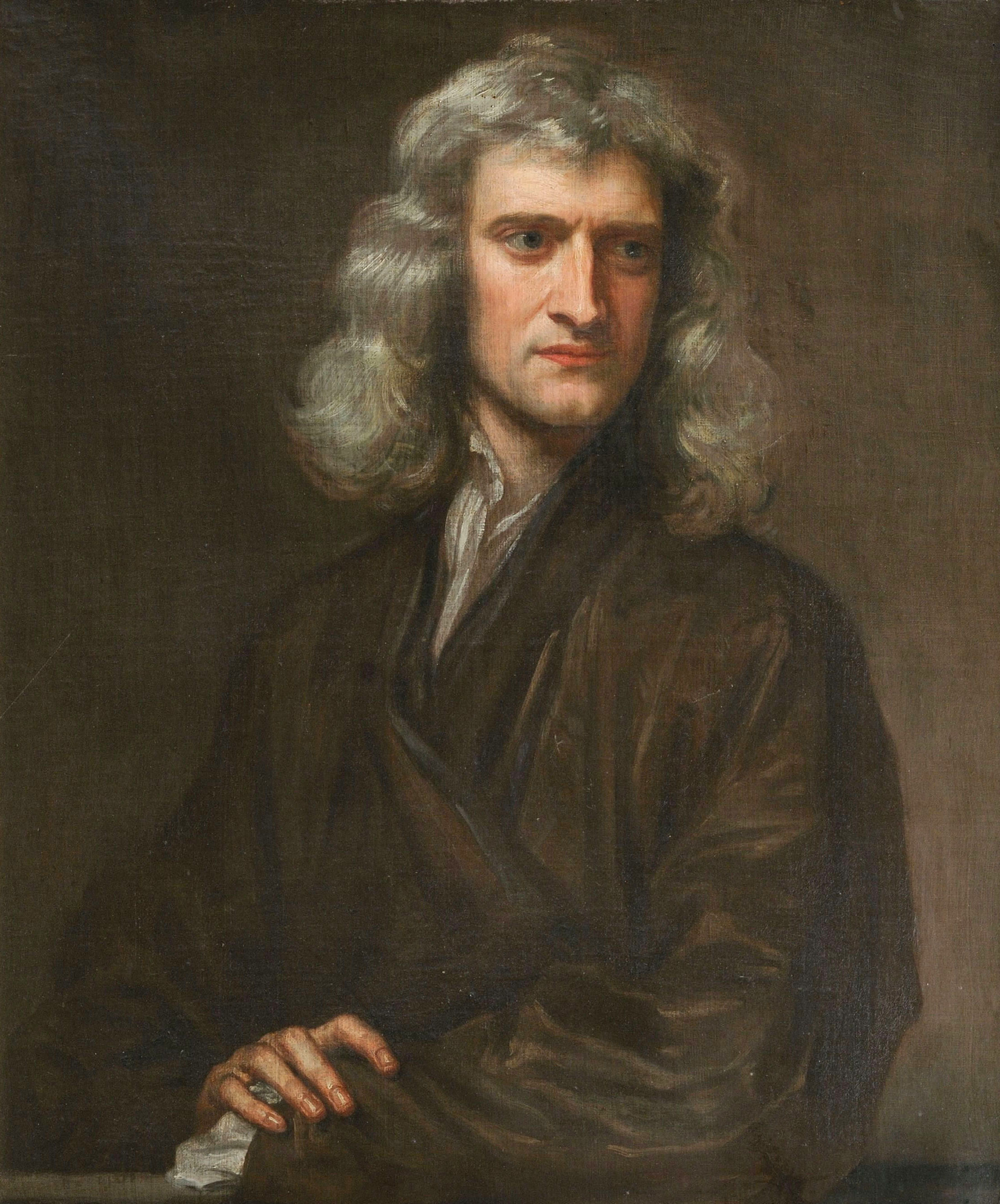
- Artist: Godfrey Kneller
- Year: 1689
- Medium: Oil on canvas
- Dimensions: 76 cm × 64 cm (30 in × 25 in)
- Owner: Private collection

Portrait of Isaac Newton is an oil-on-canvas painting by Godfrey Kneller, from 1689. It depicts the English polymath Isaac Newton (1643–1727) in his forties, who worked on the fields of mathematics, physics, astronomy, alchemy and theology. The Earl of Portsmouth owns this painting.

== History ==
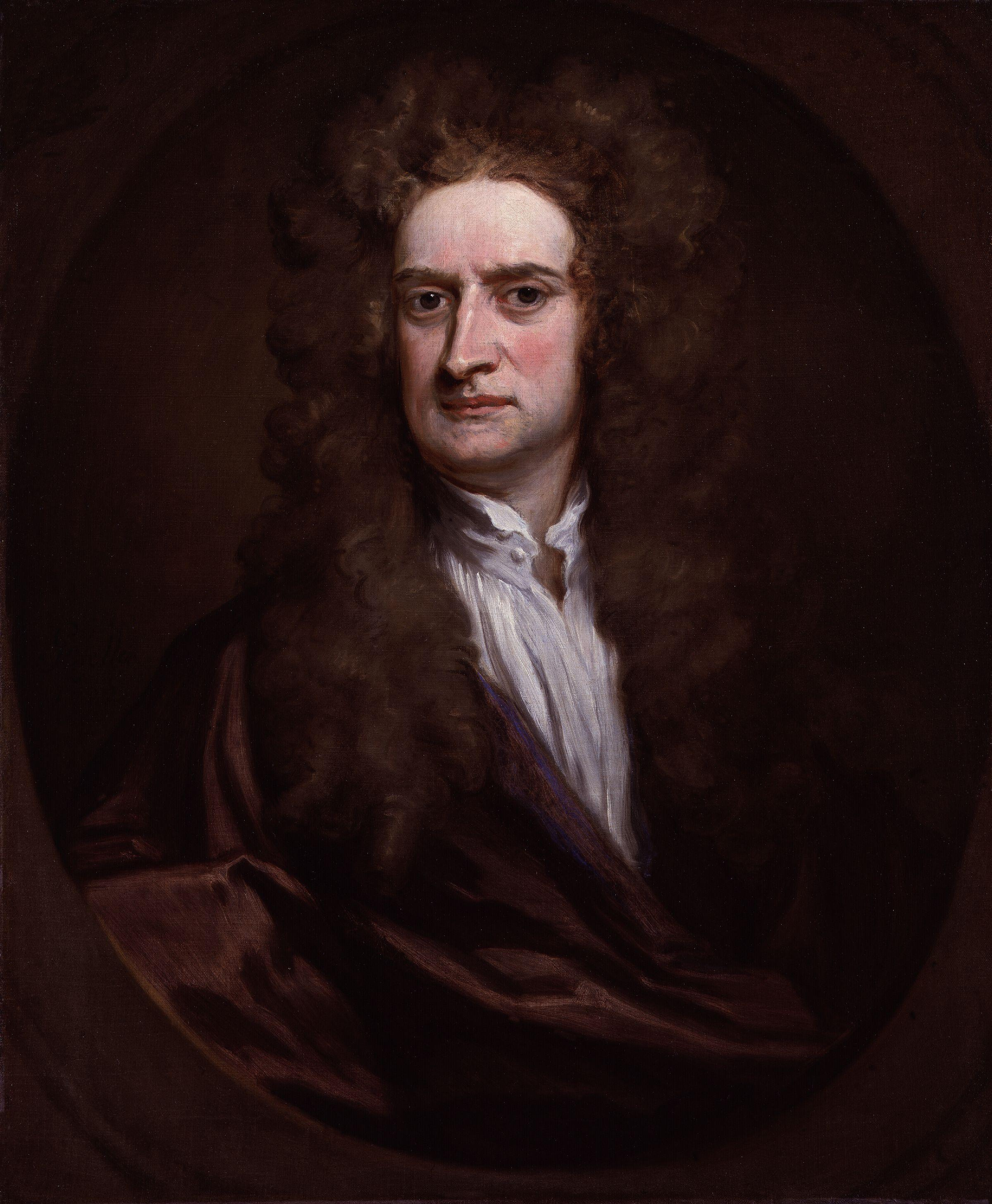
Godfrey Kneller's 1702 portrait of Isaac Newton

The painting was in Newton's home during his lifetime, resulting in it being seen by people close to him but by few others. Instead, a 1702 painting of Newton by Kneller was more famous while Newton was still alive. It took until the 1860s for the painting to gather more widespread attention, at first only in the form of a reproductive engraving in black and white. In 1860 a grandson of the inventor Samuel Crompton gave a photograph of the painting to Bennet Woodcroft, who the next year sent it to the engraver Thomas Oldham Barlow with the intention of engraving it, which the Earl of Portsmouth had consented to. Barlow asked the Earl of Portsmouth for permission for an oil copy to be made, and this was agreed upon. This copy helped increase the public's awareness. This copy of the portrait, along with a print of Barlow's engraving, are now housed at the National Portrait Gallery in London. The portrait is one of the most iconic depictions of Newton.
