= Portrait of John Locke =

1697 painting by Godfrey Kneller

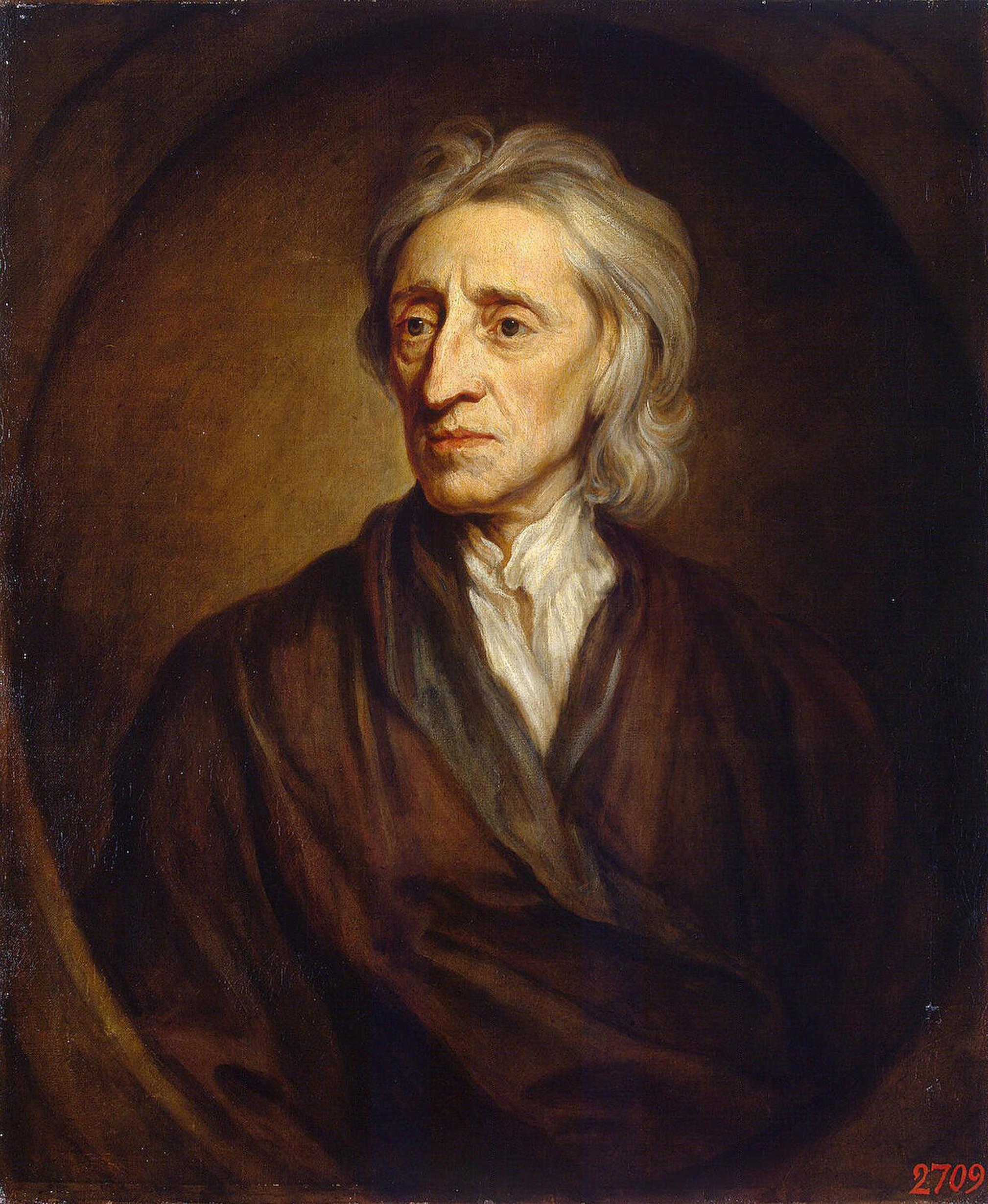
- Artist: Godfrey Kneller
- Year: 1697
- Medium: Oil on canvas
- Dimensions: 76 cm × 64 cm (30 in × 25 in)
- Location: Hermitage Museum, Saint Petersburg, Russia

Portrait of John Locke is an oil on canvas painting by painter Godfrey Kneller, from 1697. It depicts the English philosopher John Locke. It is held in the Hermitage Museum, in Saint Petersburg, Russia.

== History and description ==
Kneller in his work created a portrait gallery of the most important intellectual and artistic personalities of his time in England. The current portrait is from the final years of the philosopher John Locke, when he was around 65 years old, at a time when he was living away from society, in a country estate, with a close circle of friends. The portrait presents the sitter in a discreet manner. Locke is shown in a brown background, also wearing a brown outfit, and looking to his right. Light incides particularly on his face, white hair and collar. However the depiction shows its due reverence to one of the leading English intellectuals of his time. The Hermitage website states: "Yet despite this intimacy and informality, we have a full sense of the importance and weight of the sitter's".

== Provenance ==
The painting was in the collection of Robert Walpole, in Houghton Hall, until it was bought by the Hermitage Museum, in 1779.
