= Robert Byng (painter) =

English painter

Robert Byng (1666–1720) was an English portrait painter.

He was born in Wiltshire, the son of Thomas Byng (or Binge) and his wife Anne. His younger brother Edward Byng (c.1676-1753) was a drapery painter who was the principal assistant to Godfrey Kneller. Robert Byng's works show the influence of Kneller, and many of his drawings in the British Museum are studies of portraits by Kneller, which suggests he may have been a pupil of that artist. He died at Oxford in 1720.

The Philip Mould gallery in London states: "Too little is known of Byng's work as studio assistant to Sir Godfrey Kneller in his last years, and too much indifferent work is attributed to him on the basis purely of convenience".
