= Kit-cat portrait =

Portrait size

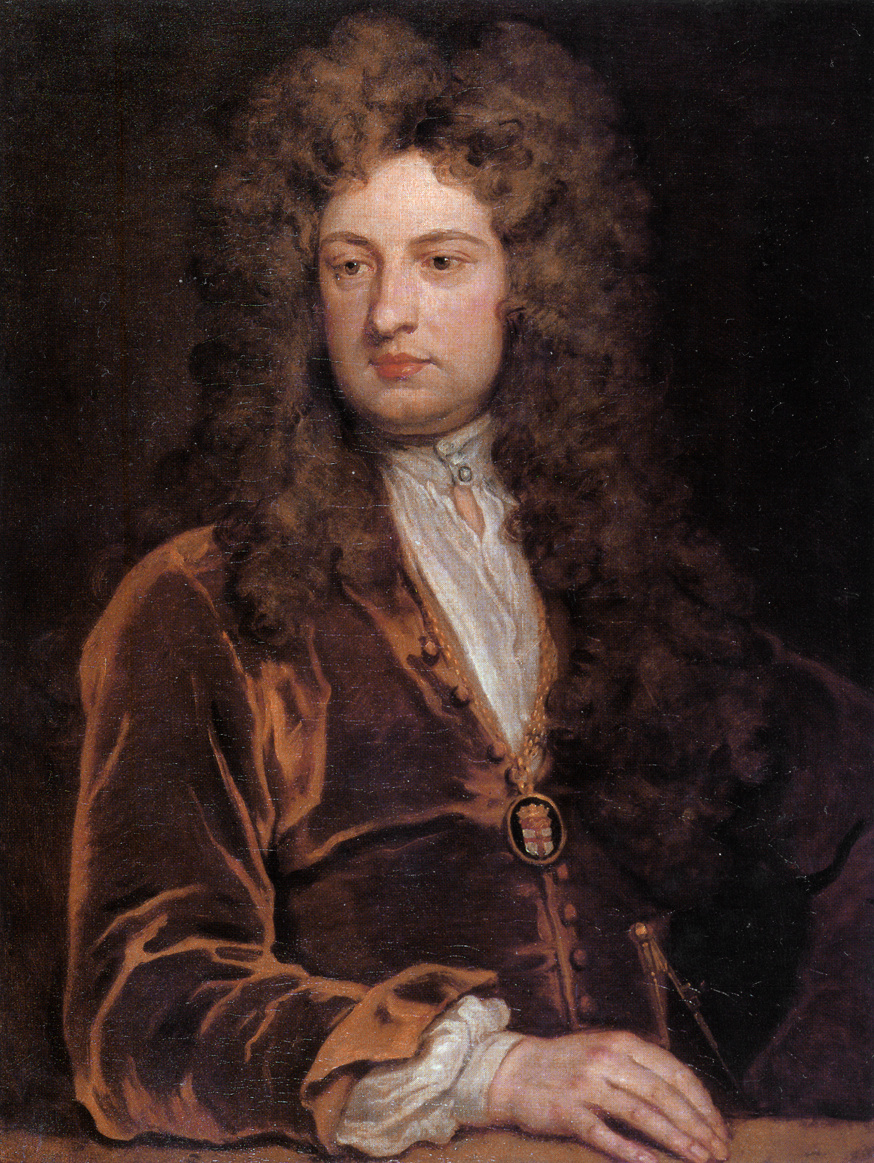
Sir John Vanbrugh in Godfrey Kneller's Kit-cat portrait, considered one of Kneller's finest portraits.

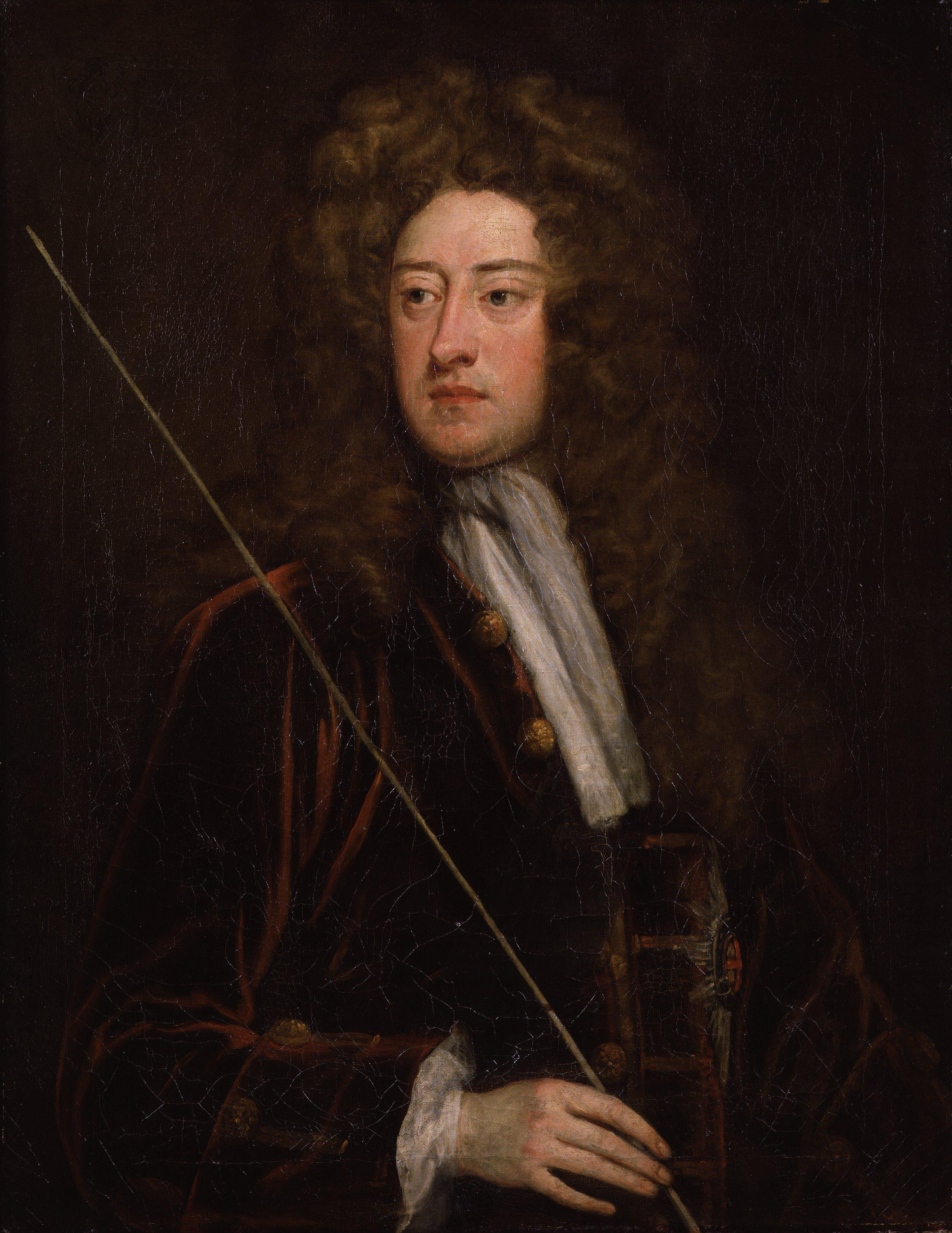
William Cavendish, 2nd Duke of Devonshire by Kneller

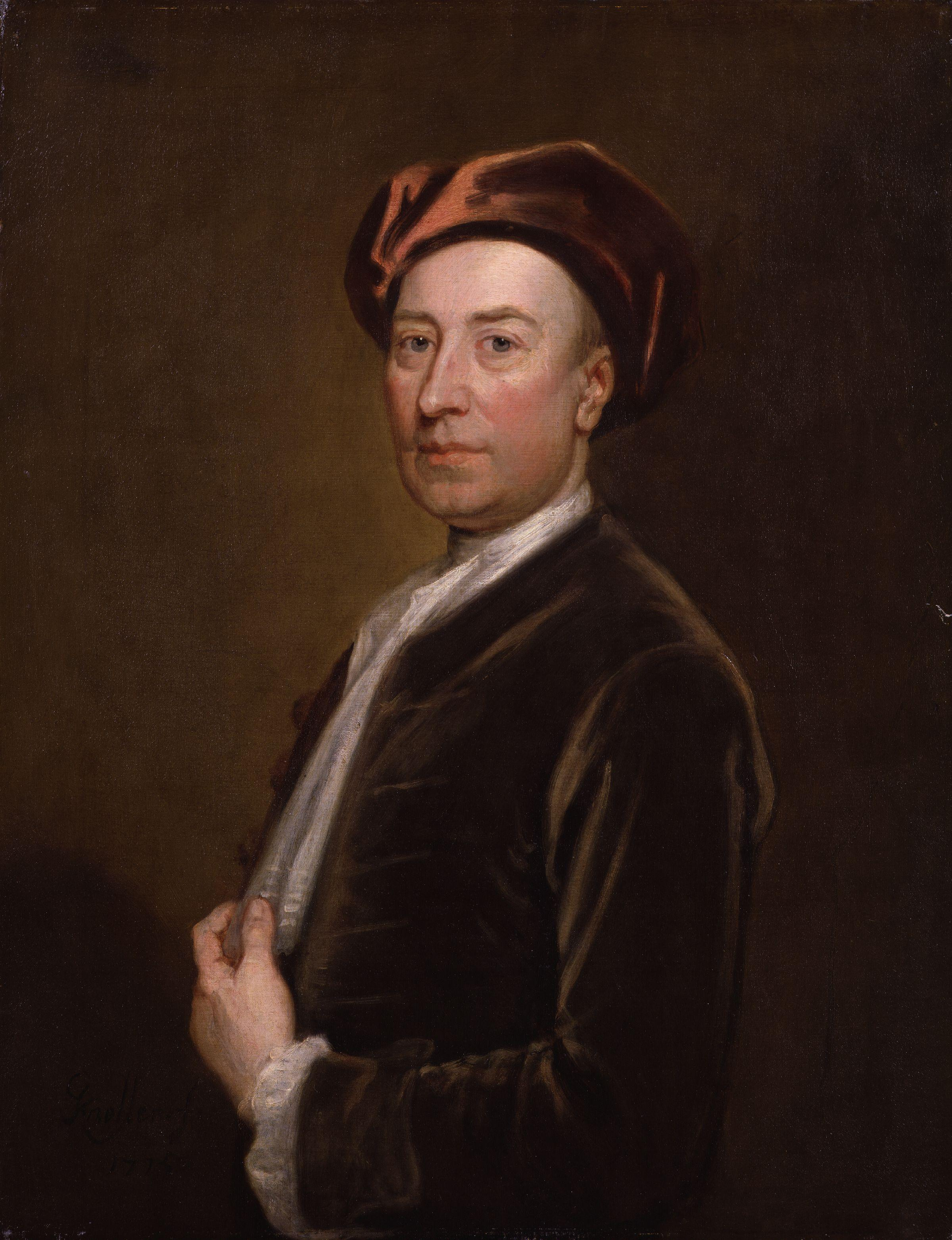
Portrait of Thomas Hopkins by Kneller

A kit-cat portrait or kit-kat portrait is a particular size of portrait, less than half-length, but including the hands. The name originates from a famous series of portraits which were commissioned from Godfrey Kneller for members of the Kit-Cat Club, a Whig dining club, to be hung in their meeting place at Barn Elms. They are now mostly in the collection of the National Portrait Gallery, London, with a selection of about twelve displayed in London and others at their satellite locations, including twenty on display at Beningbrough Hall in North Yorkshire.

== Size ==
Each canvas is thirty-six inches long, and twenty-eight wide. The special Kit-cat portrait size is said to have been determined because the dining-room ceiling of the Kit-cat Club was too low for half-length portraits of the members. Slightly larger than the traditional head and shoulders format, it allows enough space to include one or both hands. So, while the poses in the Kit-cat portraits may look similar, none is actually repeated. When hung together, the overall effect is of a unified club of equals, though each man retains his individuality through distinct gestures, props and costumes.

== Types ==
The Kit-cat portraits, as a whole, can be broken down into three separate types. The first group may be represented by the portrait of John Vanbrugh. Vanbrugh's portrait is the most famous and the style of the painting is the most common.

Subjects wear huge stately wigs and formal clothing. The men painted in this style often look down and off to the left of the view, as if to be day-dreaming or thinking of some grand political scheme. These men are also painted with a ring or pendant, depicting their family crest.

William Cavendish represents the second most popular pose in the series. He is painted with the same stately wig and fine clothing but he holds his staff of office as Lord Steward. His face is also more ruddy than Vanbrugh's, suggesting that he may be younger.

Thomas Hopkins represents the third most popular style. Instead of a wig, Hopkins is bald and sports a red cap but his clothes are the same as his fellow Kit-cats.

The portraits were engraved for Jacob Tonson by John Faber the Younger.
