= Edward Byng =

English artist

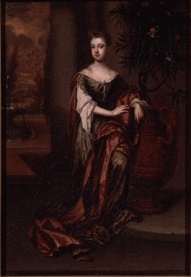
Diana Beauclerk, Duchess of St Albans, by Edward Byng

Edward Byng (ca. 1676 – 1753), sometimes spelt Bing, was an English portrait artist.

Thought to be a native of Wiltshire, Byng trained as an artist and became an assistant to Godfrey Kneller about 1693. Another pupil of Kneller, Robert Byng (fl. 1697–1720) was his brother. At the time of Kneller's death in 1723 Byng was his chief assistant and lived with him at a house in Great Queen Street. Kneller's will recorded that Byng had "for many years faithfully served me", gave him a pension of £100 a year and entrusted him with seeing that Kneller's unfinished work was completed, for which he would receive the outstanding payments. Byng also inherited drawings in Kneller's studio, many now in the British Museum. He later lived at Potterne, near Devizes, where he died in 1753 and was buried.

The British Museum holds a large collection of Byng's sketchbooks and drawings. Like John James Backer he was a drapery painter for Kneller.
