= Godfrey Kneller =

German-born British painter (1646–1723)

Sir Godfrey Kneller Bt
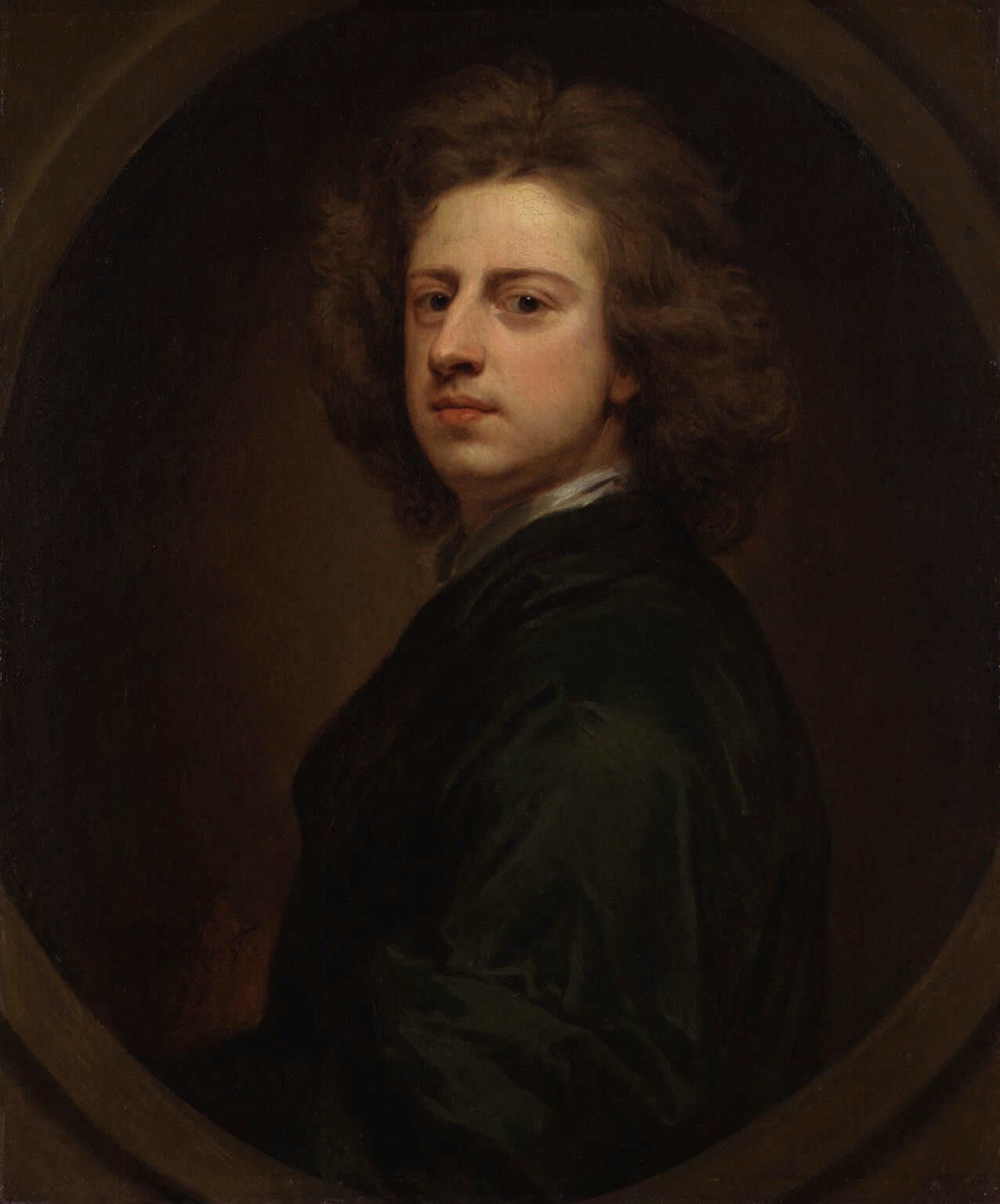
- Self-Portrait, c. 1685
- Born: Gottfried Kniller; 8 August 1646; Lübeck, Holy Roman Empire
- Died: 19 October 1723 (aged 77); London, England
- Known for: Portrait painting
- Spouse: Susanna Grave
- Relatives: Johann Zacharias Kneller (brother); Andreas Kneller (brother)

Sir Godfrey Kneller, 1st Baronet (British English: /ˈnɛlə/ NEL-ə; born Gottfried Kniller; 8 August 1646 – 19 October 1723) was a British painter of German origin. The leading portraitist in England during the late Stuart and early Georgian eras, he served as court painter to successive English and British monarchs, including Charles II of England and George I of Great Britain. Kneller also painted scientists such as Isaac Newton, foreign monarchs such as Louis XIV of France and visitors to England such as Michael Shen Fu-Tsung. A pioneer of the kit-cat portrait, he was also commissioned by William III of England to paint eight "Hampton Court Beauties" to match a similar series of paintings of Charles II's "Windsor Beauties" that had been painted by Kneller's predecessor as court painter, Peter Lely.

== Early life ==
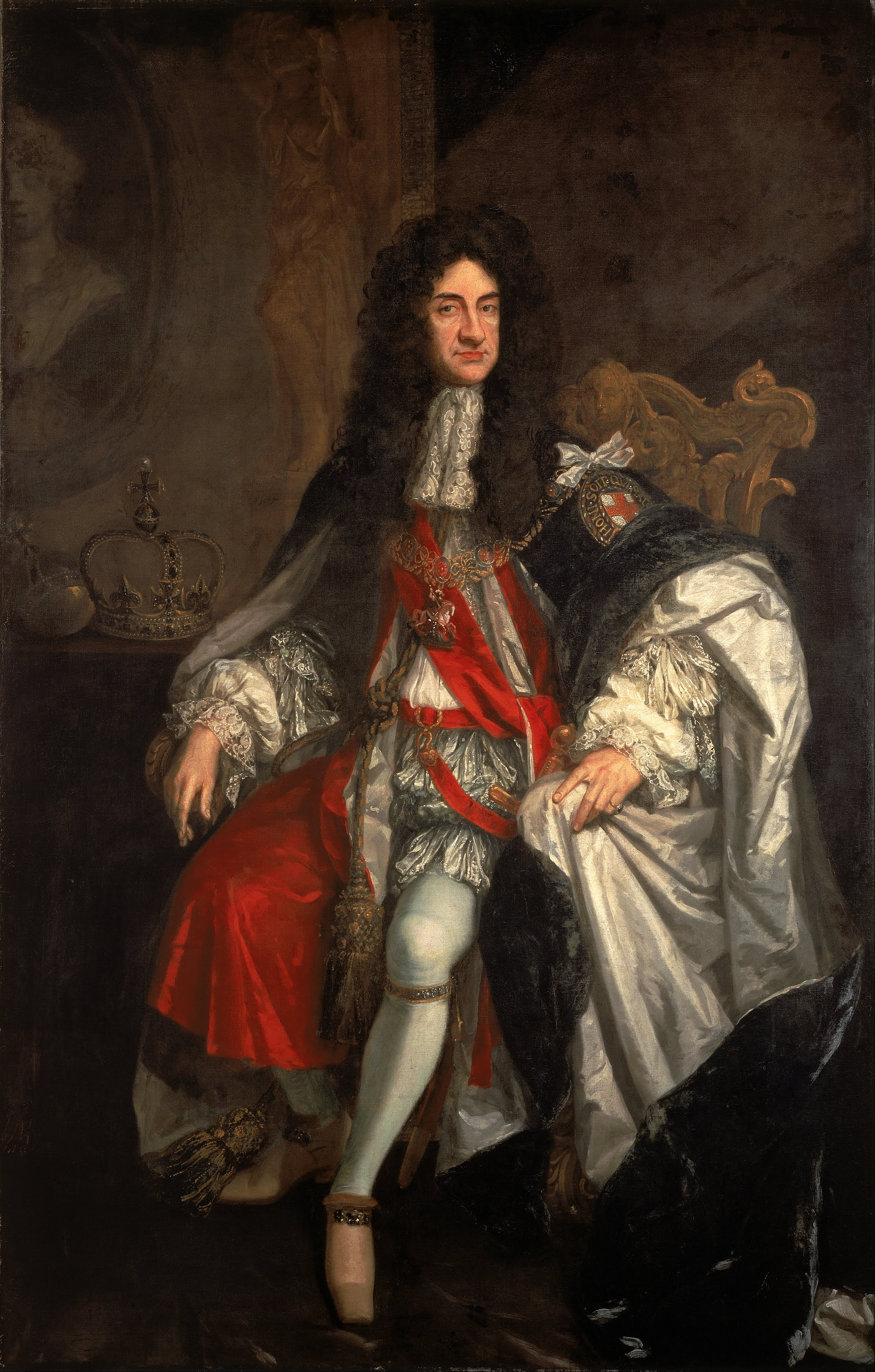
Charles II, 1685

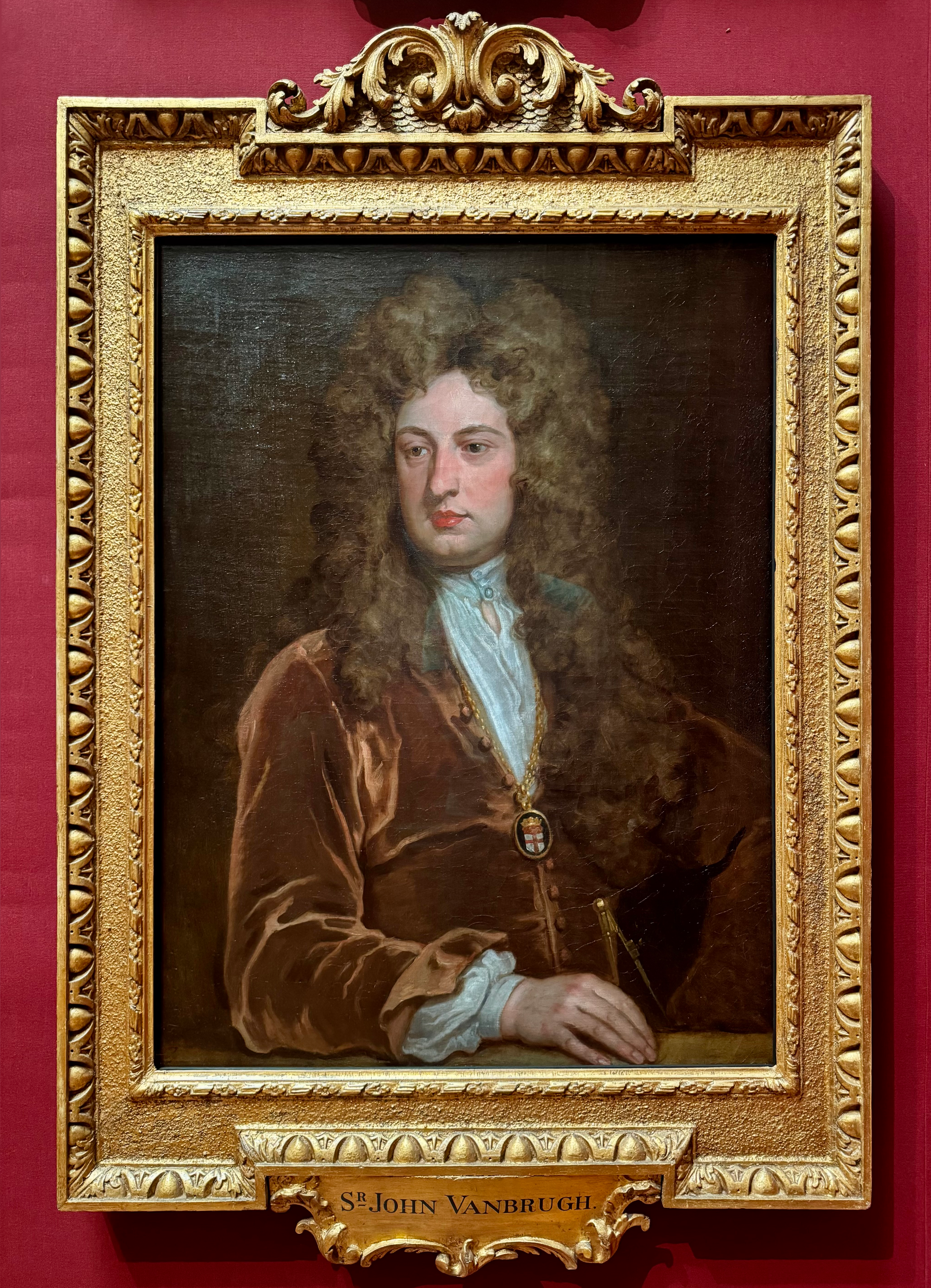
Sir John Vanbrugh in Kneller's Kit-cat portrait, considered one of Kneller's finest portraits.

Kneller was born Gottfried Kniller in the Free City of Lübeck, the son of Zacharias Kniller, a portrait painter. Kneller initially studied mathematics at the University of Leiden, however, owing to his inclination for drawing, became a pupil of Ferdinand Bol and Rembrandt Harmenszoon van Rijn in Amsterdam by choice of his father. His earliest dated work, no doubt a technical product of this period, is of Johann Philipp von Schönborn, completed in 1666 and now hanging at the Kunsthistorisches Museum in Vienna.

He then travelled with his brother John Zacharias Kneller, who was an ornamental painter, to Rome and Venice in the early 1670s, painting historical subjects and portraits in the studio of Carlo Maratti, and later moved to Hamburg.

== Career ==
The brothers came to England in 1676, and won the patronage of the Duke of Monmouth. He was introduced to, and painted a portrait of, Charles II.

In England, Kneller concentrated almost entirely on portraiture. In the spirit of enterprise, he founded a studio which churned out portraits on an almost industrial scale, relying on a brief sketch of the face with details added to a formulaic model, aided by the fashion for gentlemen to wear full wigs. Under this system, Kneller was capable of receiving up to fourteen sitters in a single day. His portraits set a pattern that was followed until William Hogarth and Joshua Reynolds.

He eventually established himself as a leading portraitist in England. When Sir Peter Lely died in 1680, Kneller was jointly appointed Principal Painter in Ordinary with John Riley to the Crown by Charles II.

For about 20 years (c. 1682–1702) he lived at No. 1617 The Great Piazza, Covent Garden. Kneller's studio manager was Edward Byng.

Between early 1690 and late 1691, Kneller painted the Hampton Court Beauties depicting the most glamorous ladies-in-waiting of the Royal Court by commission from Queen Mary II. In 1692, Kneller received his knighthood from William III, consequent to the success of the works. Kneller's Beauties emulated the Windsor Beauties by Sir Peter Lely, which were painted for Anne Hyde, duchess of York, Queen Mary II's mother.

Adding to his honours, on 9 November 1695, in the presence of the King, Kneller was created Doctor of Civil Law, an honorary degree awarded by the University of Oxford now confined to the recognition of 'excellence in legal scholarship'. In 1700, he was also created a Knight of the Holy Roman Empire by Emperor Leopold I.

He produced a series of "Kit-cat" portraits - recognisable from their unique 28" x 36" dimension - of 48 leading politicians and men of letters who were members of the Kit-Cat Club.

Created a baronet by King George I on 24 May 1715, he was also head of the Kneller Academy of Painting and Drawing from 1711 until 1716 in Great Queen Street, London, which counted such artists as Thomas Gibson amongst its founding directors. His paintings were praised by Whig members including John Dryden, Joseph Addison, Richard Steele, and Alexander Pope.

On the landing in Horsham Museum in West Sussex hang works of art from the museum's extensive painting collection, featuring a large 18th-century portrait of Charles Eversfield and his wife, of Denne Park House.

== Legal Career ==
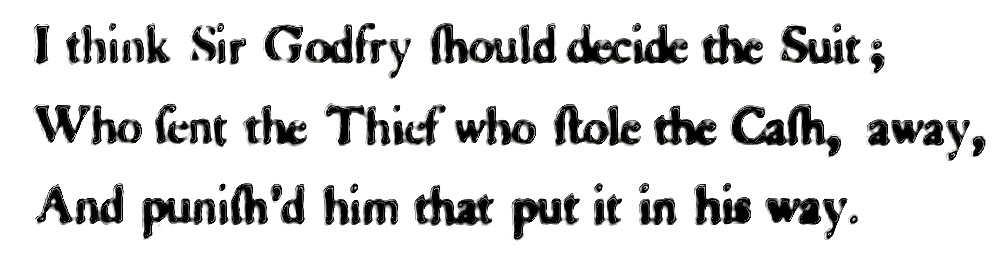
Passage from Alexander Pope's satire of The Second Epistle of the Second Book of Horace.

In addition to Kneller's work as a painter, in the early 1700s he also served as a Justice of the Peace - or as it is more commonly termed today, a magistrate - for the county of Middlesex. He is said to have had a 'shrewd wit and sound judgment' and that he 'exercised a rough-and-ready sort of equity which commanded respect'. During his tenure as a JP, he presided over a well-known entrapment case immortalised by Alexander Pope in his satire on The Second Epistle of the Second Book of Horace, which was published in 1737.

There is a very good story told of Sir Godfrey Kneller, in his character of a Justice of the peace. A gentleman brought his servant before him, upon an accusation of having stolen some money from him; but it having come out that he had laid it purposely in the servant's way, in order to try his honesty, Sir Godfrey sent the master to prison.

— James Boswell, The Life of Samuel Johnson

== Personal life ==
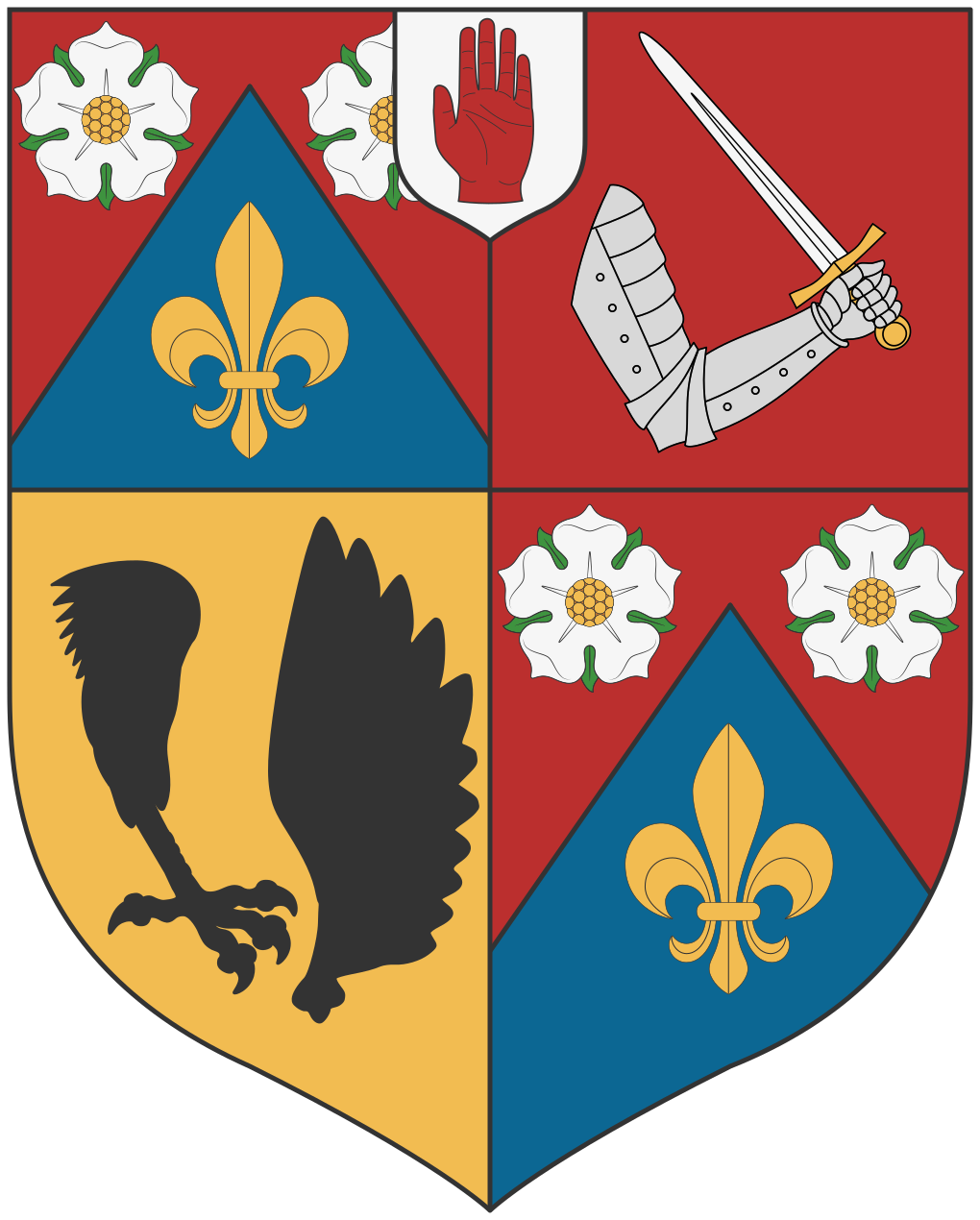
The coat of arms of Kneller of Whitton, Baronets

He married a widow, Susanna Grave, on 23 January 1704 at St Bride's Church, London. She was the daughter of the Reverend John Cawley, Archdeacon of Lincoln and Rector of Henley-on-Thames, and the granddaughter of regicide William Cawley. The couple had no children.

== Death ==
Kneller died the night of 19 October 1723 at Great Queen Street having suffered a year and five months from fever. Following a grand funeral, his remains were ultimately interred at St Mary's Church,Twickenham. He had been a churchwarden at St Mary's when the 14th-century nave collapsed in 1713 and was active in the plans for the church's reconstruction by John James. His widow was buried at Twickenham on 11 December 1729.

Alexander Pope, some years after Kneller's death in 1731, wrote in a touching letter that 'Sir Godfrey Kneller call'd imploying the pencil [paint-brush], the prayer of the painter, and affirm'd it to be his proper way of serving God, by the talent he gave him'.

== Legacy ==
Kneller's Name Act 1730
- Act of Parliament
- Parliament of Great Britain
- Long title: An Act for enabling Godfrey Kneller Huckle Gentleman, and the Heirs of his Body, to take and use the Surname of Kneller.
- Citation: 4 Geo. 2. c. 32 Pr.
- Territorial extent: Great Britain

Dates
- Royal assent: 7 May 1731
- Commencement: 21 January 1731 (Note: Start of session.)

Status: Current legislation

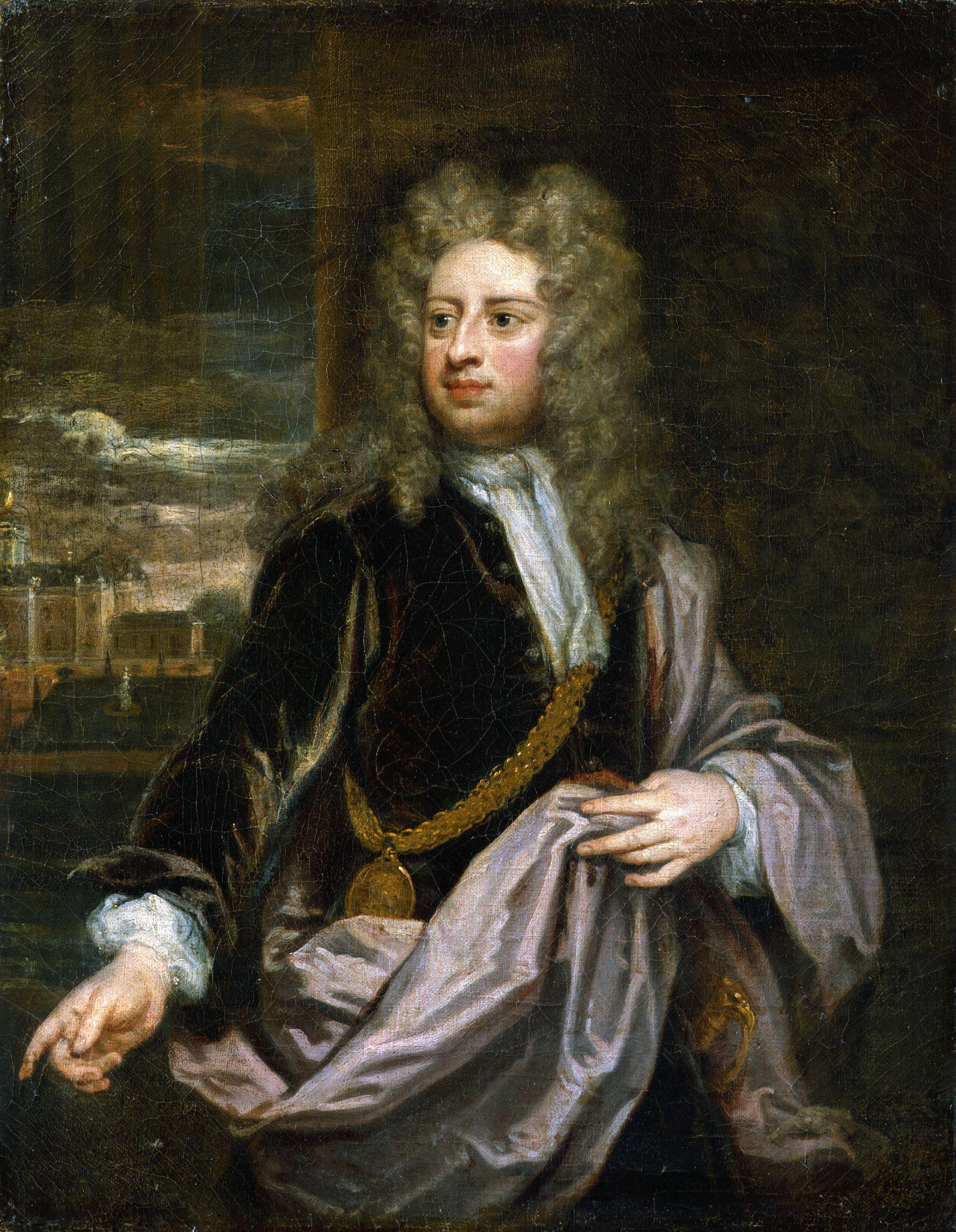
Self-portrait celebrating 'Kneller's worldly success'

A memorial was erected in Westminster Abbey. Kneller's will gave a pension of £100 a year to his assistant Edward Byng and entrusted Byng with seeing that all unfinished work was completed. Byng also inherited the drawings in Kneller's studio.

Kneller and his wife had no children together. Most of his fortune was inherited by his grandson, Godfrey Kneller Huckle, who was the son of Agnes Huckle, Kneller's illegitimate daughter by Mrs Voss, and who took his grandfather's surname Kneller by private act of Parliament - Kneller's Name Act 1730 (4 Geo. 2. c. 32 Pr.) - as a condition of his inheritance.

The site of the house Kneller built in 1709 in Whitton, near Twickenham, became occupied by the mid-19th century Kneller Hall, home of the Royal Military School of Music until 31 August 2021. Kneller Hall was then purchased by Radnor House School (renamed in 2026 to Kneller Hall School) as the new senior school site.

== Works ==
In his hometown Lübeck there are works to be seen in the St. Annen Museum and in Saint Catherine Church. His former works at St. Mary's Church were destroyed by the Bombing of Lübeck 1942. A large oil portrait (84" x 55") of James VII of Scotland (King James II of England) hangs on the main staircase of private members' club, The Caledonian Club, in Belgravia, London.

A portrait of Queen Anne that belongs to Trinity Hospital in Retford, Nottinghamshire has been attributed to Kneller by the auctioneers Phillips – though it is unsigned. The hospital has a strong connection with Queen Anne, the founder being a first cousin of her grandmother. The portrait was restored and cleaned in 1999.

== Gallery ==
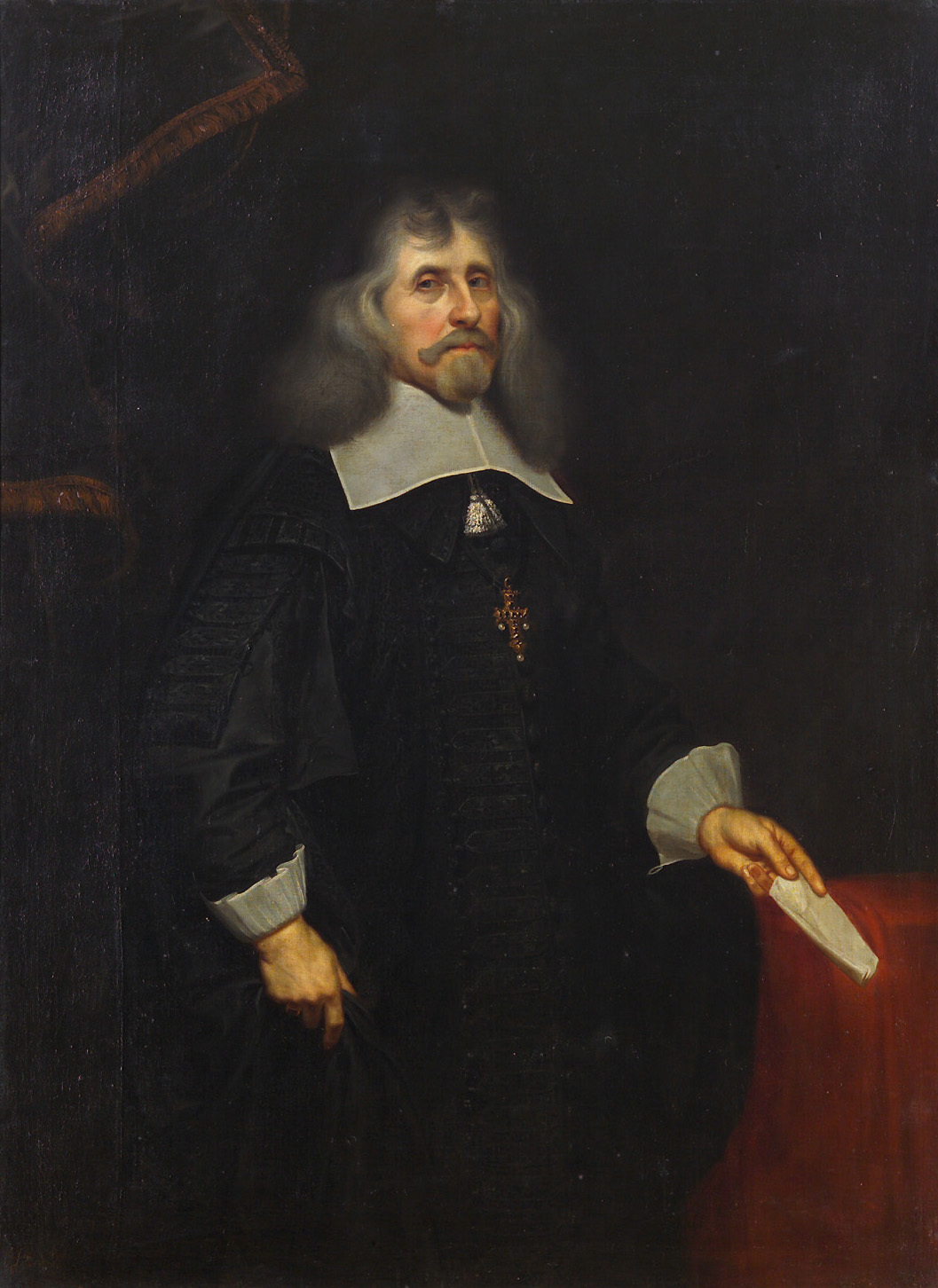
His earliest dated work, Johann Philipp Schönborn, 1666

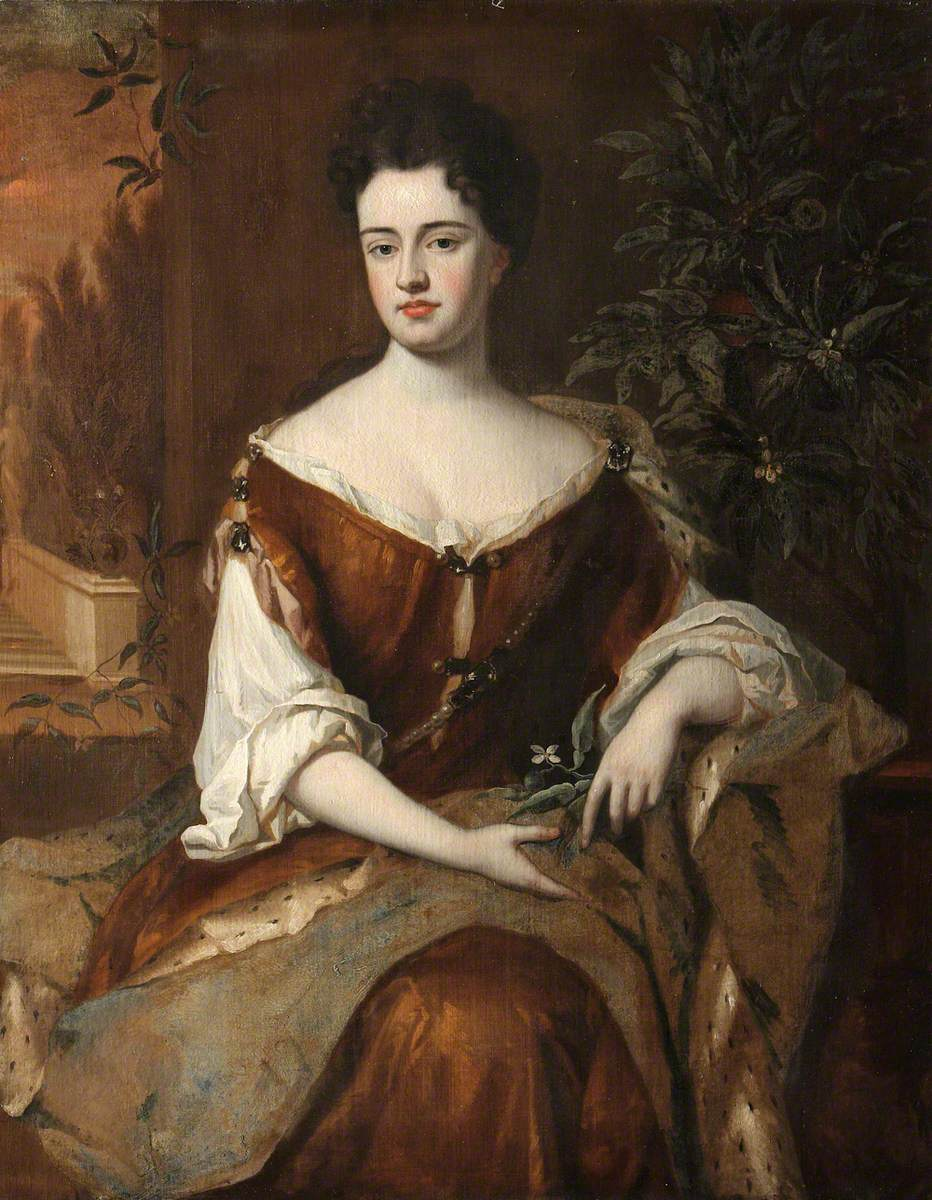
Princess Anne, 1683

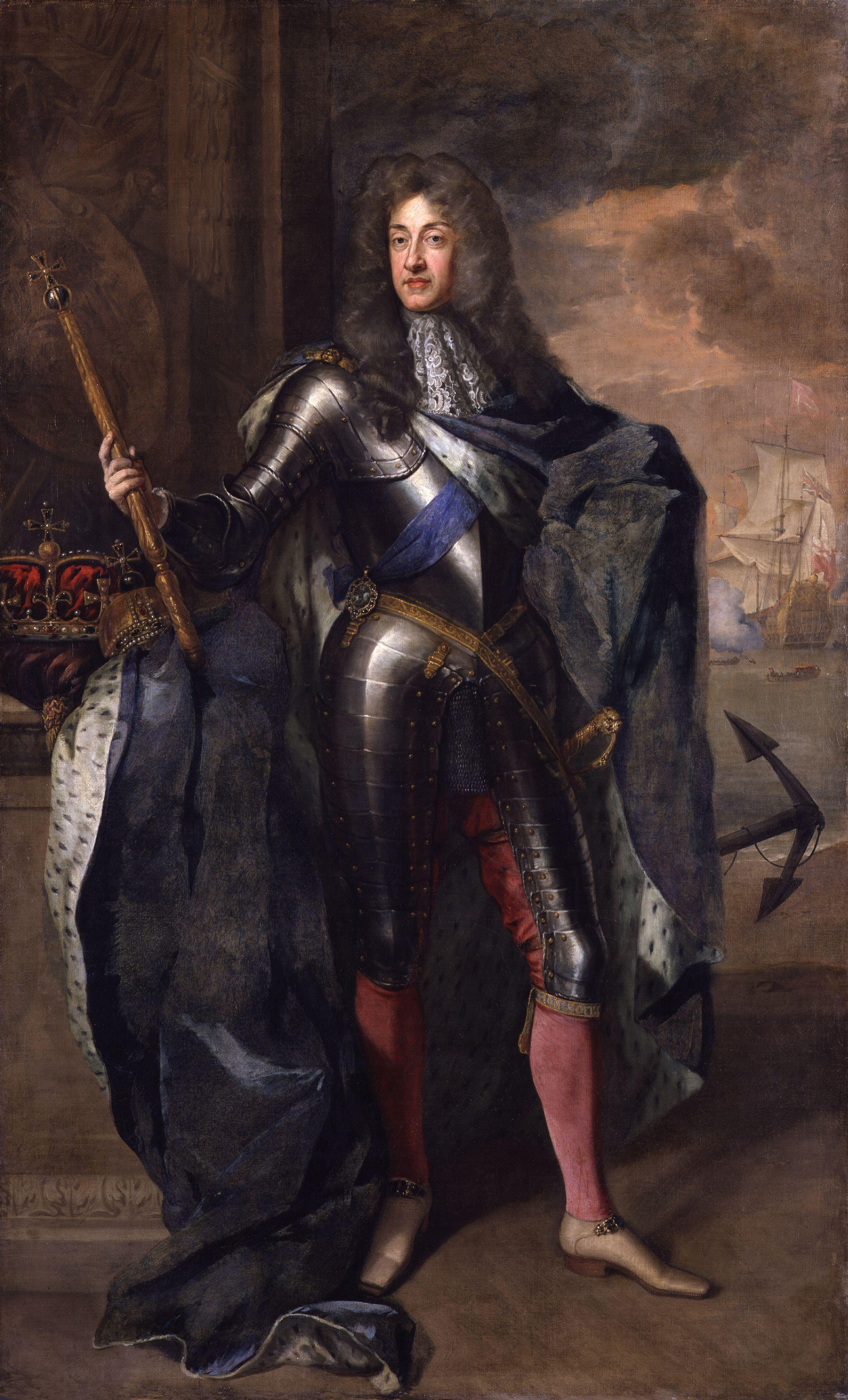
Portrait of James II of England, 1684

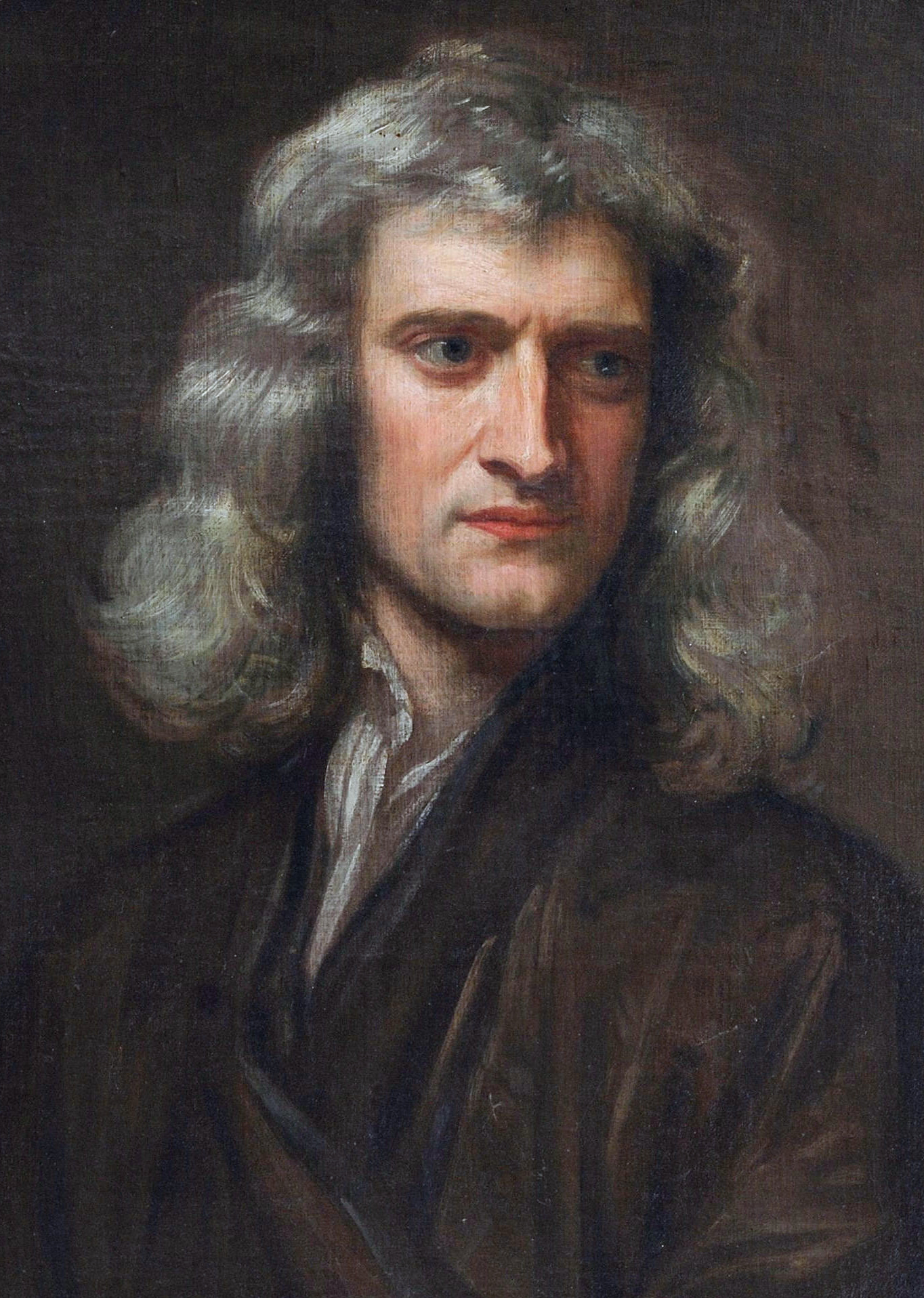
Portrait of Isaac Newton, 1689

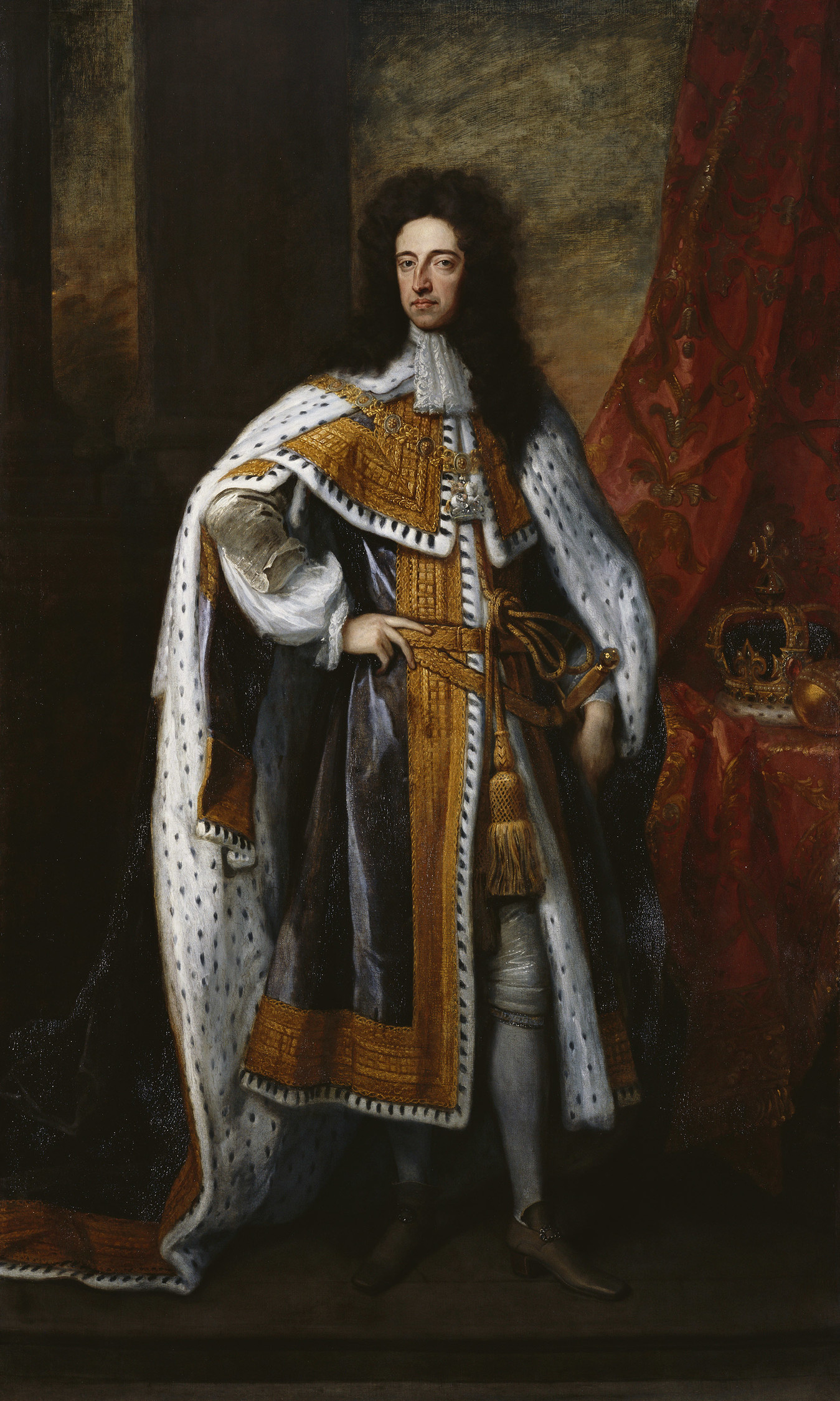
William III, 1690

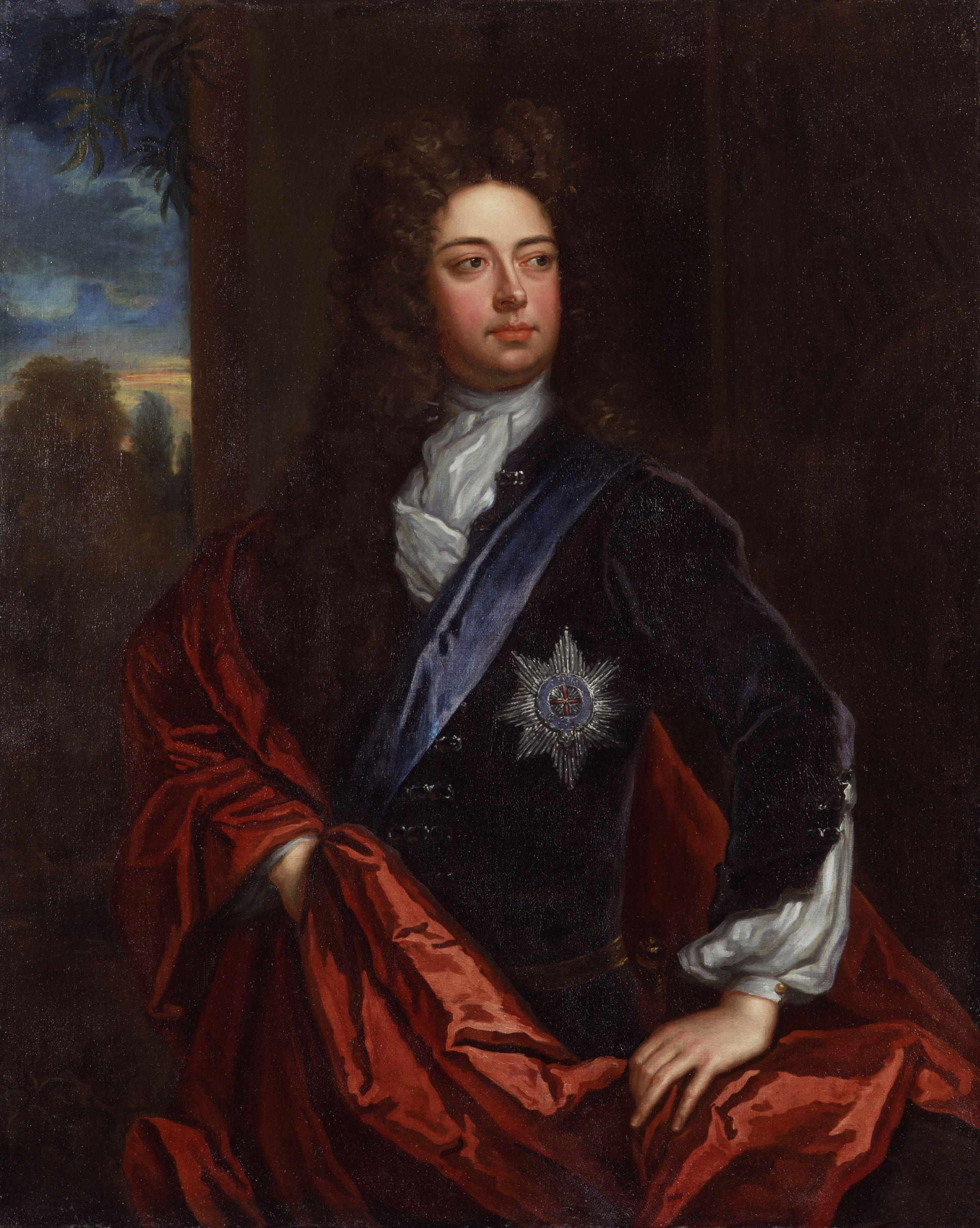
Earl of Marlborough, c. 1690

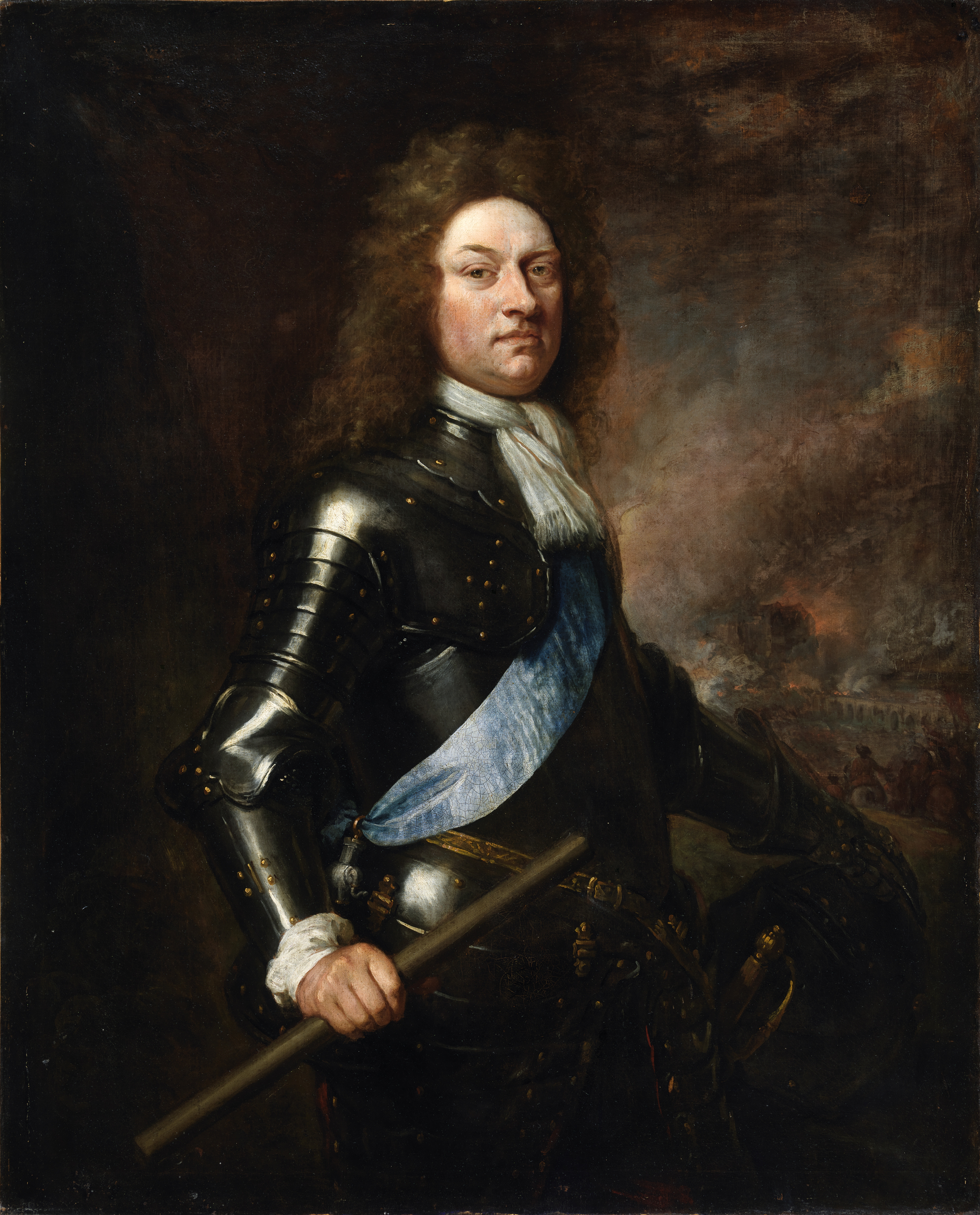
Portrait of Godert de Ginkel, 1st Earl of Athlone, c. 1692

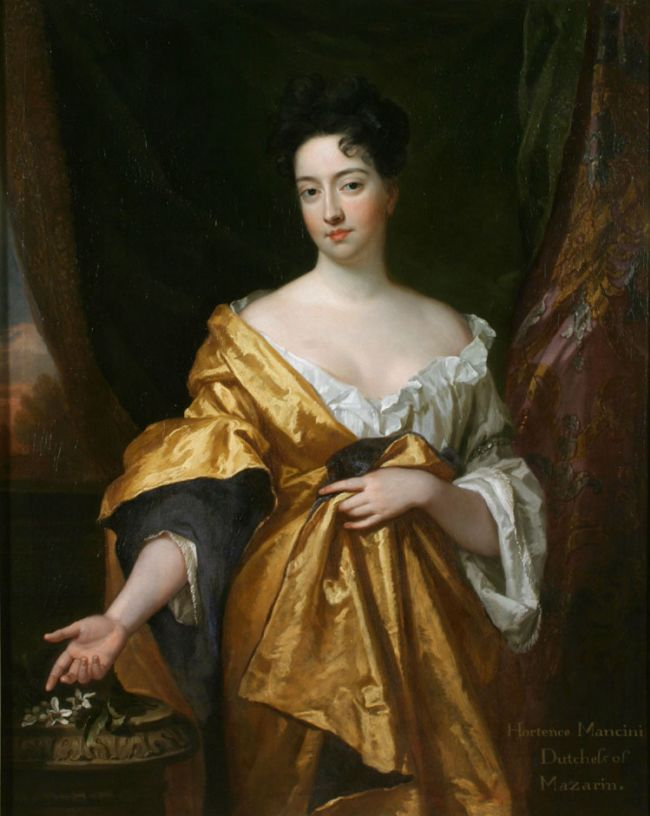
Portrait of Hortense Mancini, 1693

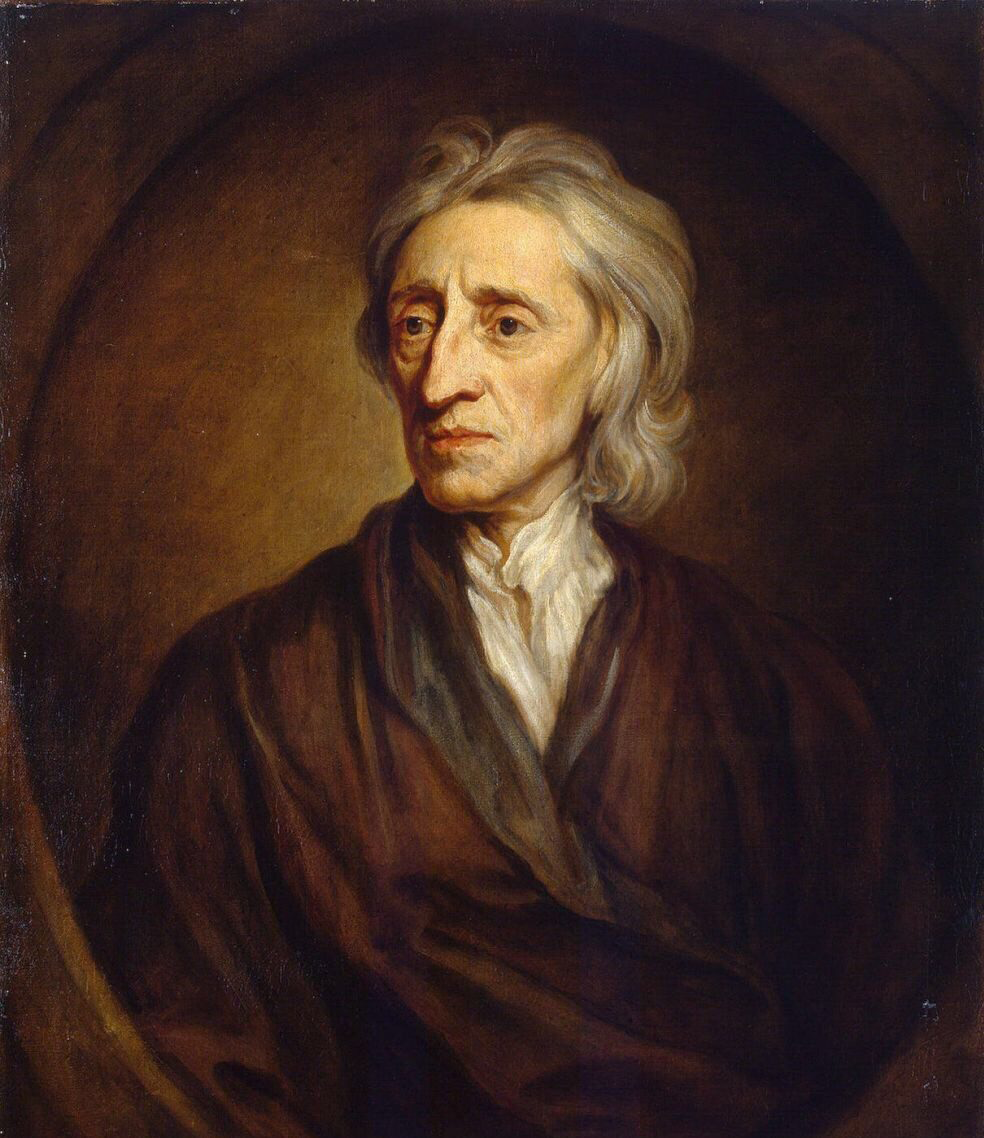
Portrait of John Locke, 1697

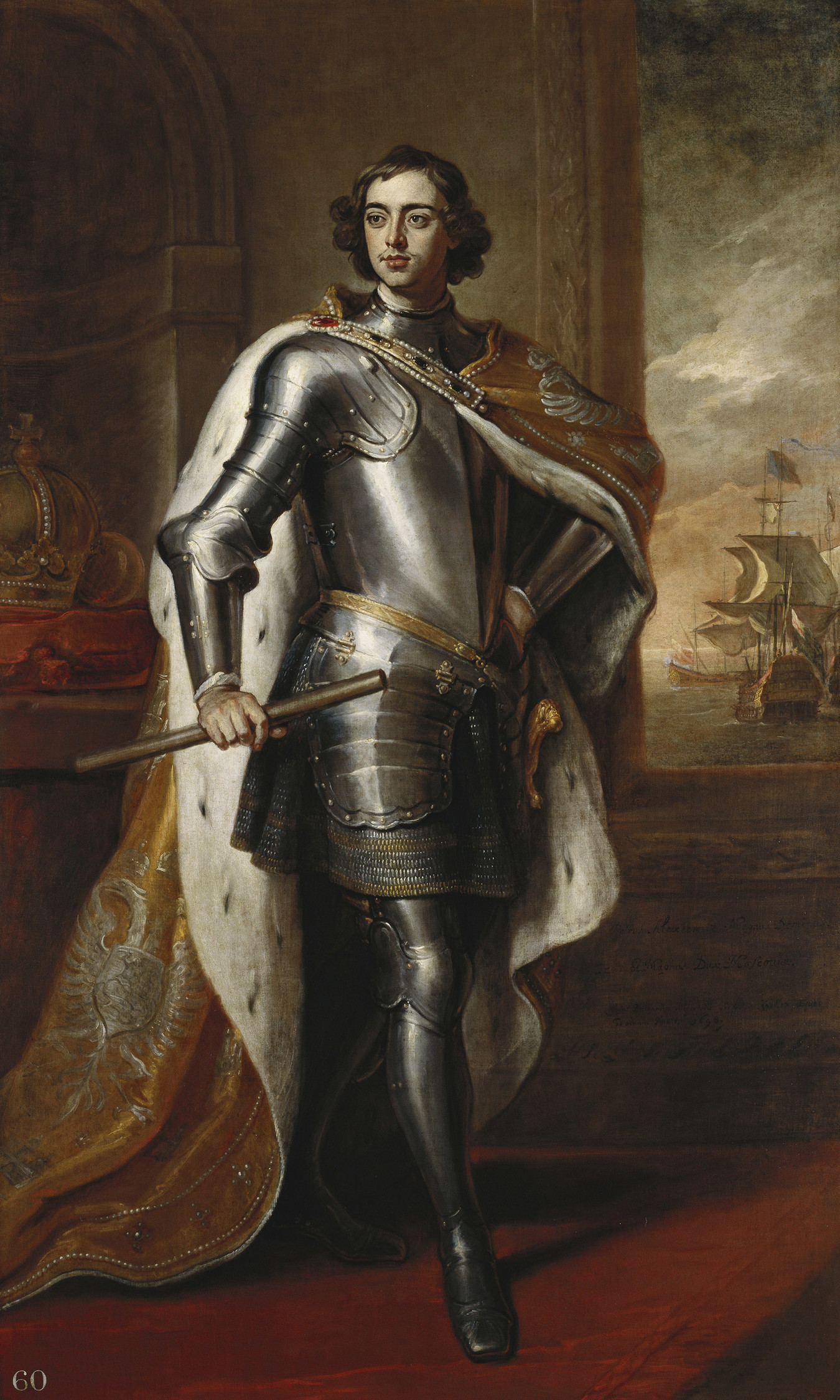
Peter the Great, 1698

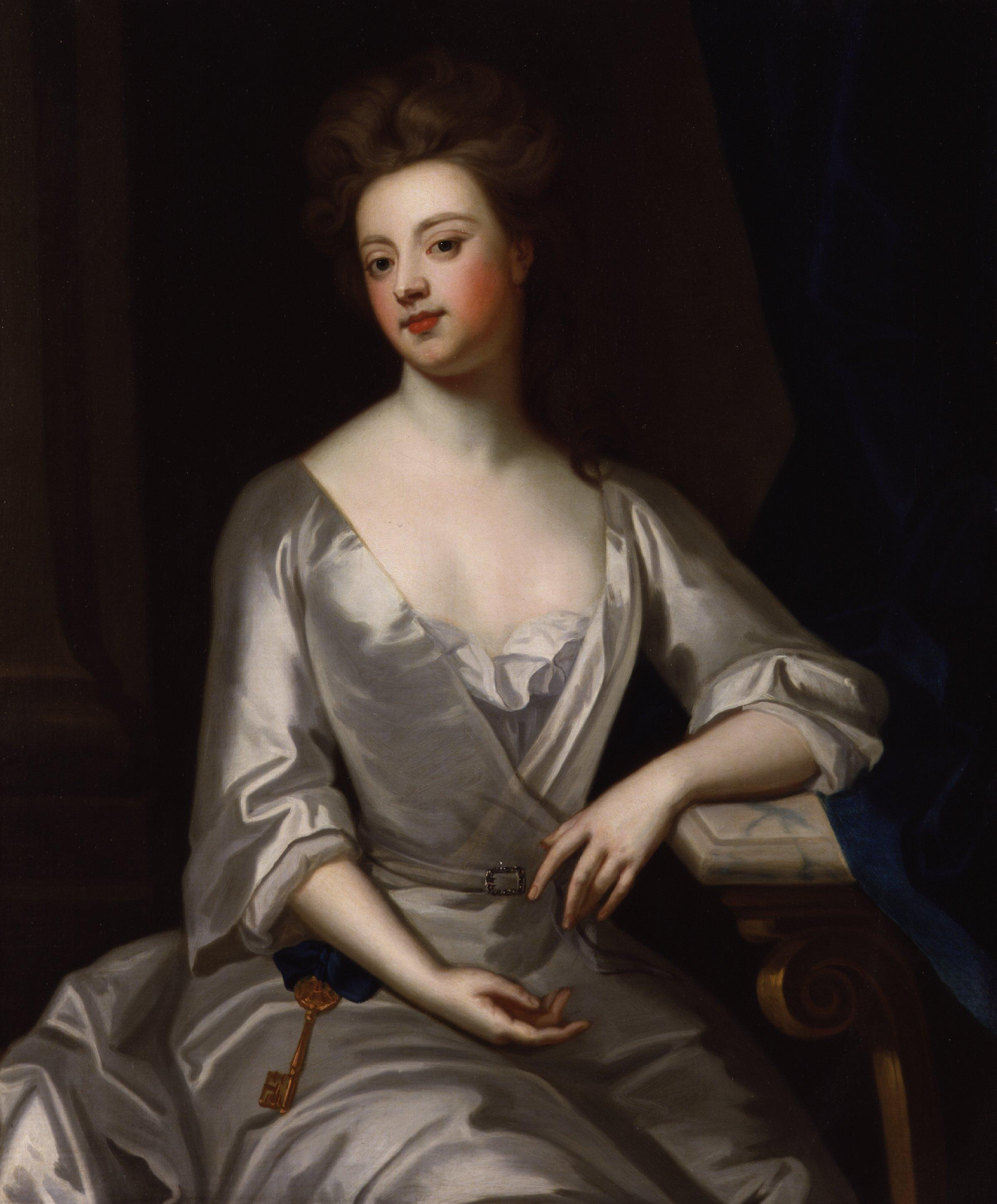
Sarah Churchill, Duchess of Marlborough, c. 1702

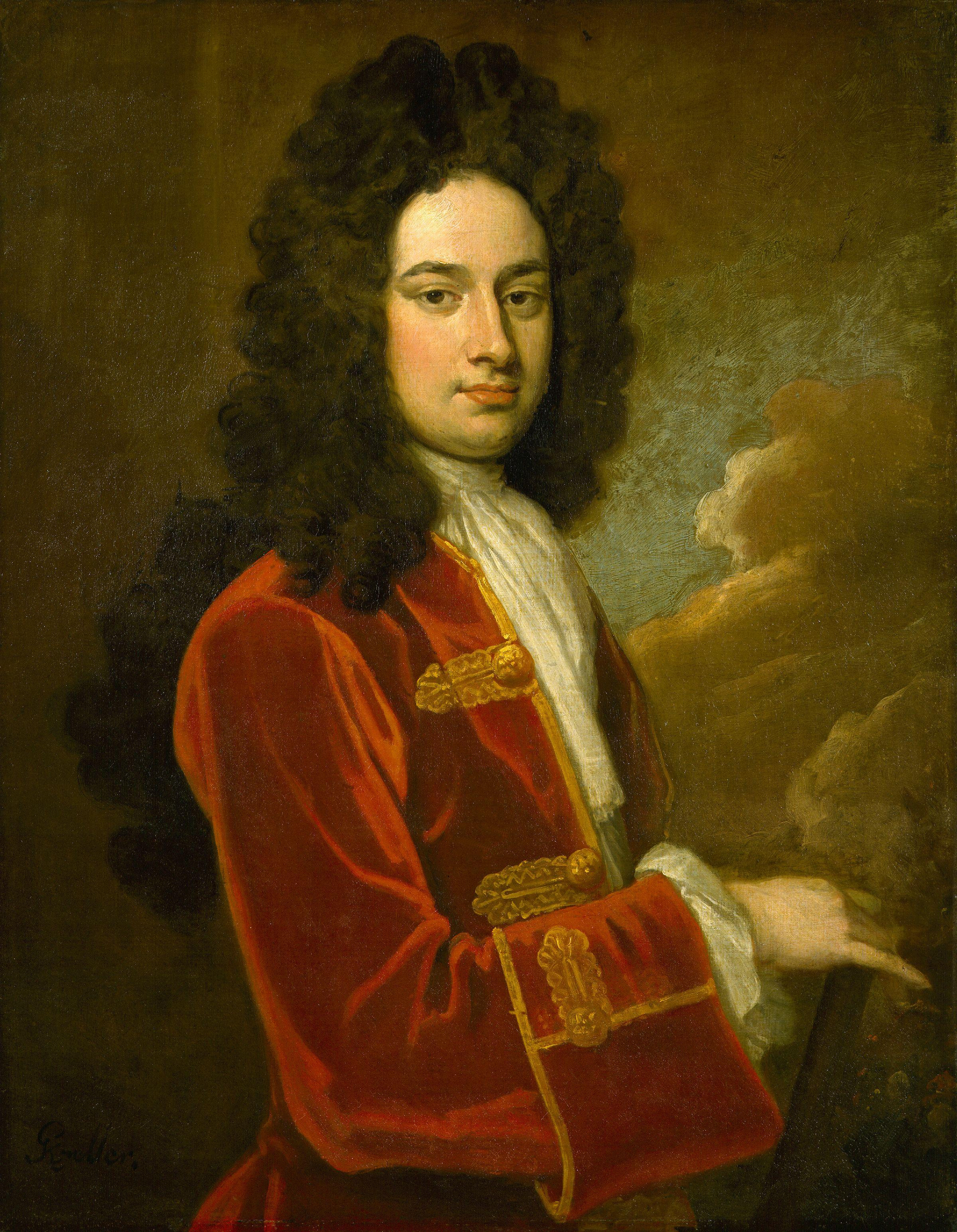
James Stanhope, c. 1710

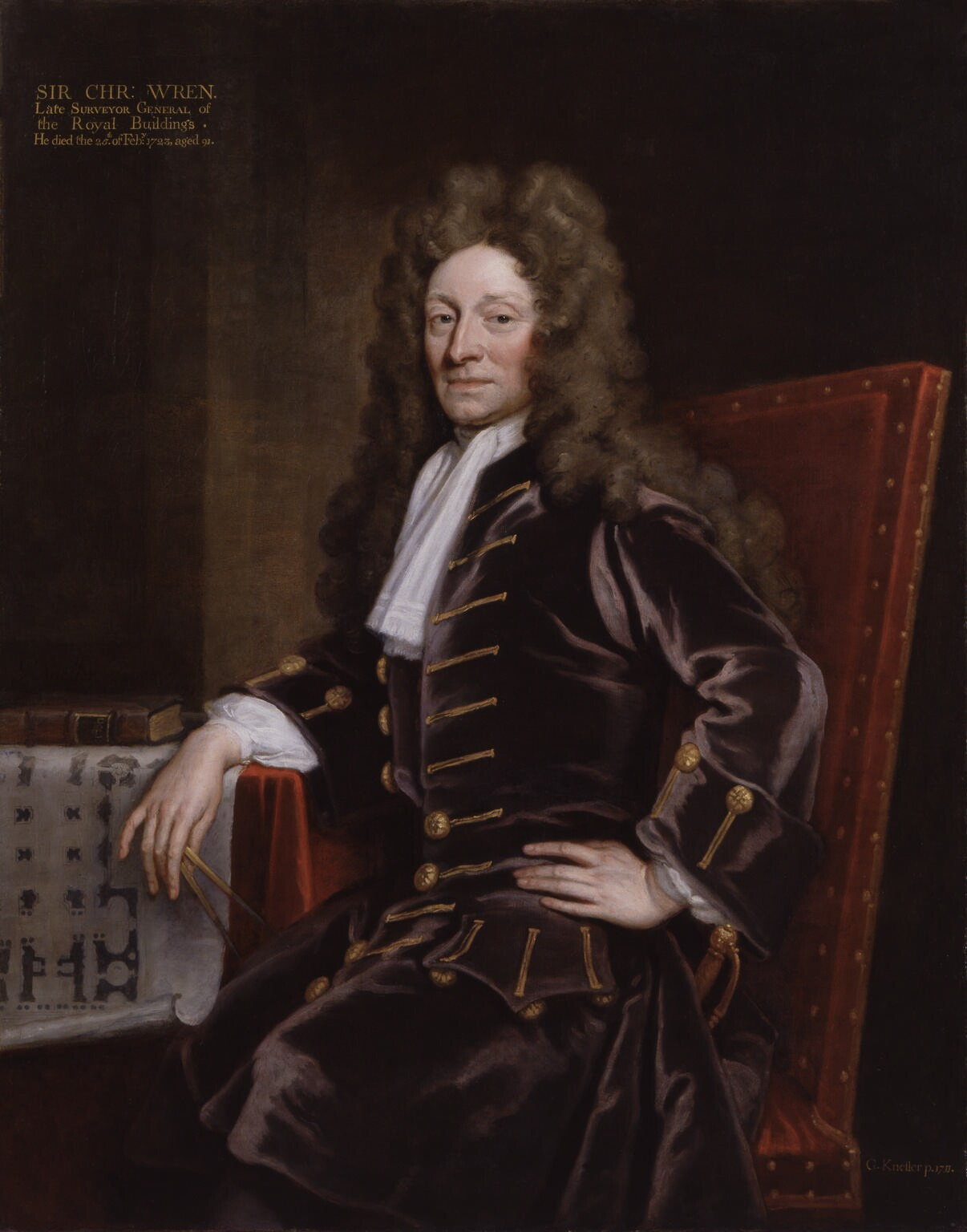
Portrait of Sir Christopher Wren, 1711

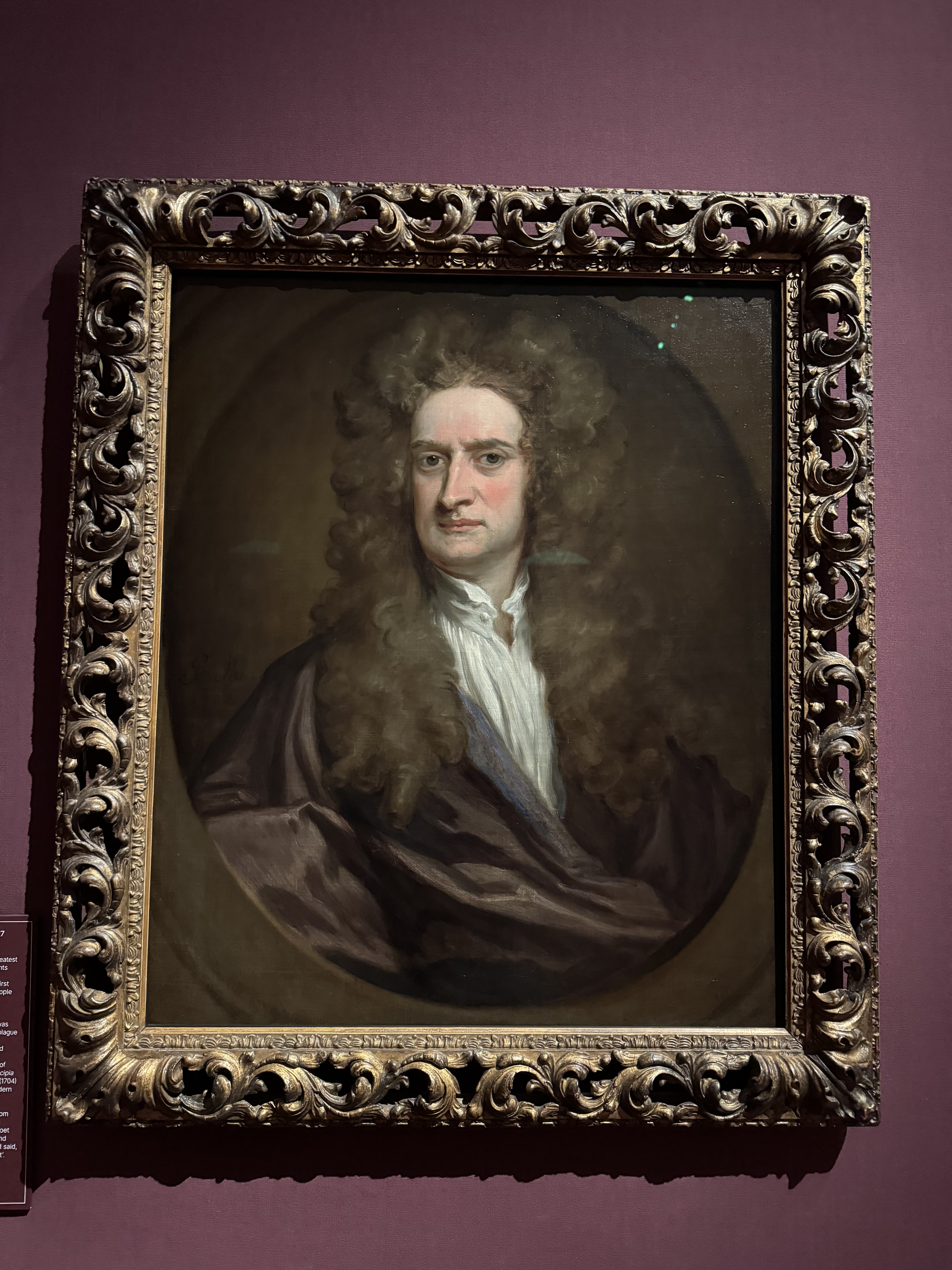
Sir Isaac Newton, 1702

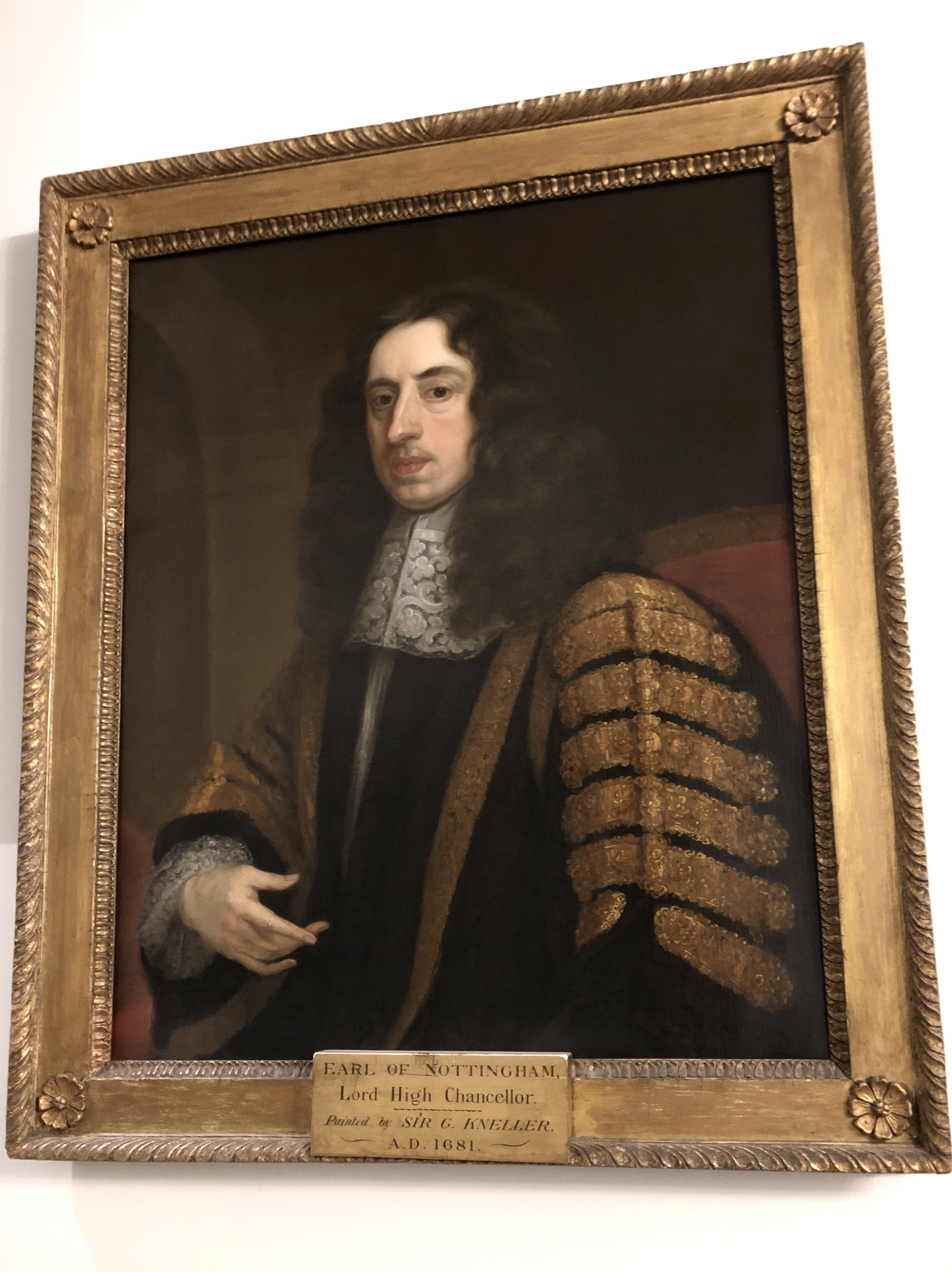
Earl of Nottingham,1681

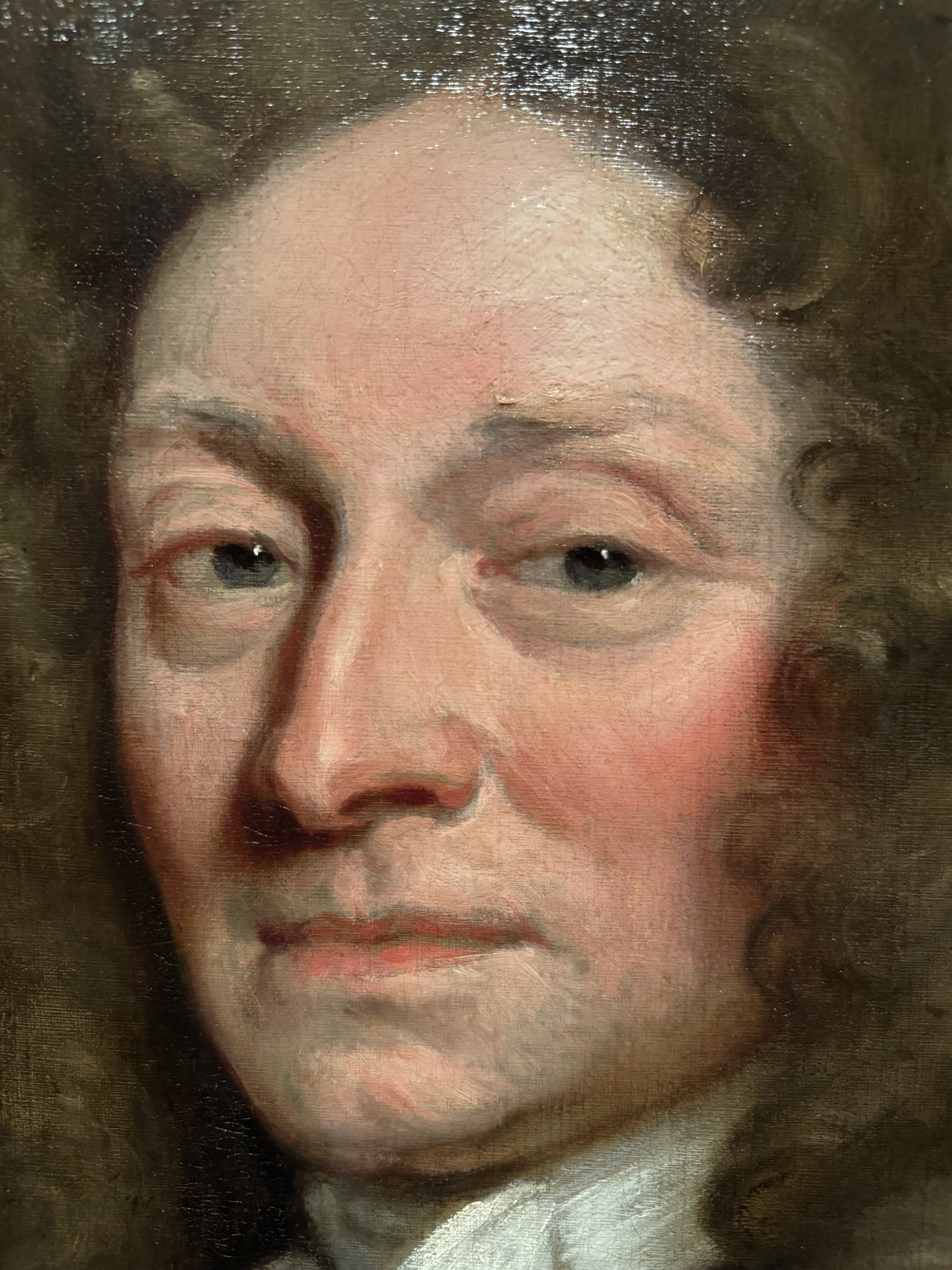
Close-up of Sir Christopher Wren, c. 1711

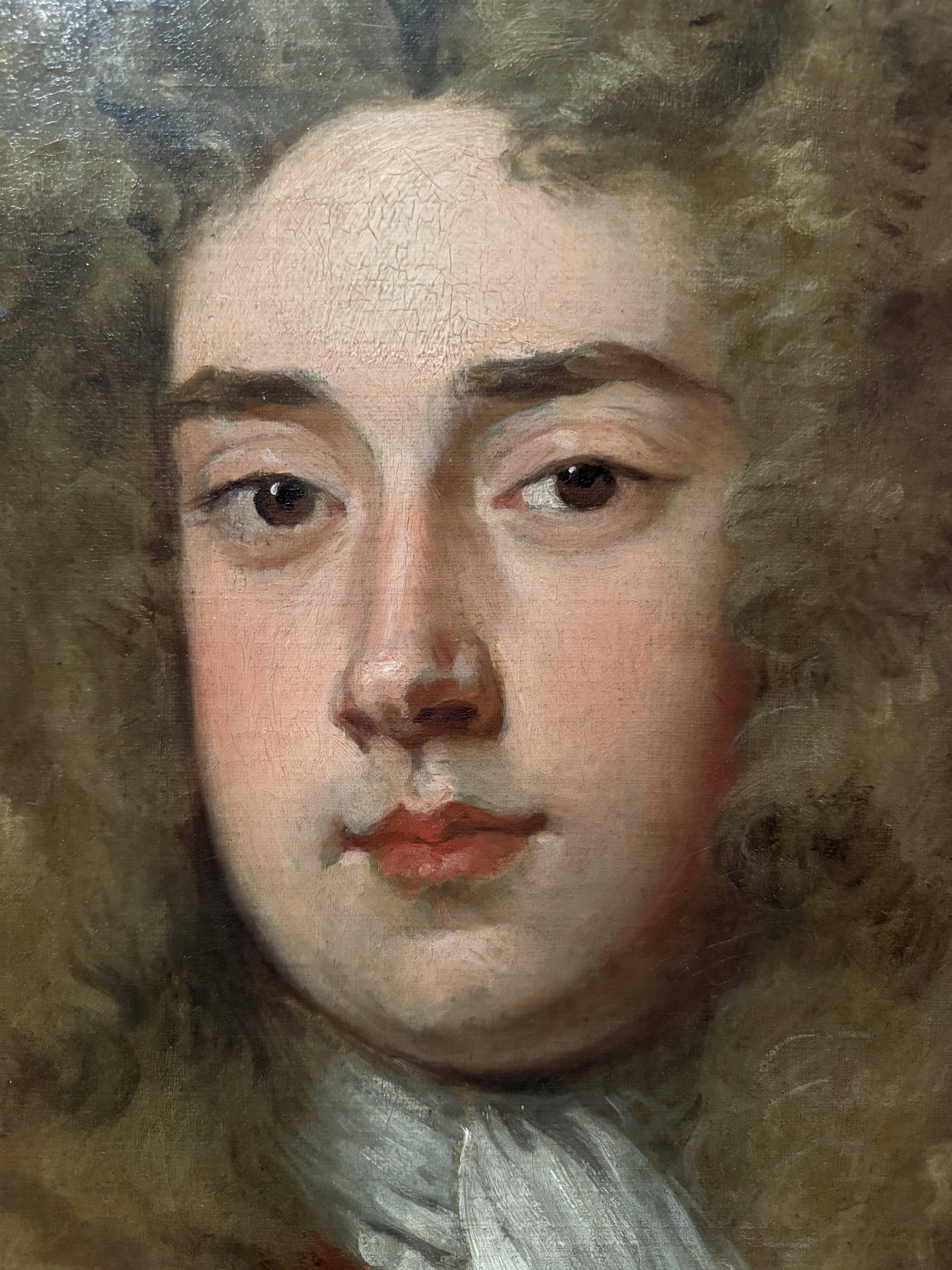
Richard Temple, c. 1713

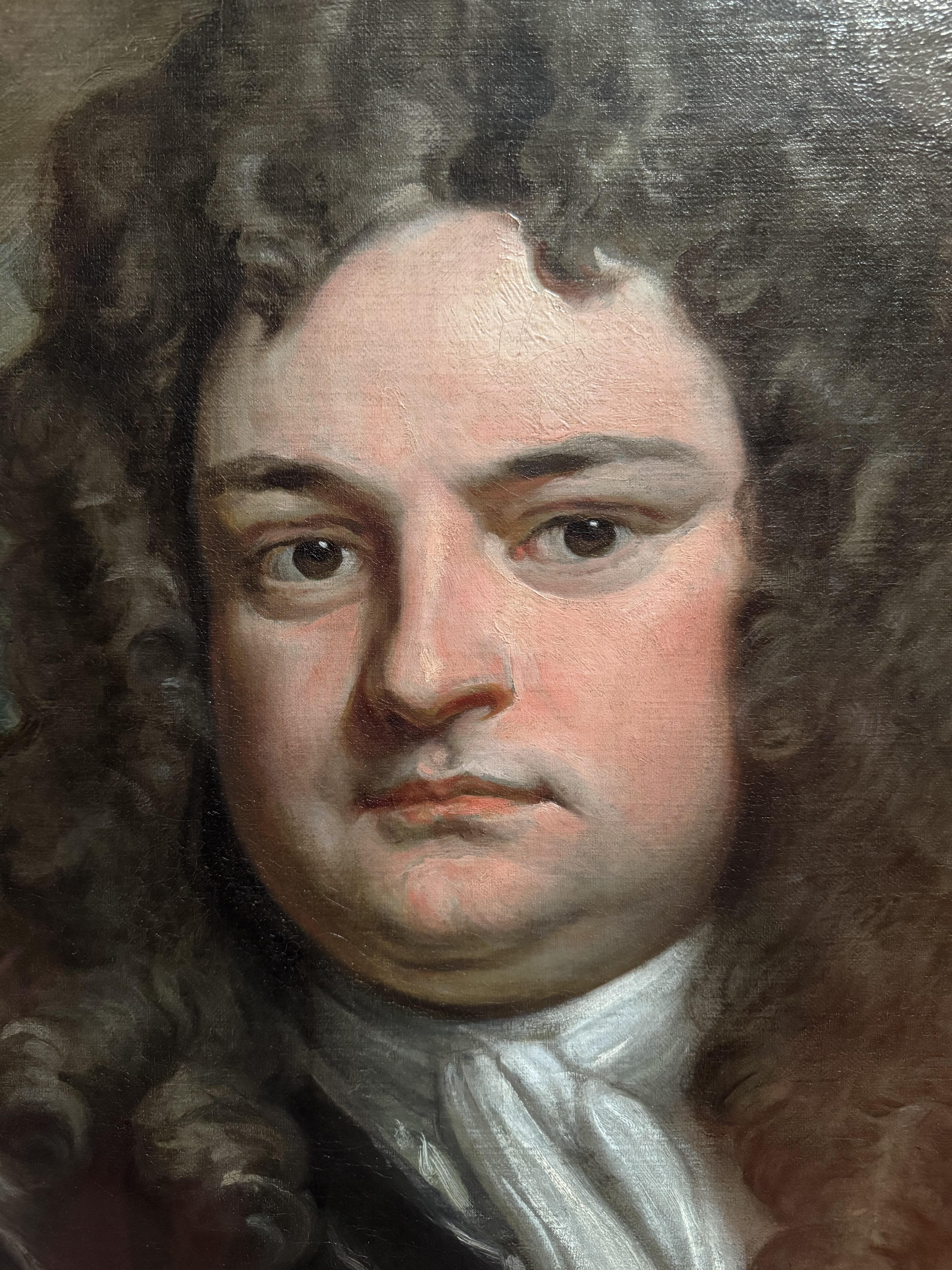
Close-up of Sir Richard Steele, 1711

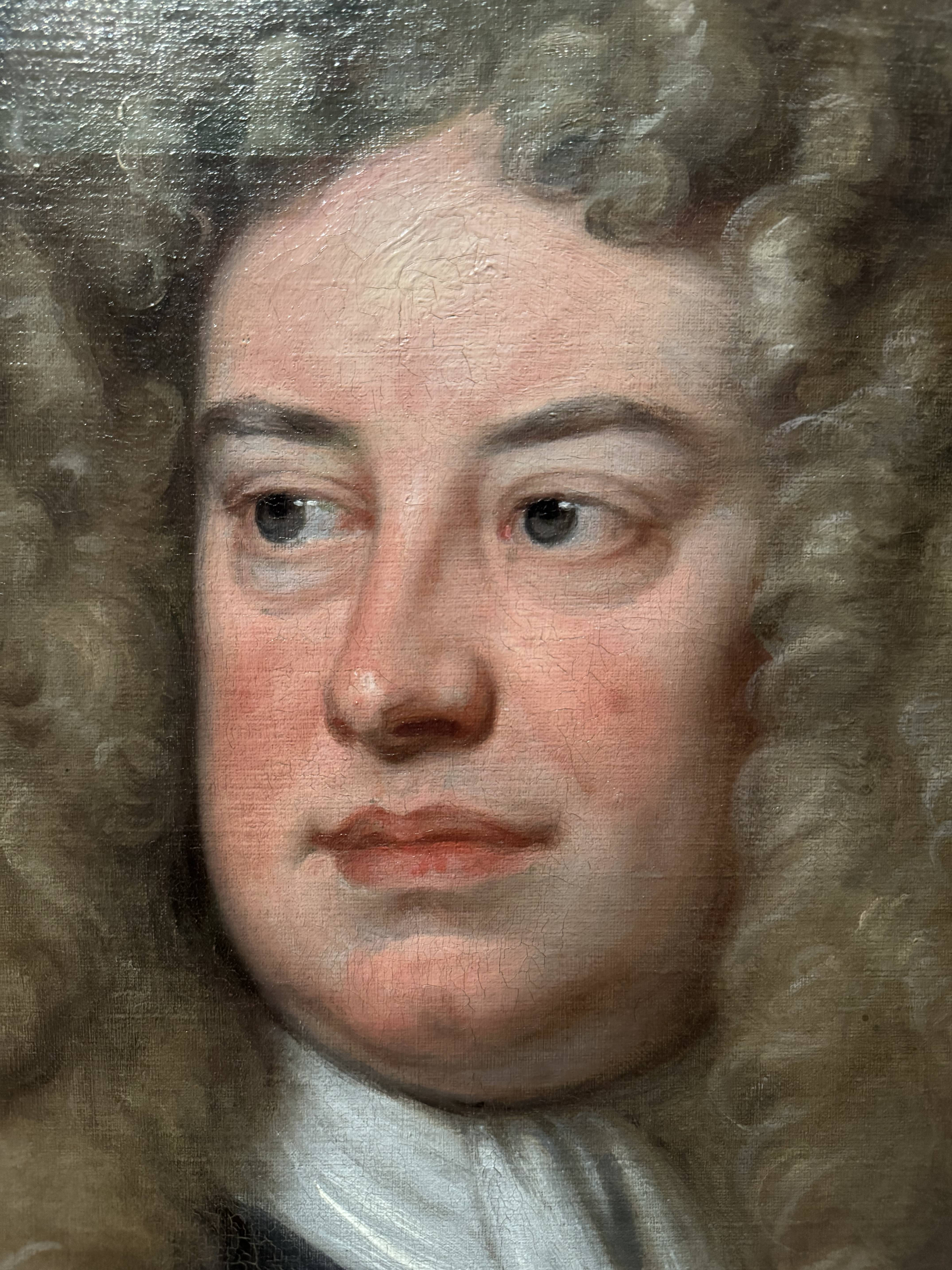
Close-up of John Somers, c. 1715-1716

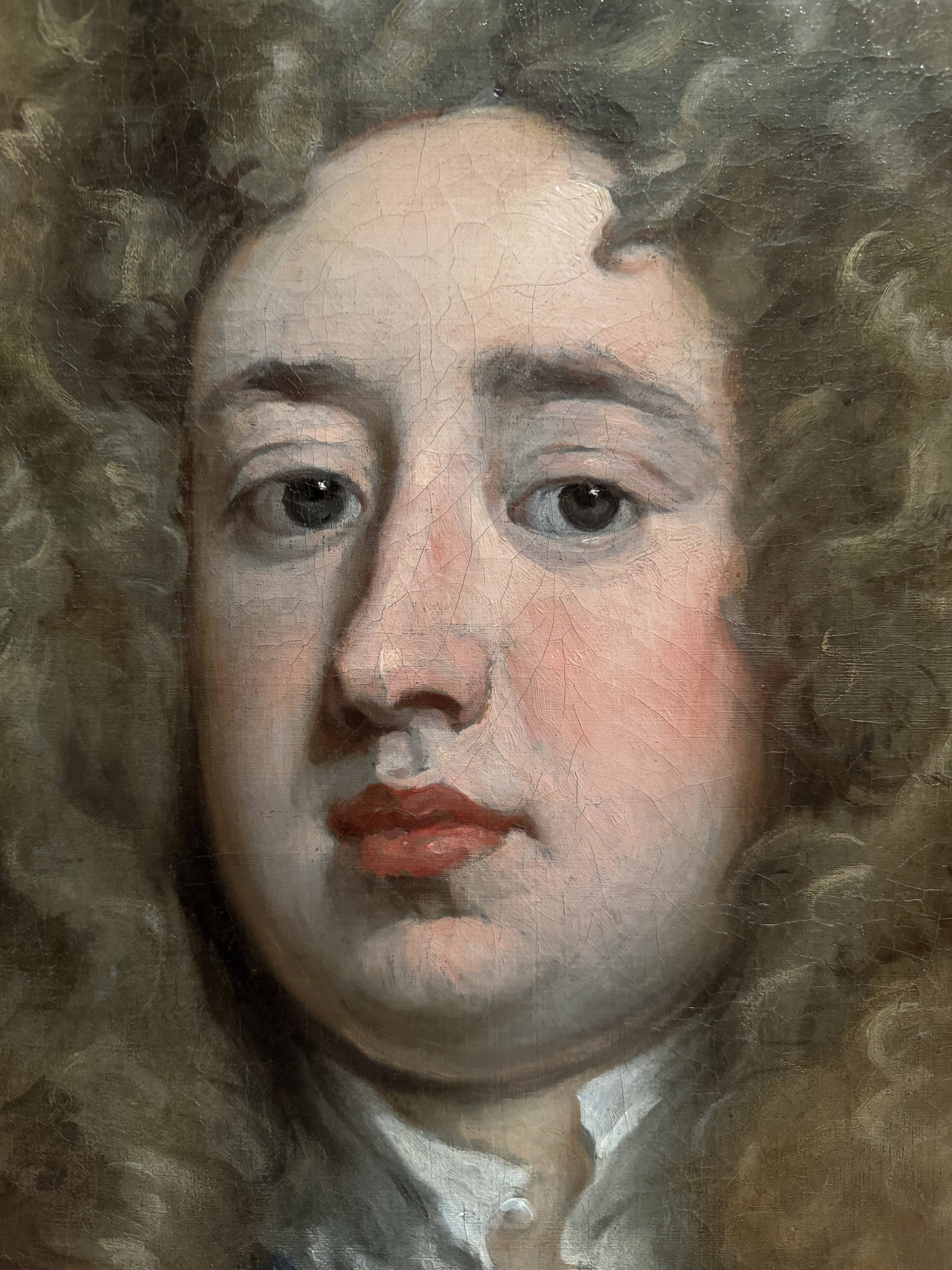
Close-up of Charles Mohun, 1707

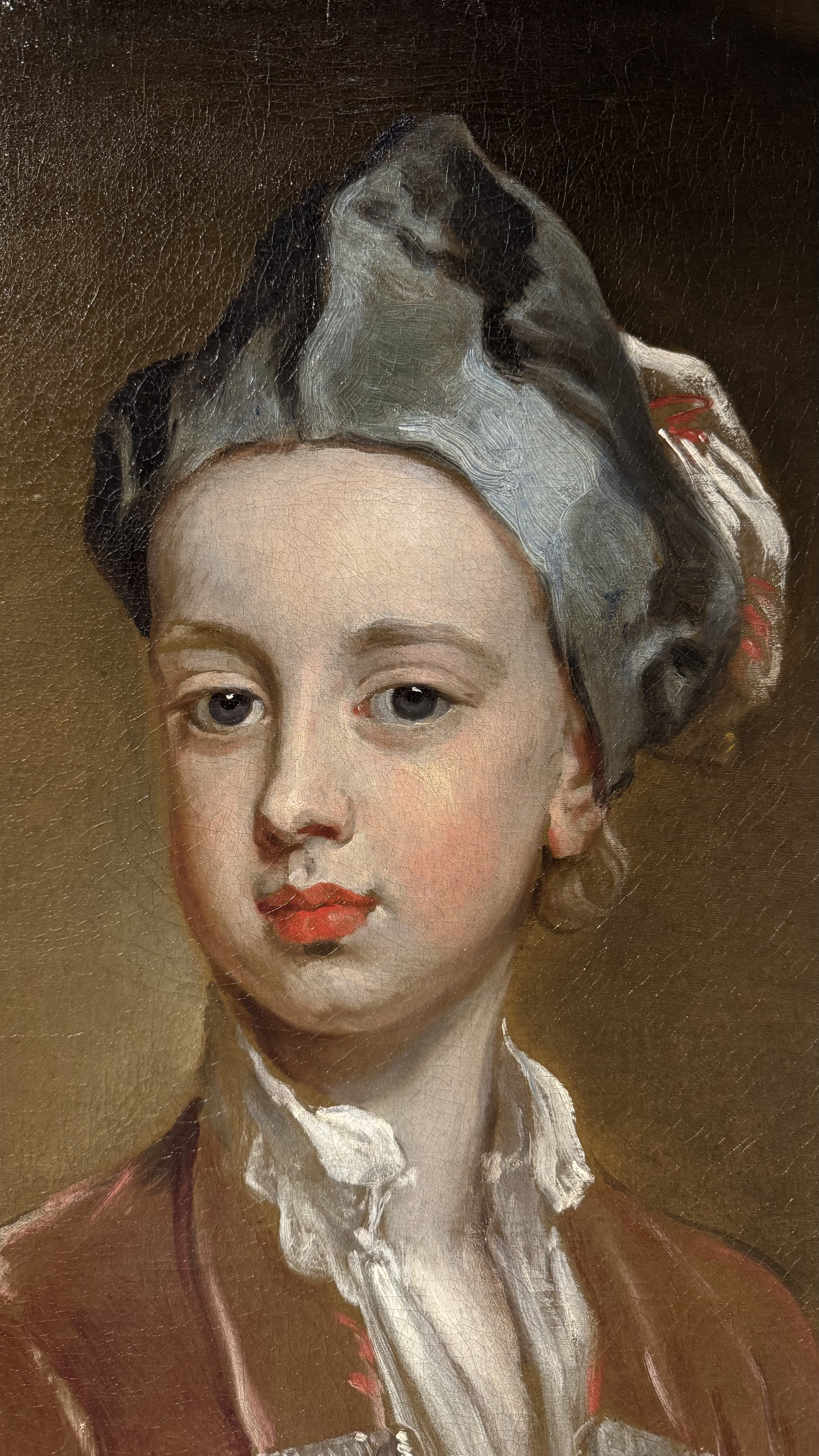
Close-up of Portrait of Edward Richard Montagu, Viscount Hinchingbrooke, 1700

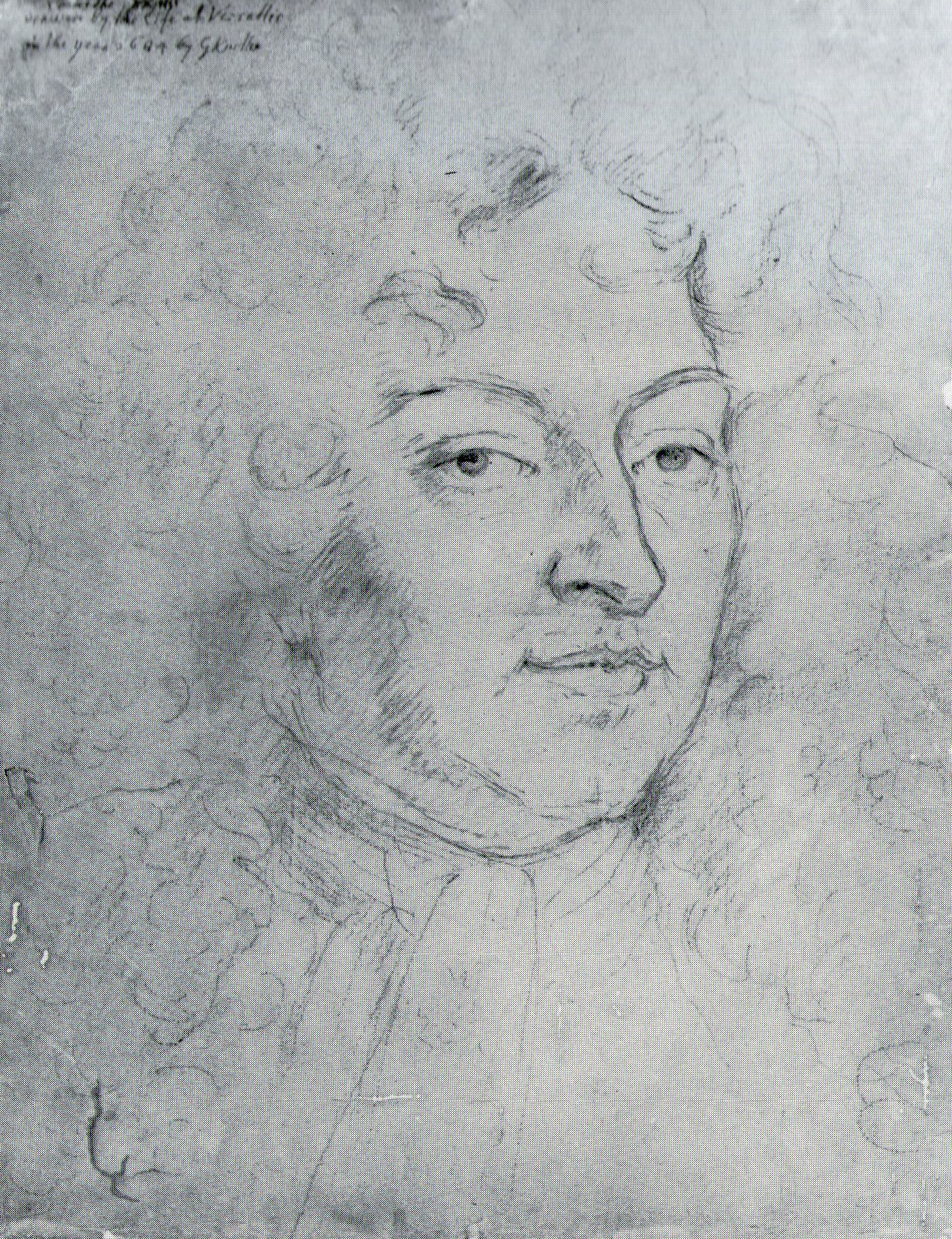
Louis XIV, 1684

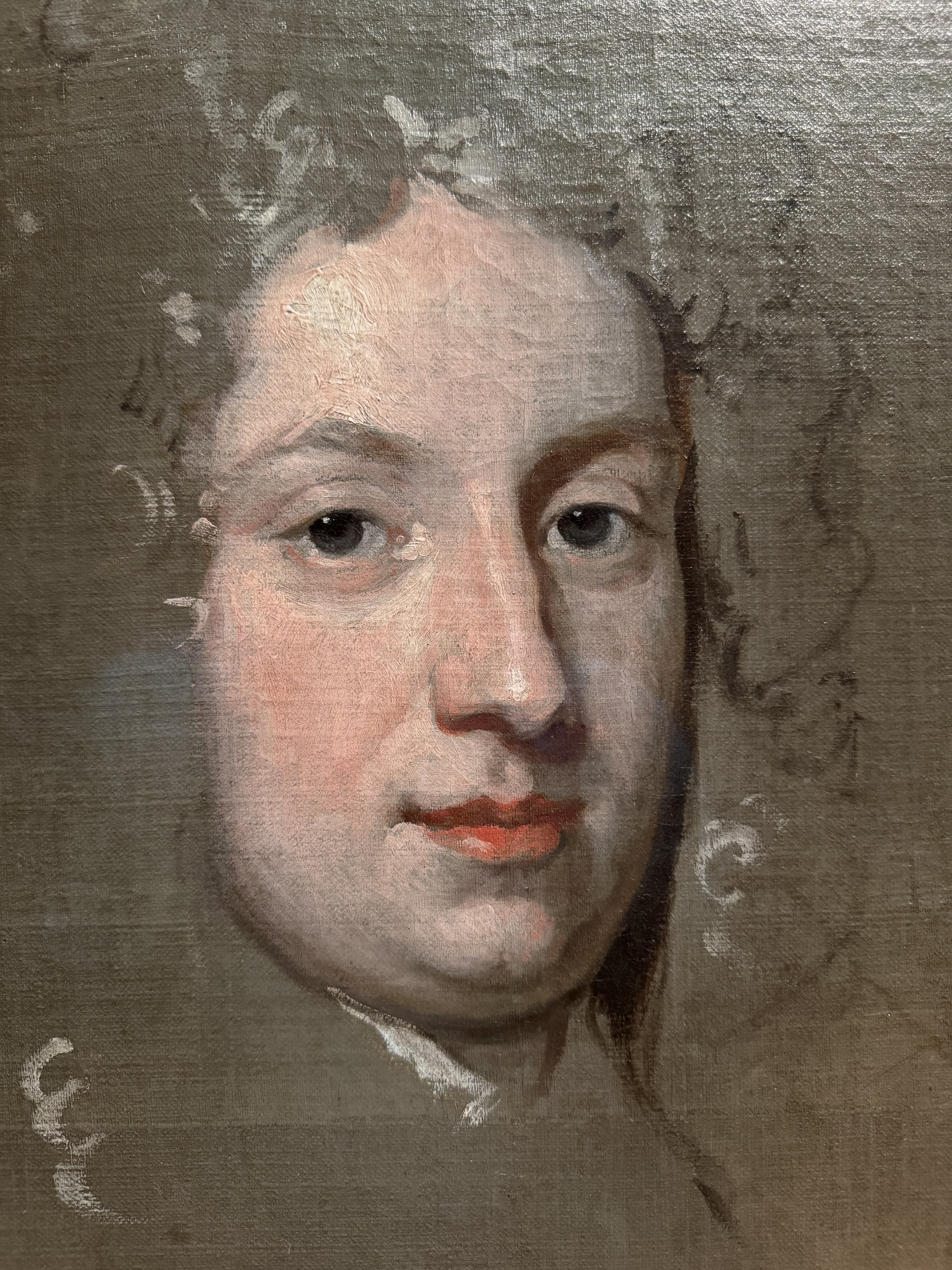
Close-up of the unfinished Richard Boyle, 2nd Viscount Shannon, 1710

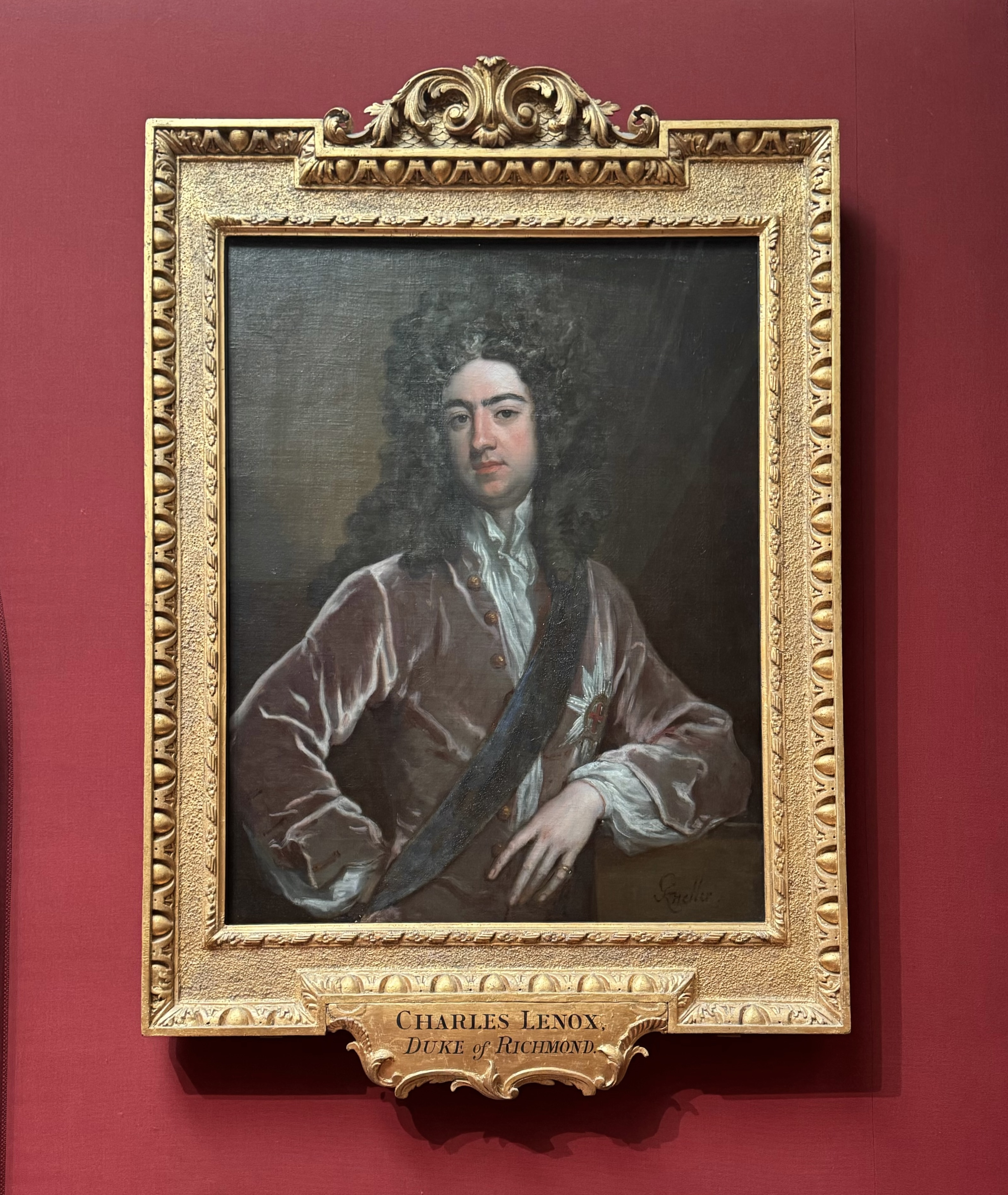
Charles Lennox, 1st Duke of Richmond and Lennox, c. 1703

== See also ==
- English school of painting
- Kneller Hall

== Bibliography ==
- (in Dutch) Godfried & Johan Zacharias Kneller biography in De groote schouburgh der Nederlantsche konstschilders en schilderessen (1718) by Arnold Houbraken, courtesy of the Digital library for Dutch literature

Court offices
Preceded by Sir Peter Lely	Principal Painter in Ordinary to the King; 1680–1723	Succeeded by William Kent
Baronetage of Great Britain
New creation	Baronet (of Whitton); 1715–1723	Extinct
Preceded by Janssen baronets	Kneller baronets of Whitton; 24 May 1715	Succeeded by Warrender baronets
