= Robert Woodward (priest) =

English priest (1653–1702)

Robert Woodward (9 June 1653 – 13 February 1702) was an Anglican priest.

Woodward was born in Salford, Bedfordshire and educated at New College, Oxford. He graduated BCL in 1677; and DCL in 1686. He was ordained on 25 September 1681. He was Rector of Pewsey from 1685 until his death. Woodward served as Archdeacon of Wilts from 1681 until 1691; and Dean of Salisbury from then until his death.

Church of England titles
| Preceded by Seth Ward | Archdeacon of Wilts; 1681–1691 | Succeeded by Thomas Ward |
| Preceded by Thomas Pierce | Dean of Salisbury; 15 June 2015–present | Succeeded by Edward Young |
