= Cecil Plaxton =

Cecil Andrew Plaxton was an Anglican priest: the Archdeacon of Wiltshire from 1951 to 1974.

Born in 1902, he was educated at Magdalen College School, Oxford and St Edmund Hall, Oxford. After a period of study at Ripon College Cuddesdon he was ordained in 1927. Following a curacy at St Martin, Salisbury he held incumbencies at Devizes, Weymouth and Pewsey.

He died on 2 February 1993.

Church of England titles
Preceded by Joseph William Coulter	Archdeacon of Wiltshire; 1951–1974	Succeeded by John Robert Geoffrey Neale
