= John Smith (archdeacon of Wiltshire) =

Anglican priest

Brian John Smith (1933–2000) was an Anglican priest who served as the Archdeacon of Wiltshire, England, from 1980 to 1998.

Born on 21 September 1933, he was educated at St Marylebone Grammar School, Mill Hill School and St John's College, Durham. After an earlier career as a photographer he was ordained in 1966. His first post was curate at All Saints’, Whitstable. After this he was Vicar of Wilsford then Maiden Bradley. He was Rural Dean of Heytesbury before becoming an archdeacon.

He died on 22 June 2000.

Church of England titles
Preceded by John Robert Geoffrey Neale	Archdeacon of Wiltshire; 1980–1998	Succeeded by Barnabas John Hopkinson
