= Lou Sladen =

British youth leader

- Born: Louis Sladen; 1918 or 1919
- Died: 1 January 1996 (aged 77); Littlebredy, Dorset
- Other name: Uncle Lou
- Occupations: Military pilot; Youth leader
- Years active: ‒1980s
- Known for: Leamington Boys' Club; Colliton Street Youth Centre, Dorchester
- Spouse: Peggy Harrington (m. 1945)
- Children: 2

Louis Sladen known as Lou Sladen (died 1 January 1996) was a senior youth leader in the United Kingdom and member of the British Red Cross.

== World War II ==
Warrant officer Louis Sladen flew as a Royal Air Force pilot during World War II. While piloting a Vickers Wellington bomber on 20 April 1941 he was shot down over North Africa or the Middle East. By 3 May 1941 he had been reported missing. After being captured, Sladen was held at various German prisoner-of-war camps in World War II. He met Douglas Bader while held at Stalag Luft III. Sladen had been organising sports at the prisoner of war camp.

== Youth work ==
=== Kendal ===
Between 1947‒1949 Lou Sladen was leader of Kendal Lad's club.

=== Leamington Spa ===
By April 1951, Sladen had been working at as the club leader at Leamington Boys' Club for 21 months.

=== East London ===
During the mid-1950s, Sladen was general secretary of Mansfield House University Settlement for seven years.

=== Wales ===
In the late-1950s Lou Sladen had trained the first trial round of The Duke of Edinburgh's Award (DofE) gold award winners in Monmouthshire, Wales; and on the Brecon Beacons.

From 1959 Sladen was field officer of the Welsh Association of Youth Clubs (later: Youth Cymru), responsible for arranging lectures and training programmes. In June 1960 The Duke of Edinburgh's Award was expanded for girls and led by Kathleen Ellum in Pontypool, with Sladen directing the programme for the Monmouthshire Federation of Youth Clubs.

From January‒May 1961 Sladen ran a young leader training programme in Newport.

In mid-1962, Sladen left the Welsh Association of Youth Clubs, and took up a similar post covering Devon and Cornwall.

=== Dorset ===
In 1964, Sladen was working for the National Association of Youth Clubs, including covering the Wiltshire area.

In 1965, Sladen was the leader of camp activities during a conference held at Butlin's Minehead. During the visit of Princess Margaret, Countess of Snowdon and Antony Armstrong-Jones, 1st Earl of Snowdon the royal visitors were escorted by Lou Sladen and Billy Butlin.

As of 1966, Sladen remained South West Regional Officer, of the National Association of Youth Clubs.

==== Dorchester ====
During the mid-1970s Sladen was the leader at Colliton Street Youth Club in Dorchester. In 1979 he retired as leader at the Colliton Street Youth Centre in Dorchester. In 1980 Sladen returned to the Colliton Street Youth Centre to present medals.

In 1999, a room at Dorchester's new youth centre on King's Road, was named "The Lou Sladen Community Room". The room features a four-square-metre giant chess board.

==== Red Cross ====
During September 1979, Sladen was appointed by the Dorset branch of the British Red Cross Society as its youth and junior's officer.

== Family ==
Louis Sladen's parents worked in confectionery in Llantrisant, Glamorgan, Wales. His father was J. Sladen, who on 9 June 1906 father rescued an unconscious five-year-old child from the Glamorganshire Canal.

After the end of World War II, Sladen was engaged to Peggy (née Harrington), also from Llantrisant, in June 1945. Sladen was married to Peggy Sladen until his death at the beginning of 1996. Peggy Sladen had been matron at the cottage hospital in Lyme Regis from 1962‒1974. They had a daughter Janie Gray and grandson Simon Baines; plus another daughter Nerissa Douglas, and granddaughter Clare. The Douglas part of the family emigrated to Canada in 1973.

Lou Sladen died aged 77 on 1 January 1996 at home in Littlebredy, Dorset. A thanksgiving service was held later on 12 January 1996 at St Michael and All Angels Church, Littlebredy, with a collection for the RAF Benevolent Fund. Sladen's wife Peggy Sladen died aged 79, at Dorset County Hospital, on 26 June 2001. Their daughter Nerissa died on 13 January 2026, also aged 79—in Guelph, Canada, where Nerissa had lived since 1975.

In 1976, Sladen was fined £20 for driving over the speed limit.
