= Richard Brickenden =

- Born: 1701
- Died: 1 March 1779

Richard Brickenden (1701–1779) was the Archdeacon of Wilts from 24 September 1768 until his death.

== Education ==
Richard Brickenden the son of Colwell Brickenden, was educated at John Roysse's Free School in Abingdon, (now Abingdon School) from 1711-1715. and later Corpus Christi College, Oxford B.A (1719), M.A (1723) and ordained priest (1725).

== Career ==
He was Bachelor of Divinity (1730) and Doctor of Divinity (1735). He held livings at Buttermere, Wiltshire, Oborne and Chilton Foliat. The family owned the Advowson and Richard was also Rector of Appleton.

He died on 1 March 1779.

Church of England titles
Preceded by Charles Weston	Archdeacon of Wilts; 1768–1779	Succeeded by Arthur Coham

== See also ==
- List of Old Abingdonians
