= John Douglas (bishop of Salisbury) =

Scottish scholar and Anglican bishop (1721–1807)

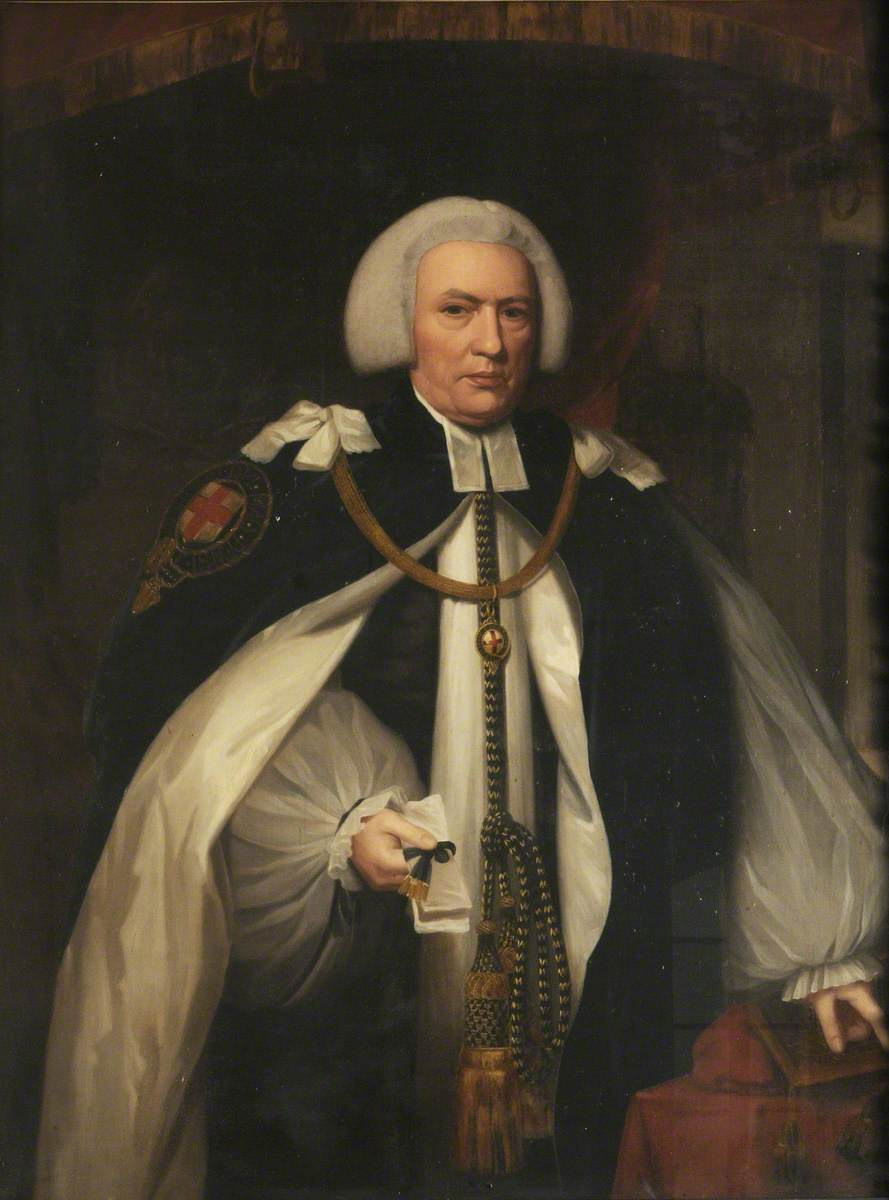
Bishop Douglas, wearing the mantle of a Canon of Windsor

John Douglas (14 July 1721 – 18 May 1807) was a Scottish scholar and Anglican bishop.

== Early life and education ==
Douglas was born at Pittenweem, Fife, the second son of shopkeeper Archibald Douglas, and Isabel, daughter of Robert Melvill of Carsendor. His father was later Wagon-Master-General to the British Forces and died at the Battle of Dettingen in Frankfurt in 1743. Douglas was educated at Dunbar, East Lothian, and at Balliol College, Oxford, where he gained his M.A. degree in 1743.

== Career ==
As chaplain to the 3rd Regiment of Foot Guards, he was at the Battle of Fontenoy, 1745. He then returned to Balliol as a Snell Exhibitioner; became Vicar of High Ercall, Shropshire in 1750; a Canon of Windsor, namely Canon of the Eleventh Stall at St George's Chapel, Windsor (1762–1776); a member of the chapter of St Paul's Cathedral in 1777; Bishop of Carlisle in 1787; Dean of Windsor in 1788; and Bishop of Salisbury in 1791. As Bishop of Salisbury he was also ex officio Chancellor of the Order of the Garter. Other honours were the degree of DD (1758), and those of Fellow of the Royal Society and Fellow of the Society of Antiquaries.

Douglas was not an outstanding churchman. He preferred to stay in London in winter and at fashionable watering places in summer. Under the patronage of the Earl of Bath he entered into several literary controversies. He defended John Milton against William Lauder's charge of plagiarism (1750), and attacked David Hume's rationalism in his Letter on the Criterion of Miracles (1754); he went on to criticise the followers of John Hutchinson in his Apology for the Clergy (1755). He also edited Captain Cook's Journals, and Clarendon's Diary and Letters (1763). A volume of Miscellaneous Works; prefaced by a short biography, was published posthumously in 1820.

== Family ==
In 1752, Douglas married Dorothea Pershouse, daughter of William Pershouse (or Persehouse) of Reynolds Hall, Stafford, but she died within three months. In 1765, he married secondly Elizabeth Rooke, daughter of Henry Brudenell Rooke. They had one son, Rev. William Douglas (1768–1819), Archdeacon of Wilts from 1799 to 1804.

A sister of his kept the British Coffee House, one of London's significant meeting places, especially for Scotsmen.

Church of England titles
Preceded by Edmund Law	Bishop of Carlisle; 1787–1791	Succeeded by Edward Venables-Vernon
Preceded by John Harley	Dean of Windsor; 1788–1791	Succeeded by Hon. James Cornwallis
Preceded by Shute Barrington	Bishop of Salisbury; 1791–1807	Succeeded by John Fisher
