= Frederick Wallis =

Frederick Wallis may refer to:

- Frederic Wallis (1853–1928), Anglican priest
- Frederick A. Wallis (Democrat), 8th director of Ellis Island, from 1920 to 1921
- Frederick Samuel Wallis (1857–1939), trade unionist and politician in South Australia
- Frederick H. Wallis, architect
