= Chosen Hill School =

Academy in England

Coordinates: 51°52′47″N 2°09′38″W

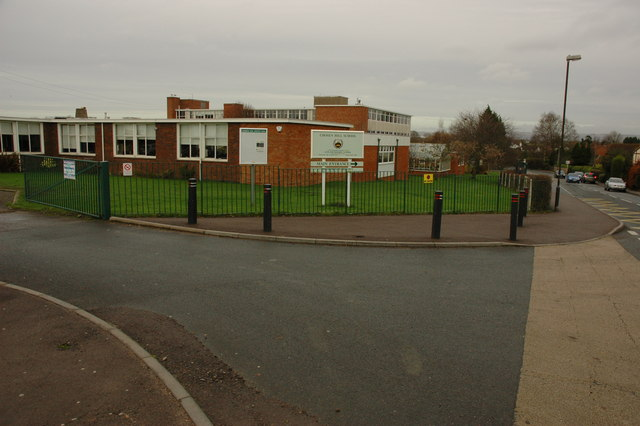

Location
- Brookfield Road; Brookfield Rd, Churchdown, Gloucester GL3 2PL, United Kingdom; Churchdown, Gloucestershire, GL3 2PL; England

Information
- Type: Academy, Comprehensive school
- Motto: Carpe Diem (Seize the day)
- Established: 1959
- Department for Education URN: 136623 Tables
- Ofsted: Reports
- Head teacher: Matt Pauling
- Staff: 150+
- Gender: Any
- Age: 11 to 18
- Enrolment: 1,290+
- Houses: Scott; Whittle; Masefield; Carne
- Colour: Bottle green
- Publication: CHS
- Website: www.chosenhillschool.co.uk

Chosen Hill School is a co-educational academy school in the village of Churchdown in Gloucestershire, England, between Cheltenham and Gloucester. It is also a Beacon School. It was ranked by The Daily Telegraph in 2008, as being the most over-subscribed school in Gloucestershire. In June 2009, it was recognised by Ofsted as 'outstanding'.

== History ==
Chosen Hill School was established in September 1959, as a selective grammar technical school. It was opened in 1960 by Peter Scott. According to the Cheltenham Chronicle, the school's first year measured 270 pupils and 14 staff teachers and the pioneer headmaster was David Gould. A year later there were 390 children and a staff of 21. By September 1961 there were over 500 pupils with a staff of 26.

In September 1970, the school began the transformation into a 'progressive' comprehensive school. By this time the catchment area stretched as far as Warden Hill, Coombe Glen and Shurdington on the east side of Cheltenham and also included half of Churchdown village. The children were split into streams, with the top streams entered for O levels and the bottom streams taking CSEs. Later, pupils were divided into three streams: top, middle and bottom.

The sixth form block was opened in September 1972. In 1974, the new upper school block opened which contained an art room, commerce room, eleven classrooms, dining area and kitchens. By this time, the school roll had increased to 1,048 and up to 60 staff. In 1997, the school achieved specialist Technology College status, and in 2002 it was awarded Beacon Status.

In July 2006, Gloucestershire County Council announced that it was providing £1.9 million to Chosen Hill School to renivate classrooms. In 2011, the school officially became an academy under the new Conservative-Liberal Democrat school policy. In 2012, the school received 'satisfactory' in an Ofsted inspection.

== Headteachers ==
- David Gould (1959–1977)
- R G Lacock (1977–1988)
- Alan Winwood (1988–2002)
- Susan Turner (2002–2016)
- Kirsten Harrison (2016–2021)
- Matt Pauling (2021–present)

== Notable alumni ==
- Phil Greening, England rugby player
- Rod Thomas, Wales international footballer
- Sue Groom, Archdeacon of Wilts since 2016
- Jack Lisowski, professional snooker player
