= William Macdonald (priest) =

William Maurice Macdonald, M.A. (10 August 1783 – 24 June 1862) was the Archdeacon of Wilts from 1828 until his death, at which time he was also the incumbent at Bishops Cannings, Prebendary of Bitton and a Canon Residentiary at Salisbury Cathedral.

Church of England titles
Preceded by William Coxe	Archdeacon of Wiltshire; 1828–1862	Succeeded by Henry Drury
