= Walter Bennett =

Walter Bennett may refer to:

- Walter Bennett (footballer, born 1874) (1874–1908), English international footballer (Sheffield United)
- Walter Bennett (footballer, born 1901) (1901–1988), English footballer (Bristol City, Chelsea, Southend United)
- Walter Bennett (footballer, born 1918) (1918–2009), English footballer (Barnsley, Doncaster Rovers)
- Walter Bennett (footballer, born 1997), Aruban footballer
- Walter Bennett (rugby union) (1906–1979), Australian rugby union player
- Walter Bennett (politician) (1864–1934), Australian politician
- Dr. Walter Bennett, a fictional character in the video game Half-Life: Blue Shift

== See also ==
- Walter Benet (died 1614), Anglican priest
