= Leche =

Leche (Spanish: "milk") may refer to:

- Leche (surname)
- Leche (Fobia album), 1993
- Leche (Illya Kuryaki and the Valderramas album), 1999
- Leche, a 2010 album by Gregory and the Hawk
- Leche frita, a Spanish sweet

== See also ==
- Laguna de Leche, the largest natural fresh water lake in Cuba
- Lech (disambiguation)
