= Osmond Fisher =

English clergyman and geologist

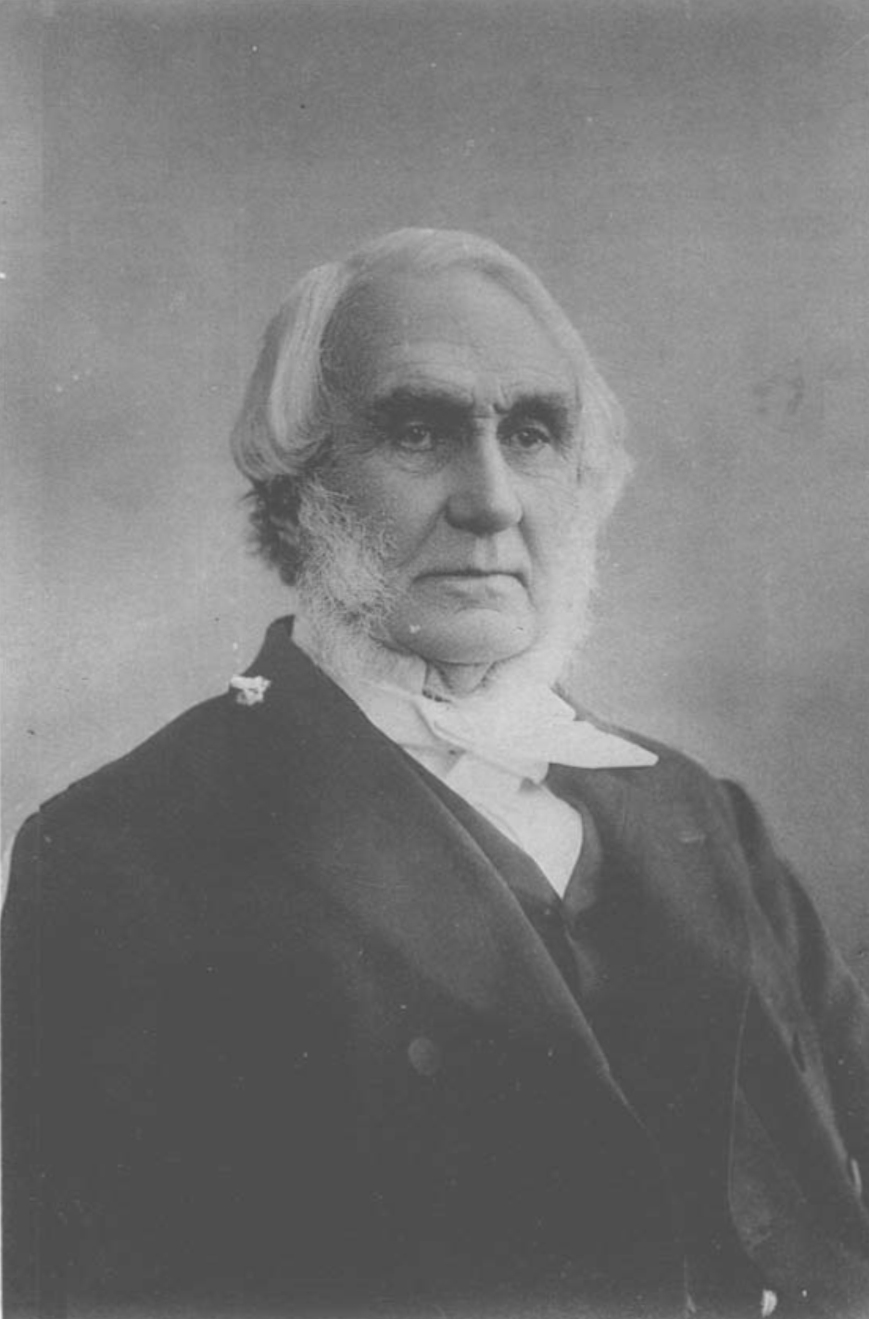
- Born: 17 November 1817
- Died: 12 July 1914 (aged 96)
- Occupation: Geologist, cleric
- Awards: Wollaston Medal (1913)

Reverend Osmond Fisher (17 November 1817 – 12 July 1914) was an English clergyman, geologist and geophysicist. He was one of the first geologists to propose the idea that the Earth consisted of a solid crust floating above a fluid core.

== Early life and education ==
Fisher was born in Osmington, Dorset, the son of clergyman John Fisher (1788–1832) who was Vicar of Osmington and Canon of Salisbury. Young Fisher was named after Saint Osmond, the patron saint of the church where his father served.

He took an interest in geology from an early age, collecting fossils at Dorset and Wiltshire with his uncle, Reverend George Cookson. He studied at Eton under John Keate, then under his uncle Reverend W. Fisher in Poulshot, Wiltshire and then with his grandfather, Rev. Philip Fisher, Master of the Charterhouse. Fisher also attended King's College London, where he listened to the lectures of Charles Lyell and John Frederic Daniell.

In 1836, Fisher joined Jesus College, Cambridge, studying mathematics. While in Cambridge, he also attended lectures by prominent geologist Adam Sedgwick. He graduated 18th Wrangler in 1841.

== Career ==
Fisher was ordained as a deacon in 1844, succeeding his uncle Cookson at Writhlington, Somerset. In 1845, he was ordained as a priest. In 1853, he became a tutor at Jesus College, Cambridge.

Fisher worked on the geomorphology of Norfolk, as well as the stratigraphy and invertebrate fossils of Dorset.

In 1881, he published The Physics of the Earth’s Crust, in which he postulated a non-homogenous composition of the Earth. He speculated that the crust may sit atop a liquid layer. This was the most prominent work on the topic since Alexander von Humboldt, but it went largely ignored until the work of Alfred Wegener. Much of his work into continental drift was ridiculed, as other geologists of the time clung to Solid State Theory. However, Fisher's observations were based on careful scientific deductions rather than speculation.

Fisher recognized and supported Thomas Jamieson's observation that ice could press down upon the crust and that the land could rise after glacial melt. He also published theories on the moon, proposing that the Pacific Ocean was the mark left where the moon split from the earth. This theory turned out to be incorrect: the Pacific Ocean is chemically dissimilar and much younger than the moon.

Fisher has been called the author of the first geophysics textbook. He was the recipient of the Murchison Medal in 1893 and the Wollaston Medal in 1913. In 1852, he was proposed as a Fellow of the Geological Society by Sedgwick. Fisher was elected Honorary Fellow of King's College in 1878 and of Jesus College in 1893.

Fisher married Maria Louisa, daughter of Hastings N. Middleton of Dorchester, in 1857.
