= Thomas Buchanan (priest) =

Cleric of the Church of England and Archdeacon of Wilts (1874-1911)

Thomas Boughton Buchanan (1833 – 28 June 1924) was a cleric in the Church of England. He was the Archdeacon of Wilts from 1874 until 1911.

Born in 1833, he was educated at Exeter College, Oxford and ordained in 1857. After a curacy in Wilton he was rector of Wishford Magna from 1863. Appointed a chaplain to George Moberly, Bishop of Salisbury, in 1870, the following year he became vicar of Potterne. He was rector of Poulshot from 1891 to 1905 and a Residentiary Canon at Salisbury Cathedral from 1894.

During his incumbency at Poulshot, where the church was some distance from the village, he instigated the provision of a chapel-of-ease which was built in 1897 on land adjacent to his rectory.

He died on 28 June 1924.

Church of England titles
| Preceded by Thomas Stanton | Archdeacon of Wiltshire; 1874–1911 | Succeeded by Frederic Wallis |
