= Charles Weston =

Charles Weston may refer to:

- Charles Weston, 3rd Earl of Portland (1639–1665)
- Charles Weston (horticulturalist) (1866–1935), active in Eastern states of Australia
- Charles Weston (Royal Navy officer) (1922–1999), president of the Royal Naval College, Greenwich
- Charles Weston (priest), Anglican cleric

== See also ==
- Charlie Weston (born 2004), English footballer
