= John Lawrence =

John or Johnny Lawrence may refer to:

== Politicians ==
- John Lawrence (lord mayor) (died 1692), lord mayor of London
- John Lawrence (mayor of Philadelphia) (1724–1799), mayor of Philadelphia
- John Lawrence (New York politician) (1618–1699), mayor of New York City
- John Lawrence (Pennsylvania politician) (born 1978), member of the Pennsylvania House of Representatives
- John W. Lawrence (1800–1888), U.S. Representative from New York
- John Lawrence, 2nd Baron Lawrence (1846–1913), British peer and Conservative politician
- John L. Lawrence (1785–1849), American lawyer, diplomat and politician from New York

== Others ==
- John Lawrence (1609–1667), early settler of Watertown, Massachusetts in 1630, later Selectman of Groton, Massachusetts
- John Lawrence, colonial Surveyor-General, drew the Lawrence Line (1743) dividing Provinces of East Jersey and West Jersey (New Jersey)
- John Lawrence (illustrator) (born 1933), English illustrator and wood engraver
- John Lawrence (martyr) (died 1555), English Protestant martyr
- John Lawrence, Irish landowner, owner of Ballymore Castle
- John Lawrence (musician) a.k.a. Infinity Chimps, Welsh musician
- John Lawrence (writer) (1753–1839), British writer on horses who was an early advocate of animal rights
- John Lawrence, 1st Baron Lawrence (1811–1879), Viceroy of India
- John Lawrence, 2nd Baron Oaksey (1929–2012), British aristocrat, amateur jockey and horse racing commentator and journalist
- John Craig Lawrence (born 1963), British Army officer
- John Lawrence (political activist) (1915–2002), British socialist activist
- John Lawrence (priest), English Anglican priest
- John H. Lawrence (1904–1991), American physicist and pioneer in nuclear medicine
- John Lawrence (cricketer) (born 1957), South African cricketer
- Col. John Lawrence, fictional character in Merry Christmas, Mr. Lawrence (1983 film)
- John Shelton Lawrence, American professor of philosophy and non-fiction writer
- Johnny Lawrence (cricketer) (1911–1988), English cricketer
- John Geddes Lawrence, Jr., American medical technologist and co-plaintiff in United States Supreme Court case Lawrence v. Texas
- Johnny Lawrence (character), fictional character from The Karate Kid franchise

== See also ==
- Jack Lawrence (disambiguation)
