= Leche (surname) =

Leche is a surname. Notable people with the surname include:

- James Leche (born by 1518–54), Welsh MP
- Joan Leche (c. 1450 – 1530), English benefactress
- Johan Leche (1704–1764), Swedish physician and naturalist
- Paul Leche (1857–1938), Justice of the Louisiana Supreme Court
- Richard W. Leche (1898–1965), governor of Louisiana, 1936–1939
- Roger Leche (died 1416), English courtier, MP and Lord High Treasurer
- Thomas Leche (1581–1646), Archdeacon of Wilt
- Wilhelm Leche (1850–1927), Swedish zoologist
