= List of churches in West Dorset =

The following is a list of churches in West Dorset.

== List ==
- St. Mary's Church, Bridport
- St Mary's Church, Charminster
- St Peter's Church, Chetnole
- St Michael and All Angels Church, Littlebredy
- Church of St Candida and Holy Cross, Whitchurch Canonicorum
- Holy Trinity Church, Fleet
- Holy Trinity Old Church, Bothenhampton
- St Peter's Church, Eype
- St Peter's Church, Portesham
