= Eric Bodington =

British archdeacon (1862–1929)

Eric James Bodington was an eminent Anglican priest and author in the early decades of the twentieth century.

Born on 17 December 1862, he was educated at Brasenose College, Oxford and ordained in 1886. After a curacy at St George, Fordington he was rector of Christ Church, Burgersdorp, South Africa and then Warden of St Peter's Home, Grahamstown. Returning to England in 1894 he held incumbencies at Osmington, Potterne and Calne. He was Archdeacon of Wilts from 1912 to 1927; and of Dorset from 1927 until his death on 25 October 1929, during which latter time he was also a Canon Residentiary at Salisbury Cathedral.

Works by Bodington include "God and Ourselves" (1890); "A Short History and Exposition of the Apostles' Creed and of the first eight of the thirty-nine Articles of Religion" (1893); "A History of Devizes" (1903); and "God with us" (1923).

His scholarly contributions include a transcription of the 1649–1650 Church Survey in Wilts, in several volumes of the Wiltshire Archaeological and Natural History Magazine, 1918 onwards.
