= Cornelius Yate =

Anglican priest

Cornelius Yate (some sources Yeate) (6 March 1651 – 12 April 1720) was an Anglican priest: the Archdeacon of Wilts from 9 April 1696 until his death.

Yate was born in Evesham and educated at St Mary Hall, Oxford. He graduated B.A. in 1671; and M.A. in 1674. He served curacies at Charney Bassett and Denchworth. In 1677 he became Vicar of Marlborough and in 1690 Prebendary of Bishopstone at Salisbury Cathedral.
