= Sue Groom =

English Anglican priest (born 1963)

Susan Anne Groom (born 28 March 1963 in Wokingham) is a retired Anglican priest. She was the Archdeacon of Wilts from 2016 until her May 2024 retirement.

Groom was educated at Chosen Hill School; Bangor University; Hughes Hall, Cambridge; London Bible College; the Open University; and the University of St Mark & St John. She was ordained deacon in 1996, and priest in 1997. After curacies at Harefield and Eastcote she was vicar of Yiewsley (London Borough of Hillingdon) from 2001 to 2007. She was the Director of Deanery Licensed Ministers for the Diocese of London from 2007 to 2009; priest-in-charge of the united benefice of Henlow and Langford, Bedfordshire (Diocese of St Albans); then Director of Ordinands for the Diocese of St Albans from 2009 to 2016.
