= Jack Lawrence =

Jack Lawrence may refer to:

- Jack Lawrence (songwriter) (1912–2009), American songwriter
- Jack Lawrence (artist) (born 1975), British comic book artist and animator
- Jack Lawrence (bluegrass) (born 1953), American bluegrass guitarist
- Jack Lawrence (footballer) (born 1934), Australian rules footballer
- Jack Lawrence (bass guitarist) (born 1976), American bass guitarist
- Jack Lawrence (cricketer) (1904–1984), Irish cricketer
- Jack Lawrence (rugby league) (1897–?), Australian rugby player

== See also ==
- John Lawrence (disambiguation)
