= Walter Medlicott =

English cricketer

Personal information
- Full name: Walter Sandfield Medlicott
- Born: 28 August 1879; Potterne, Wiltshire, England
- Died: 24 June 1970 (aged 90); Bonchester Bridge, Roxburghshire, Scotland
- Batting: Right-handed

Domestic team information
- Years: Team
- 1898–1907: Wiltshire
- 1901–1902: Oxford University
- 1903–1911: Marylebone Cricket Club

Career statistics
Competition	First-class
Matches	13
Runs scored	423
Batting average	23.50
100s/50s	–/3
Top score	81
Catches/stumpings	13/–
- Source: Cricinfo, 28 June 2019

Walter Sandfield Medlicott (28 August 1879 – 24 June 1970) was an English first-class cricketer.

Medlicott was born at Potterne in Wiltshire to Henry Edmonstone Medlicott and his wife, Kate D'Oyley Medlicott (née Gale). He was educated at Harrow School, before going up to Magdalen College, Oxford. While studying at Oxford, Medlicott made his debut in first-class cricket for Oxford University against A. J. Webbe's XI at Oxford in 1901. He played first-class cricket for Oxford in the 1901 and 1902 seasons, making nine appearances. He scored 311 runs in these nine matches, at an average of 20.73 and a high score of 81. Medlicott also played first-class cricket for the Marylebone Cricket Club (MCC), making his debut for the team against Oxford University at Lord's in 1903. He made two further appearances for the MCC in 1904 against Cambridge University and Oxford University, before making a final appearance in 1911 against the touring Indians. He scored 112 runs in his four matches for the MCC, with a high score of 68. In addition to playing first-class cricket, Medlicott also played minor counties cricket for Wiltshire between 1898–1907, making 39 appearances in the Minor Counties Championship.

He served in the First World War, enlisting in the Northumberland Hussars as a second lieutenant in November 1914. He was made a temporary lieutenant in May 1915. He was made a full lieutenant in July 1917, while also holding the temporary rank of captain. He had married Lavender Mary Pease, daughter of Sir Alfred Pease, in October 1910. The couple had four children: three daughters and one son. He died at Bonchester Bridge in Scotland in June 1970.
