= William Douglas (priest) =

Anglican priest

Rev. William Douglas FRS (25 December 1768 – 19 March 1819) was a Scottish Anglican cleric who was the Archdeacon of Wilts from 1799 until 1804.

He was the only son of Scottish parents, John Douglas, Lord Bishop of Salisbury, and his second wife, Elizabeth, daughter of Henry Brudenell Rooke. He was educated at Christ Church, Oxford. He was Precentor of Salisbury Cathedral from 1804 and Prebendary of Westminster from 1807.

In Utrecht in 1794, he married Ann, daughter of Baron Frédéric Casimir de Brackel (Baron Von Brakel of Courland), of Yverdon-les-Bains in Switzerland, and his Scottish wife, Louise Kinloch, daughter of Sir James Kinloch of Gilmerton, 4th Baronet. Douglas was also an antiquarian who collected a library of nearly 3,000 books, which were sold at auction by Sotheby's on 10 December 1819.

He died in March 1819 at Dean's yard, Westminster, aged 50.
