= Arthur Coham =

Archdeacon of Wilts

Arthur Coham (1720 – 14 February 1799) was an English Anglican priest who was the Archdeacon of Wilts from 5 March 1779 until his death.

Coham was born in Bradford, Devon, the son of John and Margret Coham. He was educated at Exeter College, Oxford and graduated B.A. in 1842. He graduated M.A. from King's College, Cambridge in 1852.

He was ordained deacon in May 1743 and priest in December of that year. He held livings at Somerton, Suffolk (from 1753); Potterne, Wiltshire (1781); and Brixton Deverill, Wiltshire (1781). From 1756–59, he was chaplain to John Hume, bishop of Bristol.

He died in 1799, aged 80.
