= Thomas Sprott (bishop) =

Bishop (1856–1942)

Thomas Henry Sprott, OBE (26 September 1856 – 25 July 1942) was an Anglican priest in the first half of the 20th century.

== Life ==
Born on 26 September 1856 at Dromore, County Down, he was educated at Trinity College, Dublin and ordained in 1879. Following curacies at Holy Trinity, Kingston upon Hull and St John the Evangelist, Waterloo Road, he became Minister of St Barnabas', Mount Eden, Auckland in 1886.

From 1892 until 1911 Sprott was Vicar of St Paul's Pro-Cathedral, Wellington when he was elevated to the episcopate as the 4th bishop of Wellington, a post he held for 25 years. Described as a "a profound divine who for years tried to fathom the deeps of modern reasoning", he died on 25 July 1942. His wife Edith survived him and died in 1945, but his son (who was awarded the Military Cross in 1917) died on active service with the Norfolk Regiment in March 1918.

== Legacy ==
Sprott House, a residential home for the elderly in Wellington, New Zealand, is named for him.

== Notes ==
Church of England titles
Preceded by Frederic Wallis	Bishop of Wellington; 1911–1936	Succeeded by Herbert St Barbe Holland
