= Joseph Coulter =

Joe, Joey or Joseph Coulter may refer to:

- Joey Coulter (born 1990), American motorsports driver development coach and racing driver
- Joseph Coulter (American football) (1880–1943), American football player and coach
- Joseph Coulter (priest) (1867–1951), English Anglican priest who was the archdeacon of Wilts
- Joseph Robert Coulter (1913–2006), Canadian football player, pilot, and educator
