= Marston, Wiltshire =

Village in Wiltshire, England

Coordinates: 51.310°N 2.049°W

Marston
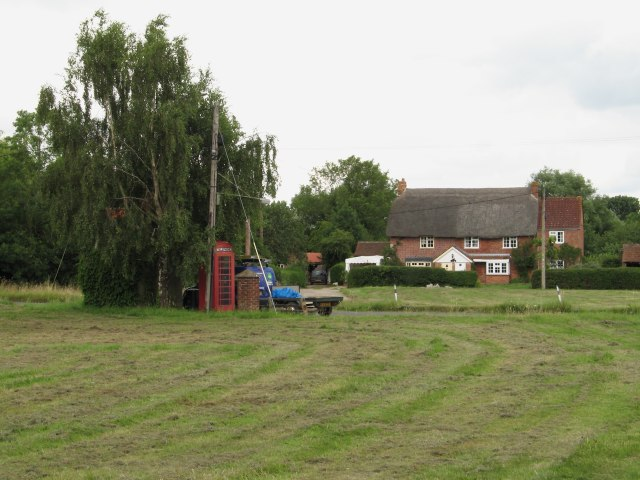
- Marston village green

- Location within Wiltshire
- Population: 177 (in 2011)
- OS grid reference: ST967568
- Civil parish: Marston
- Unitary authority: Wiltshire
- Ceremonial county: Wiltshire
- Region: South West
- Country: England
- Sovereign state: United Kingdom
- Post town: Devizes
- Postcode district: SN10
- Dialling code: 01380
- Police: Wiltshire
- Fire: Dorset and Wiltshire
- Ambulance: South Western
- UK Parliament: Melksham and Devizes

Marston is a small village and civil parish 4 miles (6.4 km) southwest of Devizes in Wiltshire, England. The parish lies south of Worton, away from main roads. Much of the boundary with Worton follows the Bulkington Brook, a tributary of the Semington Brook.

Marston and the adjacent Worton were tithings of Potterne parish. In 1852, after a church was built at Worton, the tithings became a chapelry of Potterne. Worton and Marston later became separate civil parishes, formalised in 1894.

The population of the parish peaked in the mid-19th century, reaching 190 at the time of the 1861 census. A decline followed, with a low point of 96 in 1931, after which numbers gradually increased to reach 177 in 2011.

The parish elects a parish council with five members.

There is a village green, with a Methodist chapel nearby. The nearest pub is the Rose and Crown in Worton, the Plough Inn at Marston having closed sometime before 1987. The nearest shop is the Post Office in Potterne. The local Anglican church is Christ Church, Worton, which was built in 1841 near the boundary with Marston in order to serve both villages.

In 2014, Good Energy applied for planning permission to create a 4.9MW solar energy installation near the village.
