= John Fisher (bishop of Salisbury) =

English bishop (1748–1825)

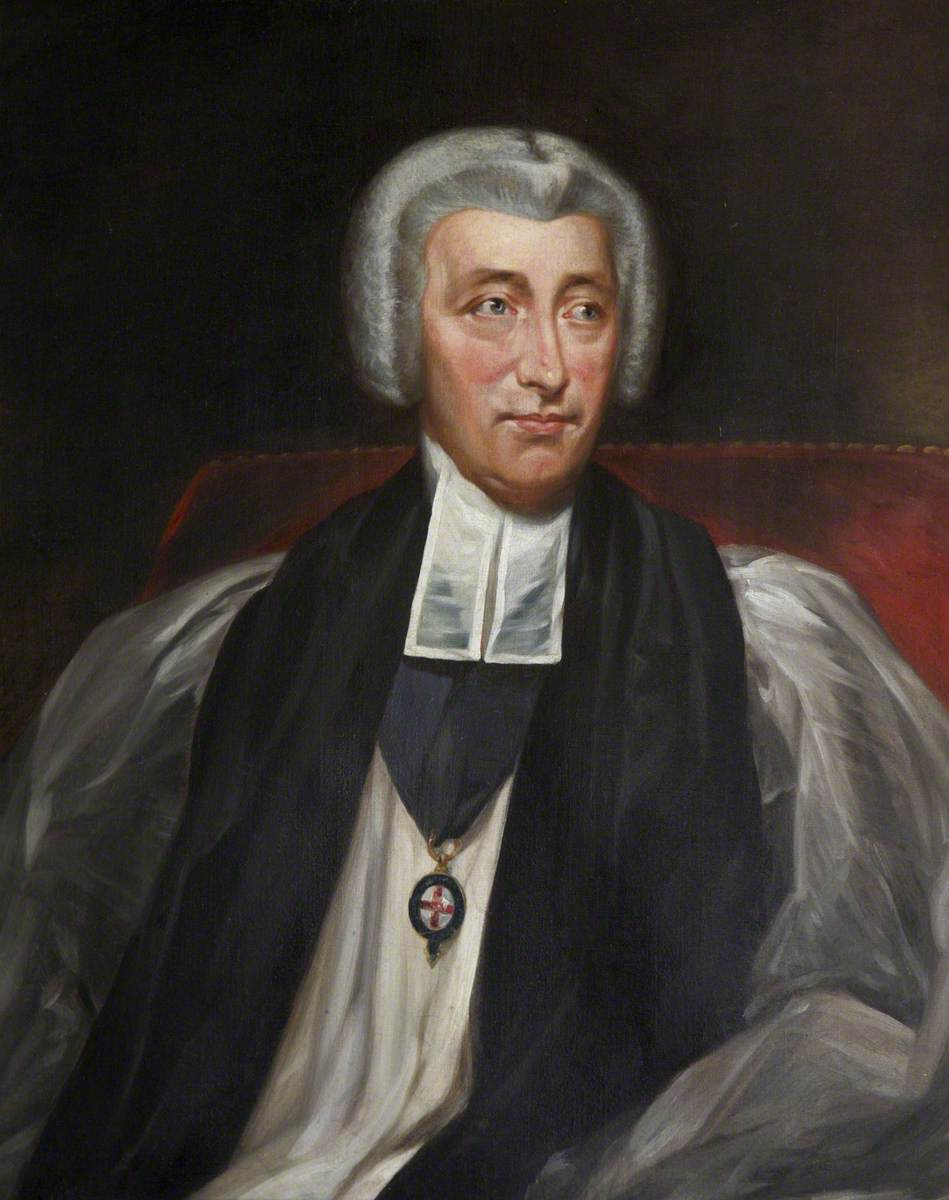
20th-century portrait of Fisher, artist unknown (Bishop's Palace, Exeter)

John Fisher (1748, Hampton – 8 May 1825, Seymour Street, London) was a Church of England bishop, serving as Bishop of Exeter, then Bishop of Salisbury.

== Life ==
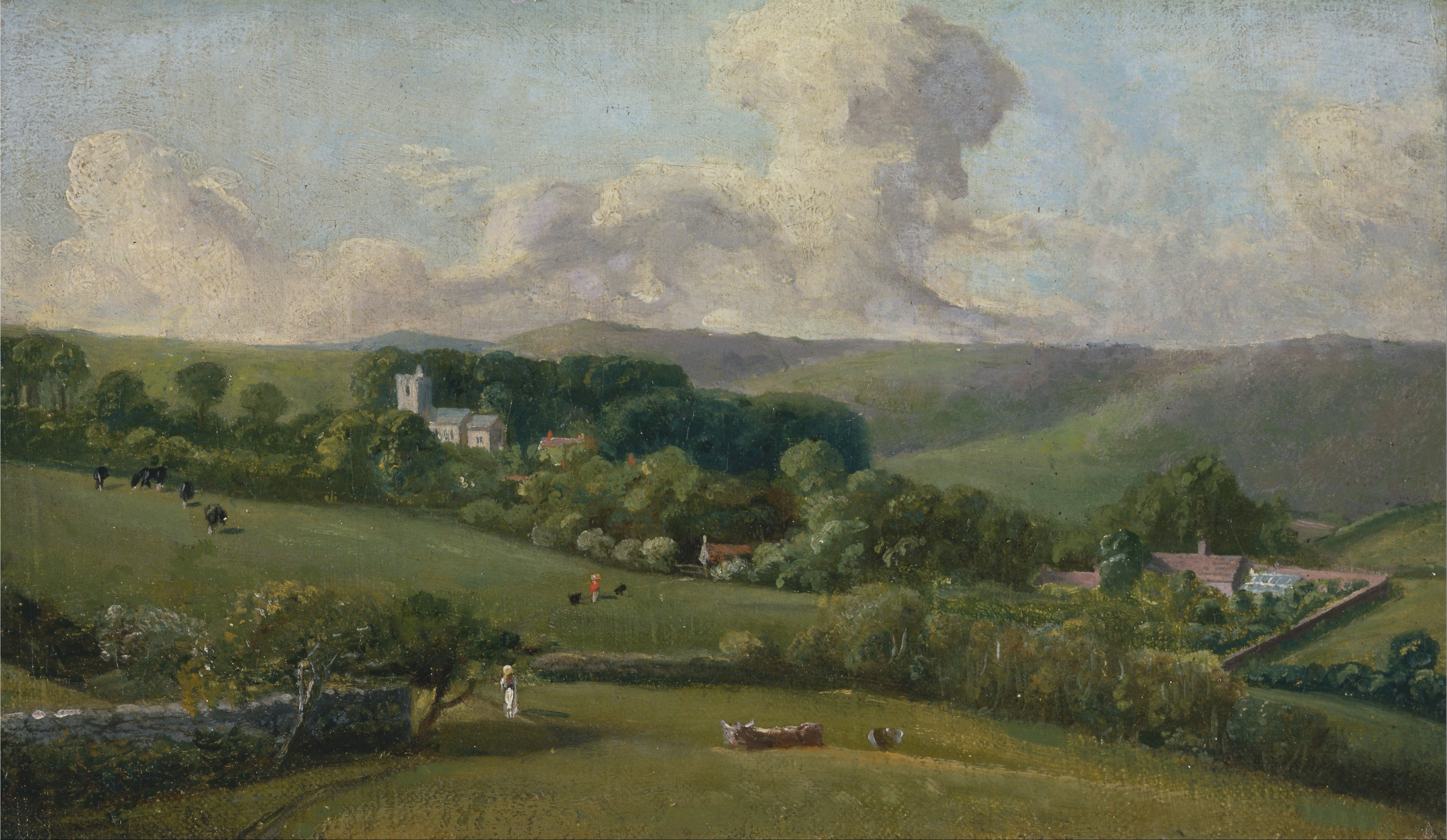
Painting of Osmington by Fisher

John Fisher was the eldest son of John Fisher, rector of Calbourne, Isle of Wight. He was educated at Peterborough, St Paul's School and Peterhouse, Cambridge. Graduating BA as 10th Wrangler in 1770, he gained his MA and became a Fellow of St John's College in 1773.

In 1780 he was appointed Preceptor to Prince Edward, Duke of Kent and in 1781 chaplain to King George III and Deputy Clerk of the Closet, a post he held until 1785. In 1786 he was made Canon of St George's Chapel, Windsor, and in 1805 was appointed Preceptor to Charlotte, Princess Royal, the only child of the Prince of Wales, the future George IV. Fisher also served as Chancellor of the Most Noble Order of the Garter.

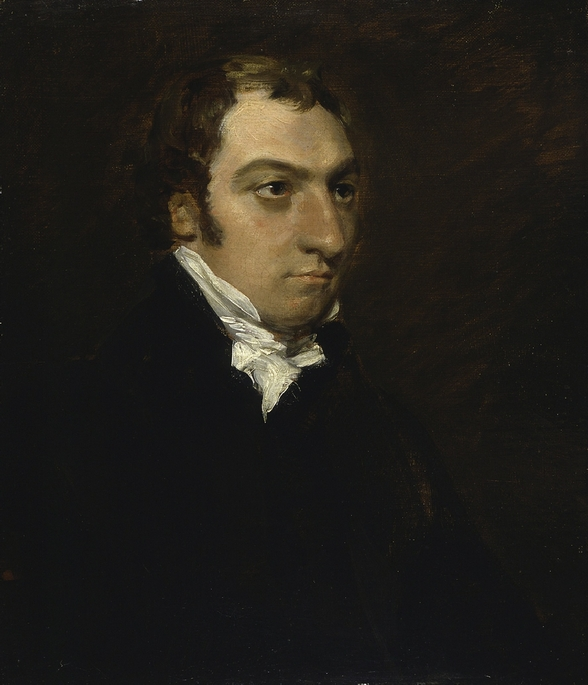
John Fisher, nephew of the Bishop, by John Constable, 1816 (Fitzwilliam Museum)

He served as vicar of Nether Stowey, Somerset, before being consecrated Bishop of Exeter in 1803 and then translated to Bishop of Salisbury in 1807, a position he held until his death in 1825. As Bishop of Salisbury he was also ex officio Chancellor of the Order of the Garter.

He is also notable for his friendship with the painter John Constable, presiding at Constable's wedding and commissioning his Salisbury Cathedral. Over time, Fisher became Constable's biggest patron and a close friend. Fisher himself was often called 'King's Fisher,' in reference to his connection to the Royal Family, and his patronage was a valuable asset to Constable.

Later, Fisher introduced the painter to Fisher's nephew, another John Fisher, the son of Fisher's brother Philip, Master of the Charterhouse School of London. The younger John Fisher (later the Archdeacon of Berkshire) became the painter's best friend and another important patron. The painter spent his honeymoon at the younger John Fisher's home in Osmington, Dorset. Relations between the Fisher families and the painter were such that biographer C. R. Leslie based much of his work on Constable – Memoirs of the Life of John Constable of 1843 – on correspondence between the Fishers and the painter.

On Fisher's death, Constable commemorated him in a painting with a rainbow alighting on Fisher's house in the Cathedral Close, Leaden Hall, now part of Salisbury Cathedral School. He is buried in St George's Chapel, Windsor. There is a funerary monument to him in Salisbury Cathedral sculpted by William Osmond.

== Family ==
John Fisher married Dorothea (Scrivener) Fisher, daughter of John Freston of Sibton Abbey, Yoxford, Suffolk, who had changed his name to Scrivener on an inheritance. Dorothea brought to the marriage a large income of £1700-a-year from the Scrivener estates in Suffolk. The couple had three children, Edward Fisher, who died unmarried, and two daughters, Dorothea, who married John Frederick Pike, who then assumed the additional name of Scrivener, and Elizabeth, who married John Mirehouse of Brownslade, Pembrokeshire, Wales, and Common Serjeant of London (1833–1850).

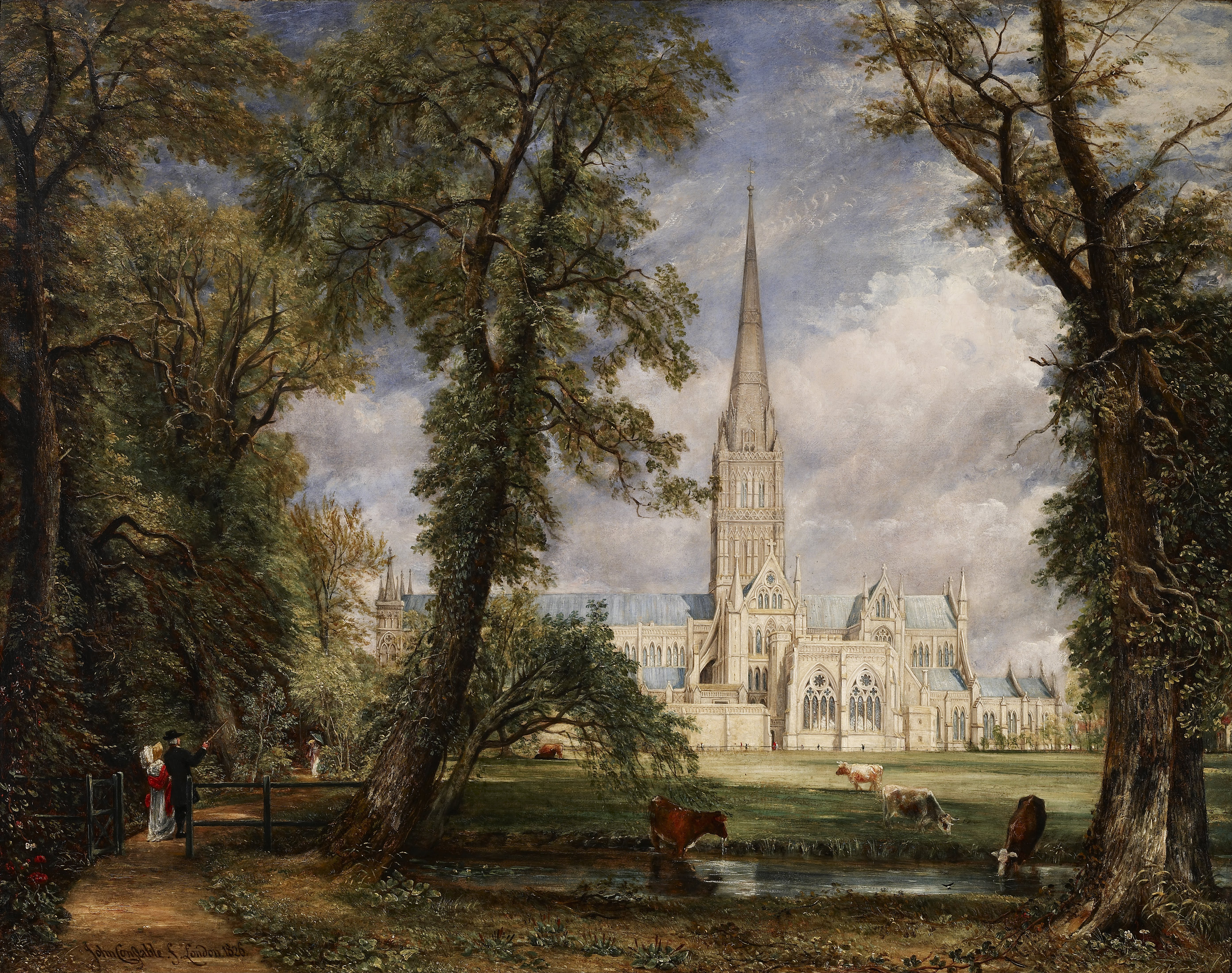
Salisbury Cathedral from the Bishop's Grounds, c. 1825, John Constable; the couple strolling along elm alley are Bishop of Salisbury John Fisher and his wife

== Arms ==
Coat of arms of John Fisher
Escutcheon Sable, on a mount vert two stags salient combatant argent. Other versions As a diocesan bishop, Fisher would impale his arms with those of his diocese.

Church of England titles
Preceded by Henry Reginald Courtenay	Bishop of Exeter; 1803–1807	Succeeded by George Pelham
Preceded by John Douglas	Bishop of Salisbury; 30 May 1807 – 21 May 1825	Succeeded by Thomas Burgess
