= Worton, Wiltshire =

Village in Wiltshire, England

Coordinates: 51.316°N 2.037°W

Worton
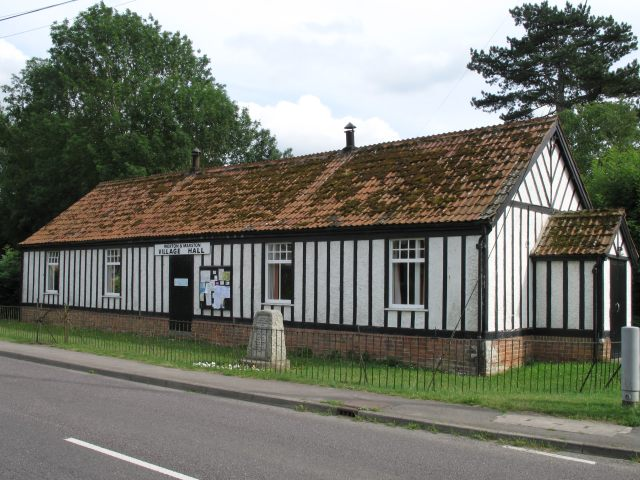
- Village hall of Worton and Marston

- Location within Wiltshire
- Population: 624 (in 2011)
- OS grid reference: ST975574
- Civil parish: Worton
- Unitary authority: Wiltshire
- Ceremonial county: Wiltshire
- Region: South West
- Country: England
- Sovereign state: United Kingdom
- Post town: Devizes
- Postcode district: SN10
- Dialling code: 01380
- Police: Wiltshire
- Fire: Dorset and Wiltshire
- Ambulance: South Western
- UK Parliament: Melksham and Devizes
- Website: Parish Council

Worton is a village and civil parish about 3 miles (5 km) southwest of Devizes in Wiltshire. It is near the northern edge of Salisbury Plain in central southern England.

== History ==
The first recorded mention of Worton was in a document of 1173.

Manor Farmhouse, on the south side of the High Street, began as a timber-framed building in the 16th century then was encased in brick in the 18th. The Grange, nearby to the west, is a 17th-century timber-framed building with later extensions.

Worton (and neighbouring Marston) were tithings of Potterne parish. In 1852, after Christ Church at Worton was consecrated, the tithings became a chapelry of Potterne. Worton and Marston later became separate civil parishes, formalised in 1894.

== Geography ==
The Bulkington Brook forms the southwestern boundary of the parish. The village is elongated, set around its High Street. The hamlet of Cuckold's Green is at the east end of Worton village.

Marston lies just to the south, and Potterne to the east, where the A360 road passes.

== Religious sites ==
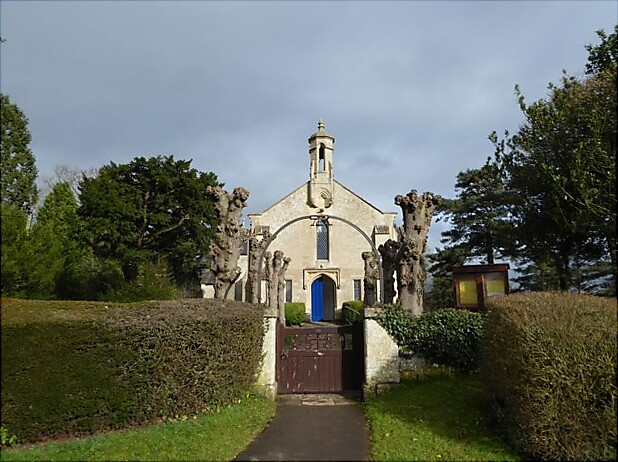
Christ Church, Worton

Christ Church, the Church of England parish church, was built to the south of the village street in 1841 to designs of T.H. Wyatt, to serve both Worton and Marston. Built in ashlar blocks, with an octagonal stone bellcote, the church is Grade II listed. Pevsner described its windows as "oddly tall, slim". The benefice was united with Poulshot in 1931 and today the parish is part of the Wellsprings Benefice, which also covers Potterne, Bulkington and Seend.

There is a small Methodist chapel at Marston. Worton had a larger chapel, built in 1849 to replace an earlier chapel; it closed in the 1990s.

== Amenities ==
The village hall serves Worton and Marston. Worton has a pub, the Rose and Crown, which is a Grade II listed 17th-century building.

Five Lanes Primary School has two sites, with younger children at Potterne and older children at Worton. The school at Worton was built in 1965 and replaced a school which began as a Sunday school in 1844.
