= Albert Edward Wilshire =

Organist and composer based in England

Albert Edward Wilshire FRCO LRAM (1863–1935) was an organist and composer based in England.

== Life ==
Wilshire was born in 1863 in Potterne, Wiltshire, the son of Charles Ross Wilshire and Julia Augusta.

He married Christina Gunn on 2 August 1893 in Wroxall. They had the following children:

- Christina Wilshire b. 1897
- Doreen Martin Wilshire b. 1900

== Appointments ==
- Assistant Organist of Salisbury Cathedral 1881 - 1884
- Organist of Ilfracombe Parish Church 1887 - 1902
- Organist of Wimborne Minster 1902 - 1915

== Compositions ==
His compositions include:

- 46th Psalm
- The Timbrels Sound (choral march)
- Part songs

Cultural offices
Preceded by J.E. Tidnam	Organist of Wimborne Minster; 1902-1915	Succeeded by G.E.C. Eyers
