= John Fisher (priest) =

Archdeacon of Berkshire from 1817 to 1832

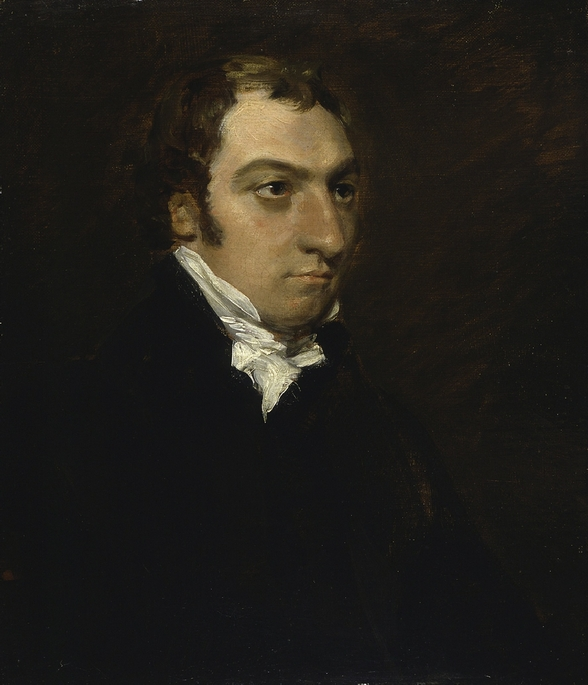
John Fisher by John Constable, 1816

The Ven John Fisher (30 May 1788 – 25 August 1832) was Archdeacon of Berkshire from 1817 to 1832.

Born at Brentford on 30 May 1788, he was educated at Charterhouse and Christ's College, Cambridge and ordained in 1812. His first post was as Domestic Chaplain to his uncle, the Bishop of Salisbury. He held incumbencies at Idmiston, Osmington, Winfrith Newburgh and Gillingham, Dorset. He was appointed a Canon of Salisbury Cathedral in 1819. His son Osmond Fisher was a noted geologist.

He died at Boulogne on 25 August 1832.

Church of England titles
Preceded by Arthur Onslow	Archdeacon of Berkshire; 1817 –1836	Succeeded by Edward Berens
