= William Williams (Weymouth MP) =

English politician (1774–1839)

Member of Parliament for Weymouth and Melcombe Regis
- In office 29 June 1818 – 27 June 1826

Personal details
- Born: 28 March 1774
- Died: 8 February 1839 (aged 64)
- Resting place: St Michael and All Angels Church, Littlebredy
- Party: Whig

William Williams (28 March 1774 – 8 February 1839) was an English politician who was Whig Member of Parliament for Weymouth and Melcombe Regis from 1818 to 1826.
