= Thomas Stanton (priest) =

Thomas Stanton (1806 or 1807 – 24 March 1875) was an Anglican cleric who was Archdeacon of Wilts from 1868 until 1874.

From Somerset, he was educated at Christ's College, Cambridge. After a curacy at Buckhurst Hill in Essex, he was rector of Holy Trinity at Shaftesbury in Dorset from 1846 to 1852; and of All Saints, Burbage, Wiltshire from then until 1874. He was appointed Canon of Sarum in 1859.

He died on 24 March 1875.

Church of England titles
Preceded by Charles Amyand Harris	Archdeacon of Wiltshire; 1868–1874	Succeeded by Thomas Boughton Buchanan
