= River Bride, Dorset =

River in Dorset, England

River Bride
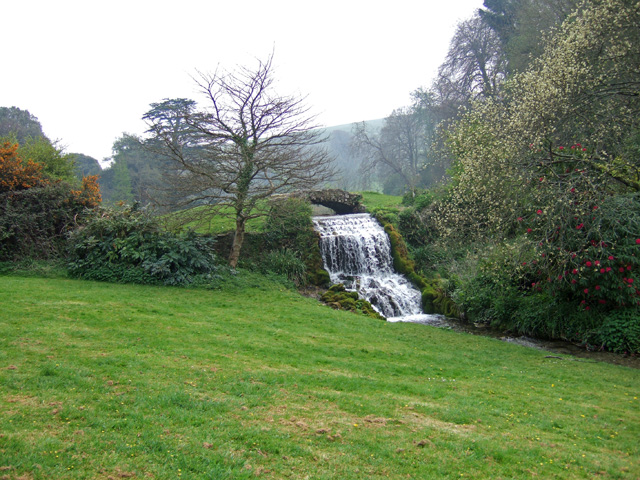
- Source of the River Bride at Bridehead House, Littlebredy

- Location within Dorset
- Etymology: Celtic

Location
- Country: England
- County: Dorset
- District: Dorset
- Towns and villages: Littlebredy, Burton Bradstock

Physical characteristics
- Source
  - location: Littlebredy, Dorset, England
  - elevation: 300 ft (91 m)
- Mouth
  - location: Burton Bradstock, Dorset, England
  - coordinates: 50.7026°N 2.7405°W
- Length: 10.5 km (6.5 mi)
- Discharge
  - location: Burton Bradstock

The River Bride is a river in Dorset, England, situated between the towns of Dorchester and Bridport. The river is a chalk stream and runs through the Bride Valley, a distinct landscape area in the Dorset National Landscape.

The River Bride is approximately 6.5 miles (10.5 km) long and has a catchment area of 15 square miles (39 km^{2}). It rises on the eastern side of Black Down at an altitude of 90 metres (300 ft) beneath an artificial lake at Bridehead House, Littlebredy on the escarpment of the Dorset Downs. It flows west to its mouth west of Burton Bradstock, reaching the coast through a break in coastal cliffs at Burton Freshwater. It empties into the English Channel over the western end of Chesil Beach where it "forms itself into a pool and fights to get to the sea intact before sinking into the shingle." It has nine tributaries and descends more than 60 metres (200 ft) in its first three miles.

The Bride Valley is a protected area as part of the Dorset National Landscape (an Area of Outstanding Natural Beauty). The National Landscape Partnership describe it as a broad clay valley having a sweeping profile enclosed by the chalk escarpment to the north and east, and smaller limestone escarpment to the south, with a "strong undeveloped rural character". Land use is primarily a patchwork of dairy pasture and wet woodland in the valley floor, and arable, scrub and calcareous grassland on the valley sides.

== Etymology ==
The river's name is of Celtic origin. It is derived from Old Welsh Brydi, related to Cornish bredion "to boil", so means "boiling or gushing" stream. The river gives its name to Long Bredy, Littlebredy, Burton Bradstock and probably Bridport.

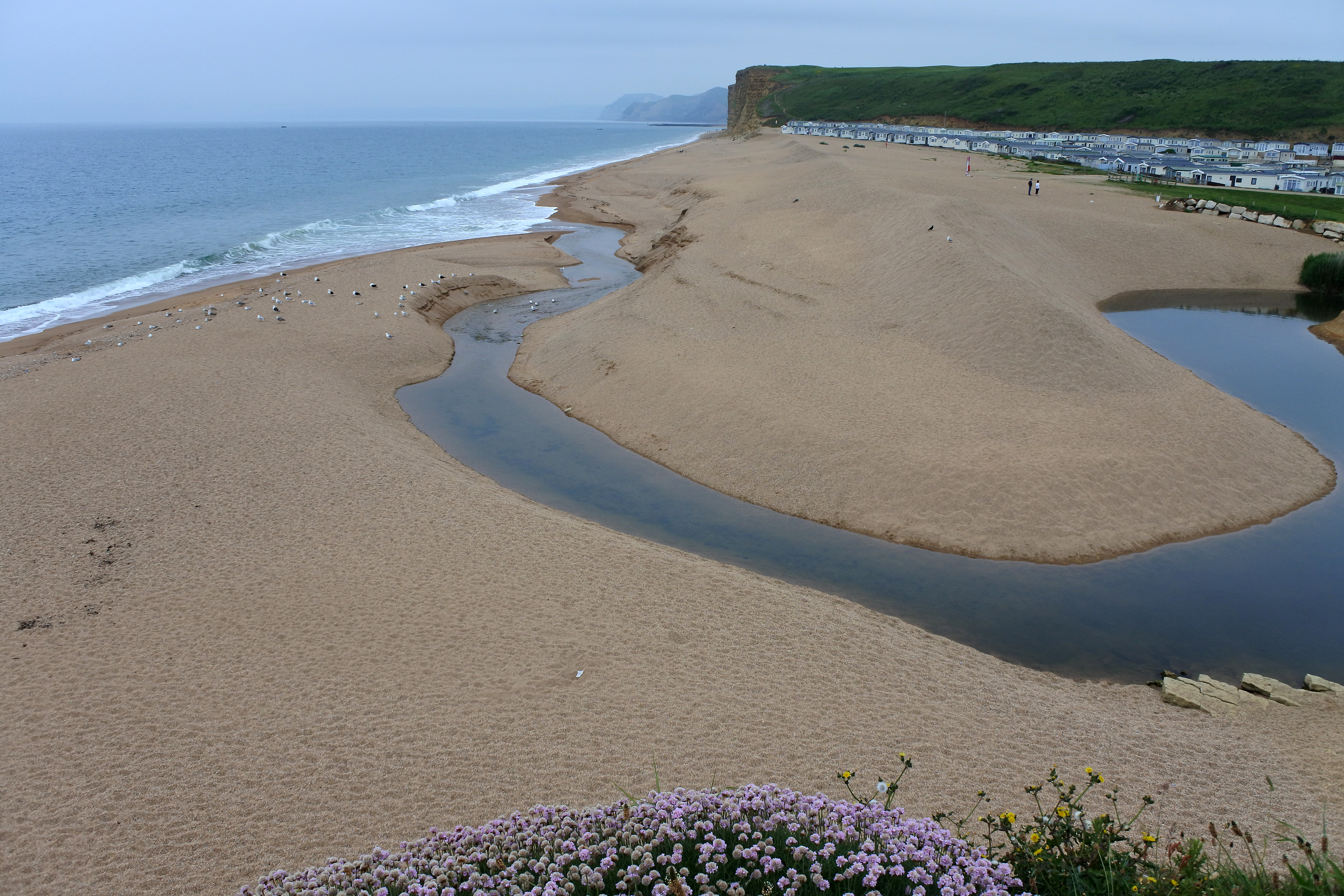
Mouth of the River Bride at Burton Bradstock
