= Thomas Ward (priest) =

Thomas Ward (11 November 1659 – 20 March 1696) was an Anglican priest: the Archdeacon of Wilts from 1687 until his death.

Ward was born in Grendon, Northamptonshire and educated at Magdalen College, Oxford. He graduated B.A. in 1671 and M.A. in 1674. He was Rector of Brightwell-cum-Sotwell, Oxfordshire from 1675 until his death; Chancellor of Salisbury Cathedral from 1681 to 1687; and Treasurer from 1687 until his death.

His uncle was Bishop of Salisbury from 1667 to 1689.
