= Seth Ward (priest) =

Anglican priest

Seth Ward (11 November 1645 – 11 May 1690) was an Anglican priest: the Archdeacon of Wilts from 1675 until 1687.

Ward was born in Buntingford and educated at New College, Oxford. He graduated B.A. in 1671 and M.A. in 1674. He was Rector of Brightwell-cum-Sotwell, Oxfordshire from 1675 until his death; Chancellor of Salisbury Cathedral from 1681 to 1687; and Treasurer from 1687 until his death. He was also a Prebendary of Winchester Cathedral.

His uncle, also called Seth Ward, was Bishop of Salisbury from 1667 to 1689.
