= Thomas Leche =

English archbishop (1581–1646)

Thomas Leche or Leeche (1581–1646) was the Archdeacon of Wilts from 15 November 1614 until his death.

Leche held livings in the Wiltshire parishes of Pewsey (from 1613) and Minety (from 1614).
