= Barney Hopkinson =

British Anglican priest (born 1939)

Barnabas John Hopkinson (born 1939) is an Anglican priest and a former member of the senior leadership team in the Diocese of Salisbury.

He was educated at Emanuel School and Trinity College, Cambridge and ordained in 1965. His first posts were curacies at All Saints and Martyrs, Langley and Great St Mary's, Cambridge after which he was Chaplain at Charterhouse School. After this he was Team Vicar of Preshute then Rural Dean of Marlborough. He was then Rector of Wimborne Minster (1981–1986); Archdeacon of Sarum (1986–1998); and then Archdeacon of Wilts (1998–2004).
