= St Michael and All Angels Church, Littlebredy =

Church in Littlebredy, Dorset, England

Coordinates: 50.6994°N 2.58519°W

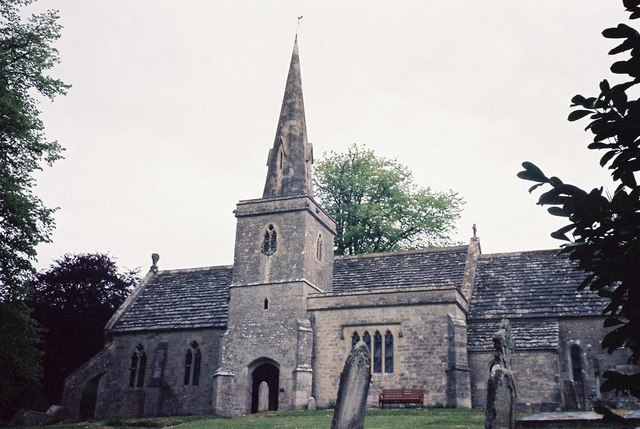
The Church of St. Michael and All Angels in 1996.

St Michael and All Angels Church is a Grade II listed Anglican church in the village of Littlebredy, Dorset, England.

== History ==
The tower dates from the 14th-century, while the rest was rebuilt in 1850 by Benjamin Ferrey when the spire was also added.

== Burials ==
- William Williams MP
- Frederic Wallis

== Gallery ==
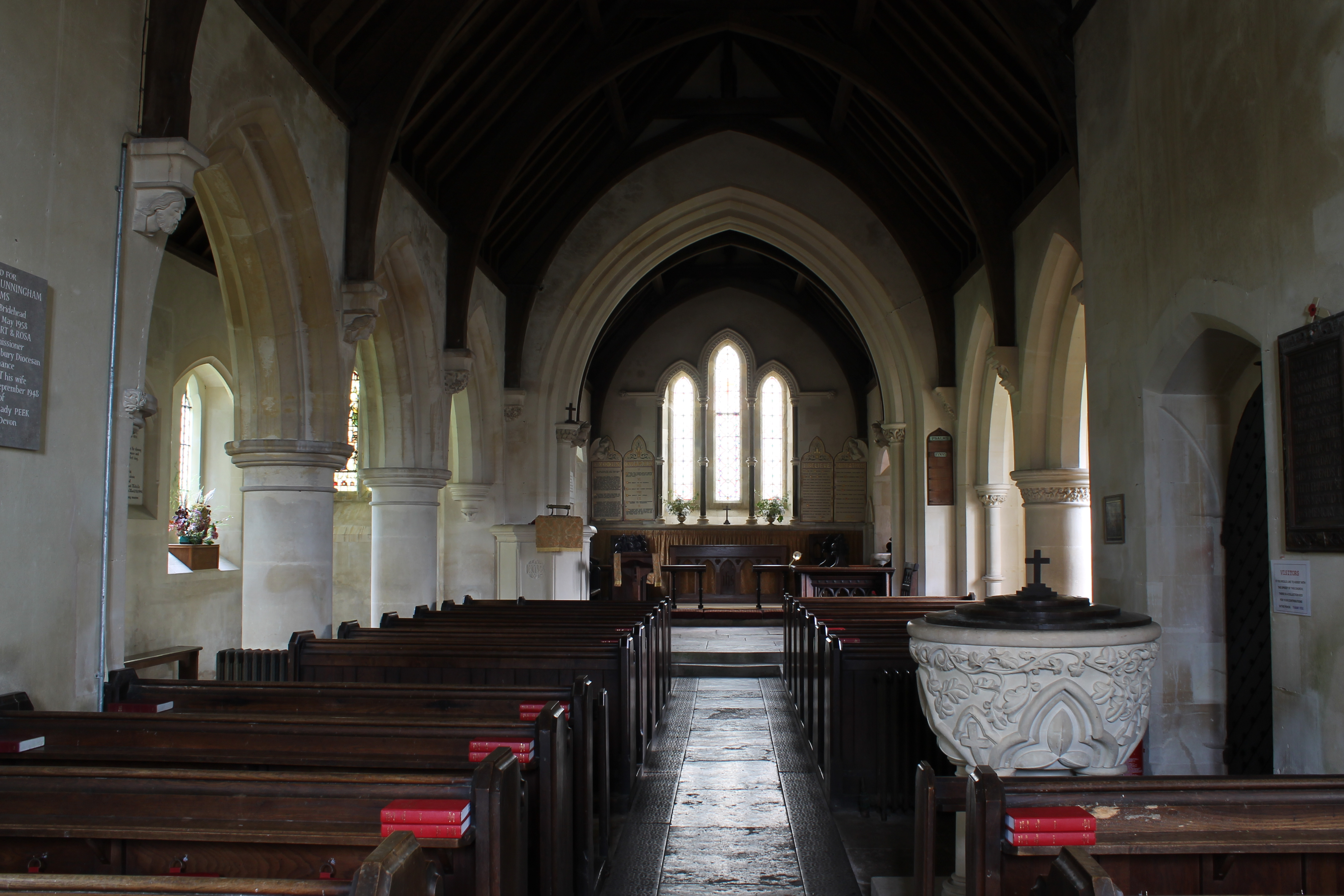
Church interior.

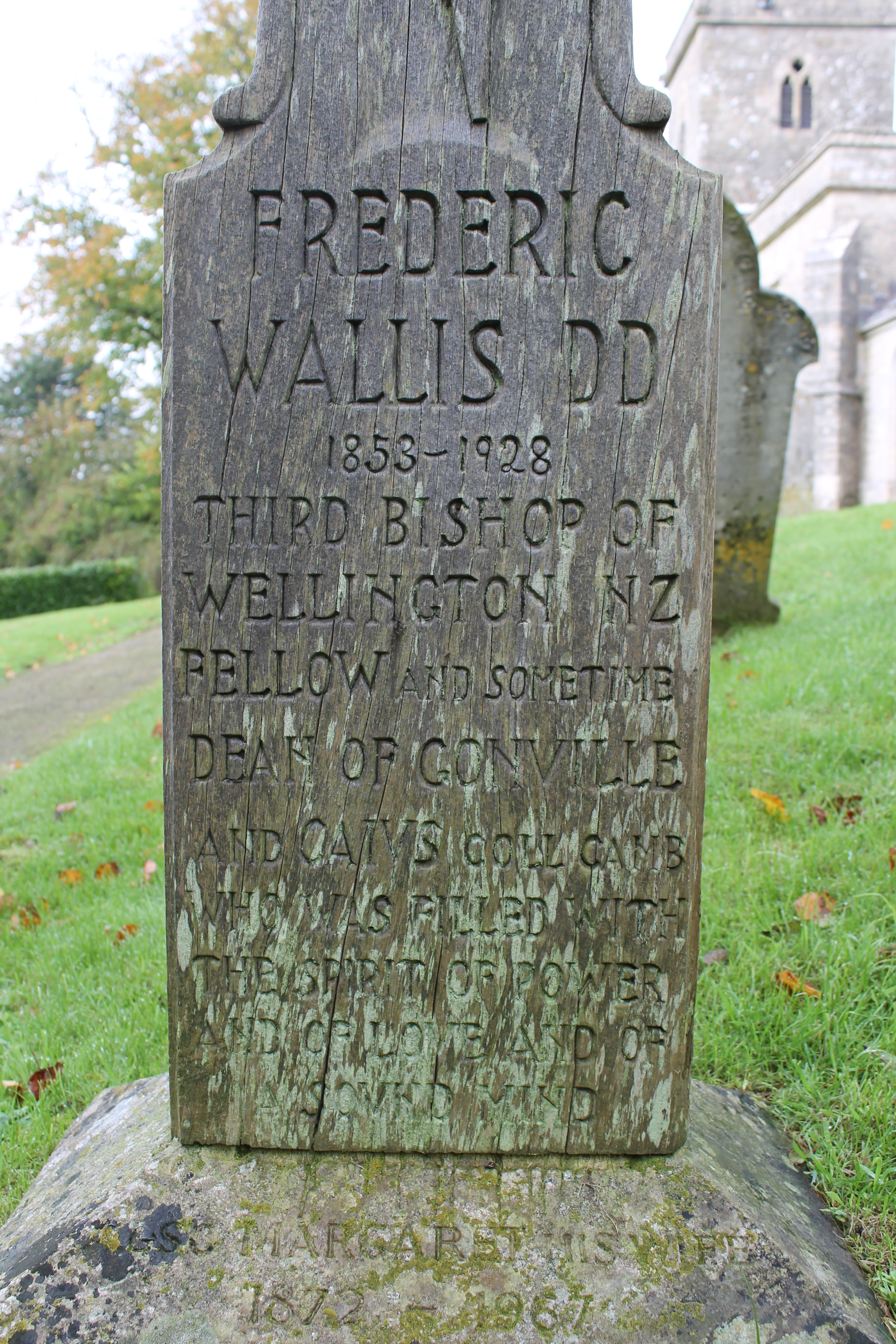
Frederic Wallis memorial.

== See also ==
- List of churches in West Dorset
