= John Lawrence (priest) =

English Anglican priest

John Lawrence was an English Anglican priest in the 16th century.

A Fellow of All Souls College, Oxford, he was Archdeacon of Wilts from 1554 until his deprivation a decade later.
