= Archdeacon of Wilts =

Church of England ecclesiastical office

The Archdeacon of Wilts (or Wiltshire) is a senior cleric in the Diocese of Salisbury, England. The archdeacon is responsible for the disciplinary supervision of the clergy in five deaneries: Marlborough, Pewsey, Calne, Bradford and Devizes.

Louise Ellis has been the Archdeacon of Wilts since 24 May 2025.

== History ==
The first recorded archdeacons in Salisbury diocese occur soon after the Norman Conquest (as they do across England) and there were apparently four archdeacons from the outset. However, no territorial titles are recorded until after c. 1139. The archdeacons at that time were (in order of seniority) the Archdeacons of Dorset, Berkshire, Sarum and Wiltshire. The role is now generally called Archdeacon of Wilts, but both names have been used commonly throughout history.

=== Allocation of parishes to deaneries ===
Many changes were made to the allocation of parishes to deaneries in 1951. The parishes of Charlton, Wilsford and North Newnton were transferred to Wilts from the archdeaconry of Sarum in 1955.

== List of archdeacons ==
=== High Medieval ===
Some archdeacons without territorial titles are recorded from around the time of the Norman Conquest; see Archdeacon of Salisbury.

- bef. 1139–1139: Azo (probably the later Dean of Salisbury)
- bef. 1139–aft. 1157: Roger of Ramsbury
- bef. 1161–1164: Reginald Fitz Jocelin
- bef. 1173–aft. 1173: William
- bef. 1179–aft. 1189: Richard of Wilton
- 1193: Humphrey of Bassingbourn or de Bassingeburn (became Archdeacon of Salisbury)
- 1193–1198 (res.): William of Sainte-Mère-Église (became Bishop of London)
- bef. 1199–aft. 1222: Richard Grosseteste
- bef. 1223–aft. 1223: William de Merston
- bef. 1226–aft. 1246: Stephen of Tisbury
- bef. 1246–1247 (d.): Roger of Buscot
- 1247–aft. 1257: Nicholas of York
- bef. 1258–aft. 1271: Roger de la Grene
- bef. 1275–aft. 1279: Henry Brandeston (became Archdeacon of Dorset)
- bef. 1283–bef. 1284: Ralph of Leicester
- bef. 1284–aft. 1287: Ralph le Waleys of Brightwell
- aft. 1288–aft. 1296: William of Abingdon
- bef. 1299–1303 (d.): Richard de Sotwell

=== Late Medieval ===
- ?–1304 (deprived): Thomas of Savoy
- 25 January 1304–bef. 1320 (d.): William de Chaddleshunt
- bef. 1321–bef. 1326 (d.): Gerald de Tilheto
- 12 March–March 1326 (res.): Iswin de Gandavo
- March 1326 (res.): Robert de Baldock senior
- 27 March 1326 – 1331 (res.): Robert de Ayleston (became Archdeacon of Berkshire)
- 8 August 1331–aft. 1333: Ralph de Querendon
- 10 January 1333 – 30 June 1343 (exch.): John de Whitchurch
- 30 June 1343–bef. 1361 (d.): John Barne
- 26–27 December 1361 (exch.): John Lineden
- 27 December 1361–aft. 1379: John Silvestre or Codeford
- 1388–bef. 1407 (d.): Nicholas Wykeham
- 17 March–21 April 1407 (exch.): William Magot
- 21 April 1407–March 1419: John Chitterne (became Archdeacon of Salisbury)
- 1419–bef. 1423 (d.): John Gaunstede
- 13 October 1423 – 1449 (res.): John Symondesburgh
- 14 August 1449 – 1452 (res.): John Chadworth (became Bishop of Lincoln)
- 8 November 1452–aft. 1454: Marinus Ursinus
- 27 March 1457–bef. 1464 (res.): Vincent Clement
- 10 October 1464 – 1478 (res.): Peter Courtenay (became Bishop of Exeter)
- 1 February 1479–aft. 1485: Hugh Pavy (in commendam as Bishop of St Davids from 1485)
- bef. 1488–bef. 1522 (d.): Christopher Urswick, Dean of York until 1494, Dean of Windsor (1496–1505) and Rector of Hackney from 1502 (also Archdeacon of Richmond (1494–1500), Archdeacon of Norfolk (1500–1522) and Archdeacon of Oxford (from 1504))
- 12 May 1522–bef. 1539 (d.): Edward Finch
- 15 January 1539–bef. 1554 (deprived): John Pollard (deprived) (also Archdeacon of Cornwall from 1543, Archdeacon of Barnstaple from 1544)

=== Early modern ===
- 1554–bef. 1564 (deprived): John Lawrence (deprived)
- 1564–aft. 1577: Giles Lawrence
- 1577–10 March 1590 (d.): John Sprint
- 1590–7 February 1610 (d.): Edmund Lilly, Master of Balliol
- 7 March 1610–bef. 1614 (d.): Walter Benet
- 15 November 1614–bef. 1646 (d.): Thomas Leche
- 1646–1663: vacant (Commonwealth)
- 6 July 1660 – 19 July 1663 (d.): William Creed, Regius Professor of Divinity at Oxford
- 1 August 1663 – 15 December 1674 (d.): Thomas Henchman
- 4 February 1675 – 1681 (res.): Seth Ward
- 15 November 1681 – 1687 (res.): Robert Woodward (later Dean of Salisbury)
- 19 January 1687 – 20 March 1696 (d.): Thomas Ward
- 9 April 1696 – 12 April 1720 (d.): Cornelius Yate
- 26 April 1720 – 1735 (res.): Thomas Rundle (became Bishop of Derry)
- 18 July 1735 – 2 January 1763 (d.): Henry Stebbing
- 20 January 1763–bef. 1768 (res.): Charles Weston
- 22 September 1768–bef. 1779 (d.): Richard Brickenden
- 5 March 1779–February 1799 (d.): Arthur Coham
- 9 March 1799 – 5 May 1804 (res.): William Douglas
- 9 May 1804 – 8 June 1828 (d.): William Coxe
- 14 June 1828 – 24 June 1862 (d.): William Macdonald

=== Late modern ===
- 1862–1863: Henry Drury
- 1863–1868: Charles Harris (became Bishop of Gibraltar)
- 1868–1874: Thomas Stanton
- 1874–1911 (ret.): Thomas Buchanan, Vicar of Potterne until 1891, then Rector of Poulshot, until 1905
- 1911–1912 (res.): Frederic Wallis (previously Bishop of Wellington; later Archdeacon of Sherborne)
- 1912–1927 (res.): Eric Bodington (became Archdeacon of Dorset)
- 1927–1951 (ret.): Joseph Coulter, Vicar of Calne (afterwards archdeacon emeritus)
- 1951–1974 (ret.): Cecil Plaxton, Rector of Pewsey until 1965 (afterwards archdeacon emeritus)
- 1974–1980 (res.): John Neale, Bishop suffragan of Ramsbury
- 1980–1998 (ret.): John Smith, Vicar of Bishops Cannings, All Cannings and Etchilhampton until 1983; Team Vicar, Redhorn from 1990 (afterwards archdeacon emeritus)
- 1998–2004 (ret.): Barney Hopkinson (previously Archdeacon of Sarum)
- 2004–2012 (res.): John Wraw (became area Bishop of Bradwell)
- 2012–2013: Alan Jeans, Archdeacon of Sarum (Acting)
- 28 January 2013 – September 2015: Ruth Worsley
- 22 February 2016 – May 2024 (ret.): Sue Groom
- 24 May 2025 – present: Louise Ellis

== Sources ==
- Greenway, Diana E. (1991), Fasti Ecclesiae Anglicanae 1066–1300, vol. 4, pp. 33–37
- Horn, Joyce M. (1962), Fasti Ecclesiae Anglicanae 1300–1541, vol. 3, pp. 13–14
- Horn, Joyce M. (1986), Fasti Ecclesiae Anglicanae 1541–1857, vol. 6, pp. 18–19
