= Henry Drury (priest) =

English churchman

Henry Drury (11 May 1812 – 25 January 1863) was an English churchman. He became Archdeacon of Wilts, England and Chaplain to the Speaker of the House of Commons.

== Life ==
Drury was the eldest son of Henry Joseph Thomas Drury (1778–1841) and his wife Ann(e) Caroline Tayler, daughter of Archdale Wilson Tayler of Boreham Wood, Hertfordshire. He was born at Harrow, London, in 1812. After passing through Harrow School with distinction he was admitted minor pensioner of Gonville and Caius College, Cambridge, 14 June 1831, and began residence in the following October.

In 1833 he won the Browne medal for the Latin ode, and in 1835 that for the epigrams. An eye complaint prevented further academic successes as an undergraduate. In 1837 he took the ordinary B.A. degree, proceeding M.A. in 1840. In 1838 he became classical lecturer at Caius, but, having been ordained, he left Cambridge in 1839 to take sole charge of Alderley, Gloucestershire, a curacy which he exchanged the following year for that of Bromham, Wiltshire.

Drury, together with some friends, projected and published the Arundines Cami, a collection of translations into Latin and Greek verse by several Cambridge men. The first edition was published in a beautiful form in 1841, and four subsequent editions appeared during Drury's lifetime; a sixth, after his death, was edited by his son-in-law Henry John Hodgson in 1865. These successive editions contained several new pieces.

Drury became rector of Alderley in 1843, and two years later vicar of Bremhill with Foxham and Highway, Wiltshire, a preferment which he received from Dr. Denison, Bishop of Salisbury, to whom, and his successor in the see, Dr. Hamilton, he was examining chaplain. In 1855 he was installed prebendary of Shipton in Salisbury Cathedral, was appointed chaplain to the House of Commons by Mr. Speaker Denison in 1857, and became Archdeacon of Wiltshire in July 1862.

On 13 December 1843 he married Amelia Elizabeth, eldest daughter of the Rev. Giles Daubeny, rector of Lydiard Tregoze, Wiltshire. "After taking holy orders," wrote Mr. H. J. Hodgson, "Mr. Drury proved himself a sound theologian and a valuable assistant to the bishop of his diocese, an earnest preacher, and an active parish priest. … As a friend and companion he was most genial and affectionate, possessed of lively wit and humour, full of anecdote and badinage, but tempered with excellent tact and judgment, all combined with a modesty and absence of self-assertion." H. J. (Henry John) Hodgson was married to Drury's daughter Amy Josephine.

He died at Bremhill in 1863, after two days' illness. His widow survived him by almost 40 years, and died aged 81 at Knightstone, Devon, on 10 December 1902.
