= Potterne =

Coordinates: 51°19′30″N 2°00′32″W

- Village and civil parish
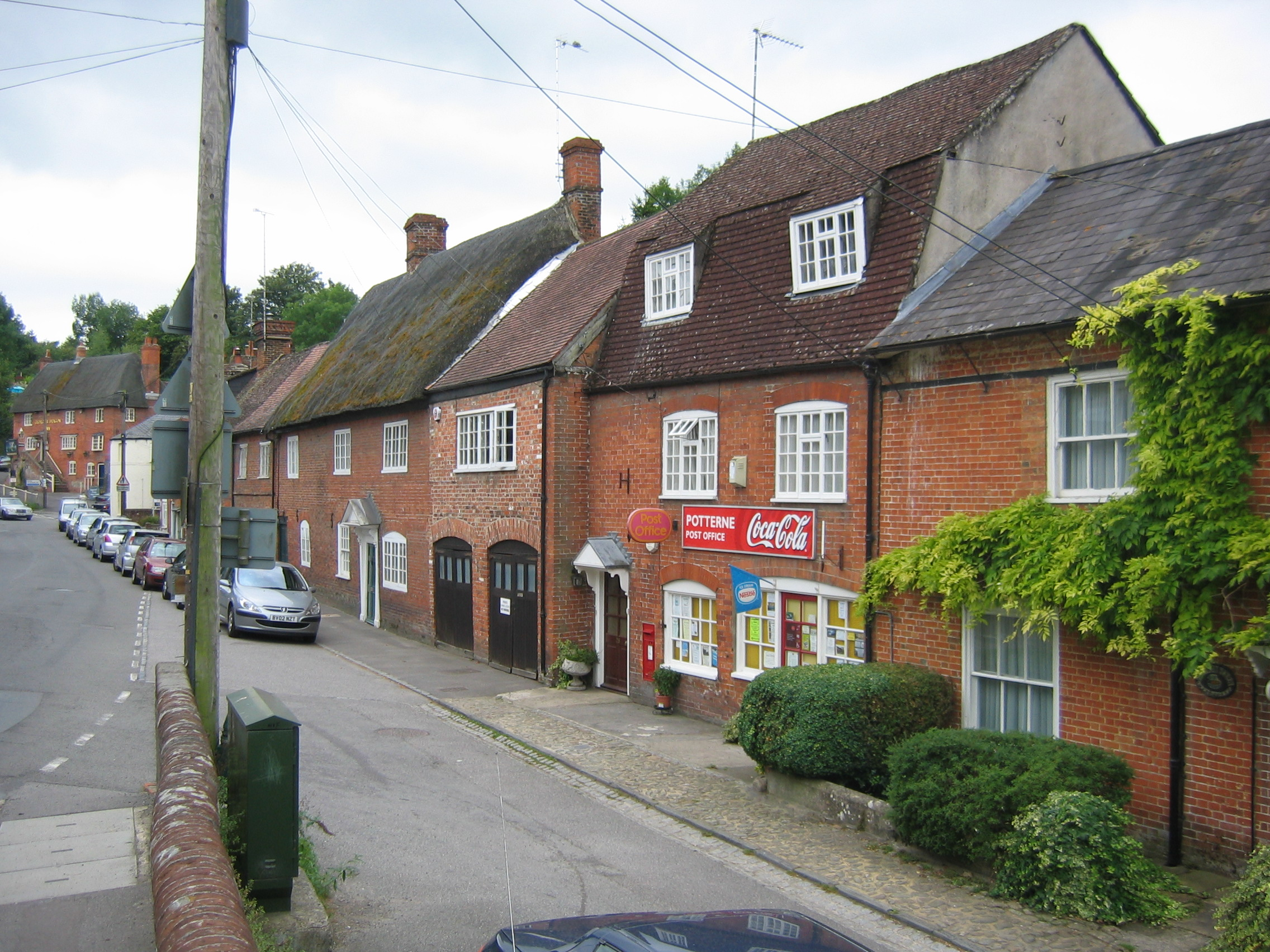
- Village centre

- Location within Wiltshire
- Population: 1,622 (in 2011)
- OS grid reference: ST995584
- Civil parish: Potterne
- Unitary authority: Wiltshire
- Ceremonial county: Wiltshire
- Region: South West
- Country: England
- Sovereign state: United Kingdom
- Post town: DEVIZES
- Postcode district: SN10
- Dialling code: 01380
- Police: Wiltshire
- Fire: Dorset and Wiltshire
- Ambulance: South Western
- UK Parliament: Melksham and Devizes
- Website: Parish Council

Potterne is a village and civil parish in the county of Wiltshire, England. The village is 2 miles (3.2 km) south of Devizes and lies on the A360 which links Devizes to Salisbury. The civil parish includes the hamlet of Potterne Wick.

== History ==
There is evidence of occupation from the Mesolithic era with flint tools, including axe heads, being found from this period. An early Iron Age site, dating to between 700 BCE and 500 BCE, has been found close to Blackberry Lane. Roman remains, including pottery, coins and four skeletons, have been found near Blounts Court.

Domesday Book of 1086 recorded three landholdings at Poterne, with six mills and a large population of 107 households.

The ancient parish consisted of the tithings of Potterne, Worton, and Marston. Worton and Marston were made into a separate ecclesiastical parish in 1852, and two civil parishes in 1894.

== Local government and services ==
The civil parish elects a parish council. It is in the area of Wiltshire Council unitary authority, which is responsible for all significant local government functions.

Dorset and Wiltshire Fire and Rescue Service have their control centre on the outskirts of the village, in the grounds of the manor house. Prior to the amalgamation of the Dorset and Wiltshire services in 2016, the manor house (a late 18th-century building, extended 1888–1889) was the headquarters of Wiltshire Fire and Rescue Service. The house was offered for sale in 2017.

== Parish church ==
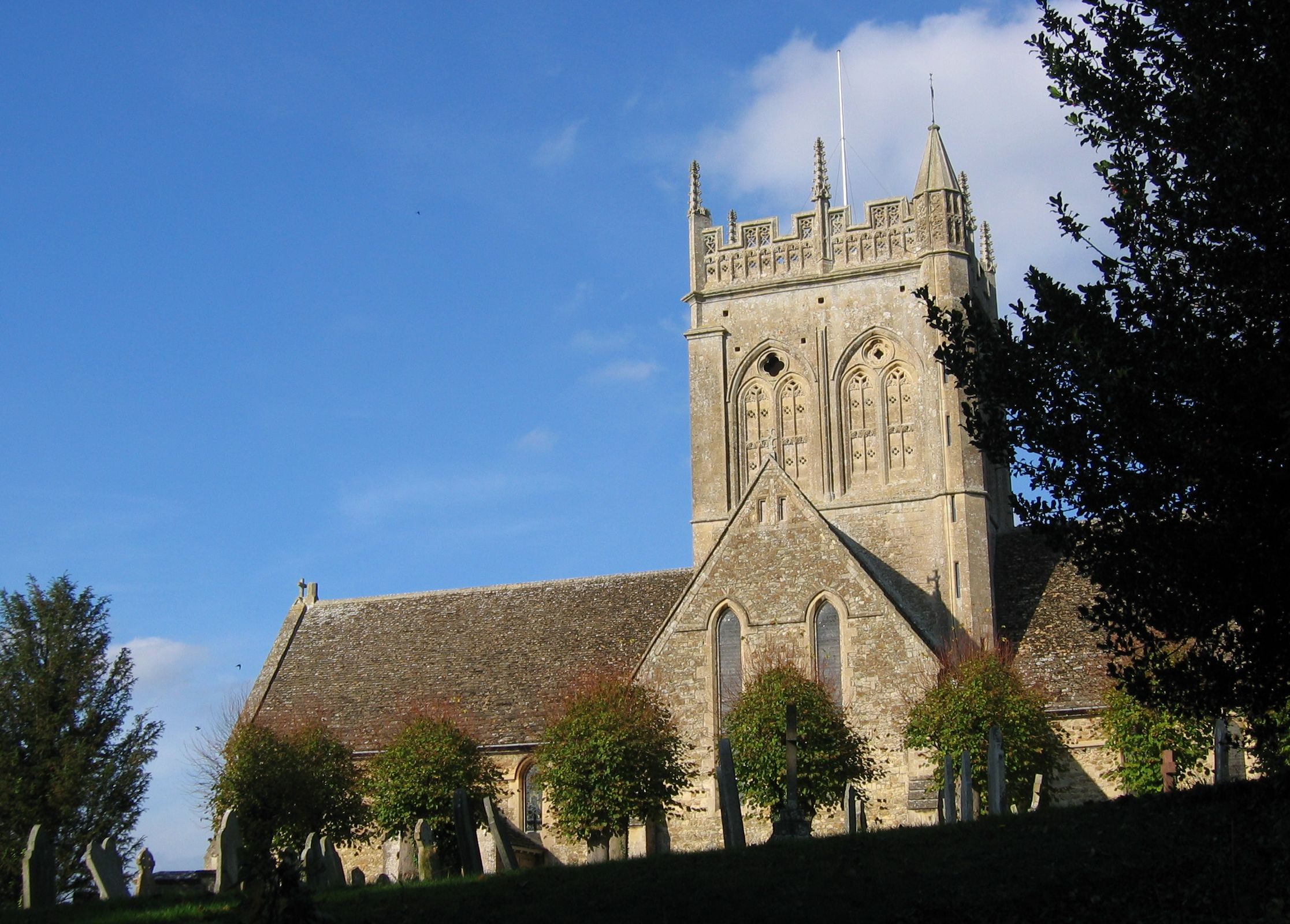
St Mary's Church

A priest, and land held by the Bishop of Salisbury, was recorded at Potterne in Domesday Book of 1086. The Church of England parish church of St Mary was built in the 13th century and has survived with little change, beyond work to the tower in the 15th century and restoration by Ewan Christian. Pevsner describes it as "An Early English parish church of exceptional purity and indeed classicity" and linked this to the Bishops' ownership of the manor.

The church is cruciform, with a substantial tower over the crossing, and original lancet windows. It is built of rubble stone, with ashlar to the upper tower. The south porch was added in the 14th century, and in the 15th the tower was made higher and given an elaborate battlement. Restoration in 1870–2 included re-roofing and the removal of galleries, and the stained glass is from various dates in that century.

The tower has six bells, the oldest cast by William I Purdue c. 1580. The octagonal font and most of the oak pulpit are from the 15th century; A 10th-century font was found during the 1872 restoration and now stands at the west end of the nave. The organ was built in 1723 by Jordan of London and recased in 1938. The church was recorded as Grade I listed in 1962.

Since the 11th century, the church has been linked to All Saints at West Lavington as tithes from both churches endow a prebendary at Salisbury Cathedral. From 1967 the benefice was held in plurality with Worton and since 2017 the parish has been part of the Wellsprings benefice, which extends to Seend, Bulkington and Poulshot.

== Notable buildings ==
- Porch House, a timber-framed house on the High Street, built c.1480. Bought in 1870 by artist George Richmond, who restored it with advice from Ewan Christian. Grade I listed. "Remarkably well preserved" (Pevsner).
- The Red House, c.1700, a two-storey garden building for Walter Grubbe MP at Eastwell House, Grade II*.
- Whistley House, c.1730, a country house northwest of the village, Grade II*.

=== Blount's Court ===
A medieval part of what is now Potterne was the manor of Blount's Court, which probably originated in the 13th century. By 1953, the house and property now known as Blount's Court had been owned by the Stancomb family since 1809, when William Stancomb started building the house, for which he revived the ancient name. His son William died in 1941 at the age of 90. Blount's Court, which is now divided into flats, is a large 19th Century 'gothic' building with a porch carried up as a battlemented tower. The centre block is of three stories, the wings are of two. The windows are squareheaded, mullioned, and transomed, the parapets battlemented. Blount's Court is also the name given to the suburban public street, of about 100 houses, leading up to the private property surrounding the block of flats.

== Amenities ==
The village has a shop with a post office, a village hall, a youth club, a playing field and a park. There is one pub, the George & Dragon.

There is a preschool and a primary school (Five Lanes CE VC Primary School) which has two sites: for younger children at Potterne and for older children in the nearby village of Worton. Wiltshire Scouts have their Wiltshire Scout Centre, with six campgrounds, near Potterne Wick.

Potterne Cricket Club, founded as part of the village sports team in 1936, play in the West of England Premier League and Wiltshire County Cricket League.

=== The Potterne Mummers ===
The village is home to the Potterne Mummers, who re-enact performances of a traditional mummers play during the week before Christmas in pubs around the Devizes area and ending each year with a performance at the George and Dragon and Potterne social club on Christmas Eve. The Mummers were founded in 1953 by Bernard Baker, a local schoolteacher, who brought together a group to perform a local mummer's play which he had found from an archive report from the late nineteenth century. The initial revival of the play only lasted one year; it was performed by Potterne teenagers under the direction of Bernard Baker. In 1976 the cast included Nigel Weeks as Valiant Soldier, and it was next performed in 1972, with a cast which included Mick Hiscock. It has been performed every year since and is a firm annual tradition and the cast, still including Mick Hiscock, put on their tatter coats and tour the pubs collecting money for various charities including the Wiltshire Air Ambulance.

The Potterne Mummers were presented to Prince Philip in 2012 at the Queen's Jubilee event at Salisbury Cathedral and were shortlisted for a Community Service award in 2014.

== Notable people ==
- Nigel Balchin (1908–1970), novelist and screenwriter, born in Potterne
- Eric Bodington, vicar from 1899, later Archdeacon
- Thomas Buchanan, vicar 1871–1891, later Archdeacon
- Edward Byng (c.1676–1753), portrait artist, lived and died in Potterne
- Francis Fox, vicar 1711–1726, controversial theologian
- Walter Medlicott (1879–1970), cricketer, born in Potterne
- Mavis Wheeler (1908-1970), socialite who owned Pilgrim Cottage in Potterne, where she shot her lover Lord Vivian in 1954
- Albert Edward Wilshire (1863–1935), organist and composer, born in Potterne
