= Joseph Coulter (priest) =

Anglican Archdeacon

Joseph William Coulter was an Anglican priest: the Archdeacon of Wilts until 1951.

Born in 1867, he was educated at Trinity College, Dublin. He was ordained in 1897 and began his career with curacies in Ferns and Swanage. He held incumbencies at Langton Matravers, Bridport and Calne.

He died on 10 April 1956.
