= Littlebredy =

Village in Dorset, England

Coordinates: 50.6992°N 2.5828°W

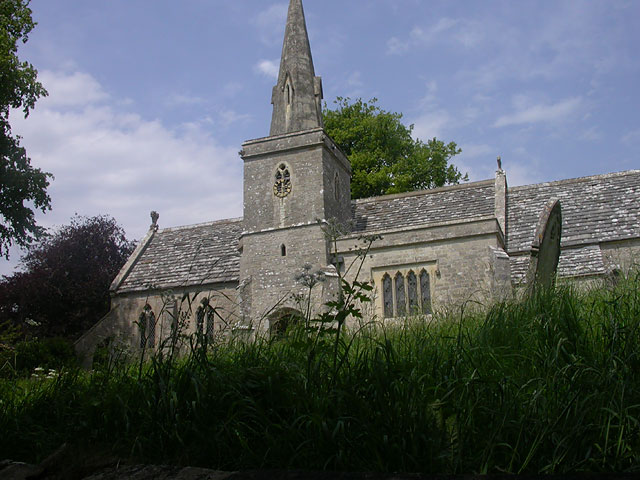
- Parish church of St Michael and All Angels

- Location within Dorset
- Population: 121
- OS grid reference: SY588890
- Unitary authority: Dorset
- Ceremonial county: Dorset
- Region: South West
- Country: England
- Sovereign state: United Kingdom
- Post town: Dorchester
- Postcode district: DT2
- Police: Dorset
- Fire: Dorset and Wiltshire
- Ambulance: South Western
- UK Parliament: West Dorset
- Website: Village website

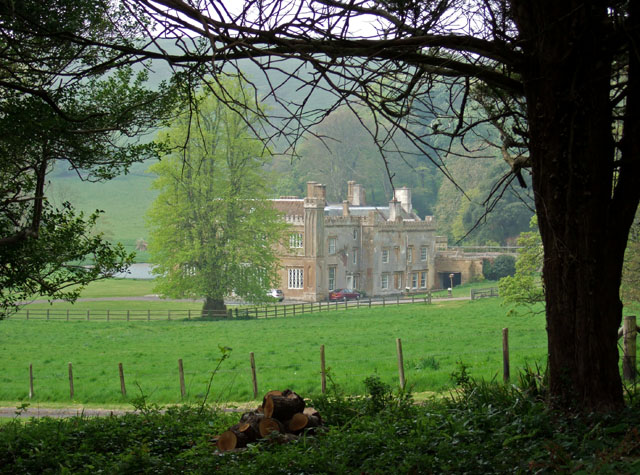
Bridehead House

Littlebredy (also written Little Bredy, pronounced /ˈlɪtəlbrɪdi/) is a small village and civil parish in the English county of Dorset, situated approximately 6.5 miles (10.5 km) west of the county town Dorchester. It is sited at the head of the valley of the small River Bride, surrounded by wooded chalk hills of the Dorset Downs. The parish contains the Valley of Stones National Nature Reserve and is in an area rich with evidence of early human occupation. In the 2011 census it had a population of 121.

== History ==
The area around Littlebredy is rich with evidence of early human occupation, including stone circles, strip lynchets, tumuli (long and round barrows) and a probable hill fort. North and east of the village the density of barrows is as great as the area around Stonehenge. One mile north of the village and just outside the parish is a group of 44 Bronze Age round barrows of various sizes, known as Winterbourne Poor Lot Barrows or just Poor Lot. On a hill immediately south of the village are the earthworks of Old Warren (or Danes' Camp), which most likely was a univallate (single rampart) Iron Age hill fort. Old Warren may later have been used as a burh in the time of Alfred the Great, though it may have been not completed, or abandoned in favour of a site at what is now Bridport.

Records from the 10th century refer to the area as 'Bridian' or 'Brydian' and in 1086 Littlebredy specifically was recorded in the Domesday Book as 'Litelbride'. The words 'Bride' and 'Bredy' derive from the Celtic for a torrential, gushing stream; the addition of 'Little' distinguishes the parish from the larger neighbouring parish of Long Bredy.

Littlebredy was owned by Cerne Abbey until the Dissolution of the Monasteries in the 16th century, when the Abbey sold its land to Philip Vanwilder. The estate subsequently passed to the Freke family of Iwerne Courtney and then Sir Robert Meller (or Mellor) of Winterborne Came, who built Bridehead House in the early 17th century. In 1730 the estate was bought by the Meech family who in 1797 sold it to wealthy banker Robert Williams from Hertfordshire.

During the 19th century the Williams family—headed by four successive Roberts who all became members of parliament—made substantial changes to the estate. The architects Peter Frederick Robinson and then Benjamin Ferrey were employed. Bridehead House was extended and altered by Robinson in 1830–33, then extended further by Ferrey a few years later. The River Bride was dammed near its source to create a lake as part of landscaping around the house. Ferrey also designed new cottages to form an estate village and provided plans for restoring the parish church, including adding a spire to its 14th-century tower. Some Jacobean buildings in the village were also changed around this time, being reworked into a Gothic farmyard or stable block. Ferrey's plan for the church—which involved virtually rebuilding it—was implemented in 1847 under the supervision of the third Robert Williams' brother-in-law, Arthur Acland, who also had an architectural input.

In the churchyard is a memorial to Frederic Wallis, Bishop of Wellington, New Zealand, who married into the Williams family. It is made from the wood of a tree sent specially from New Zealand.

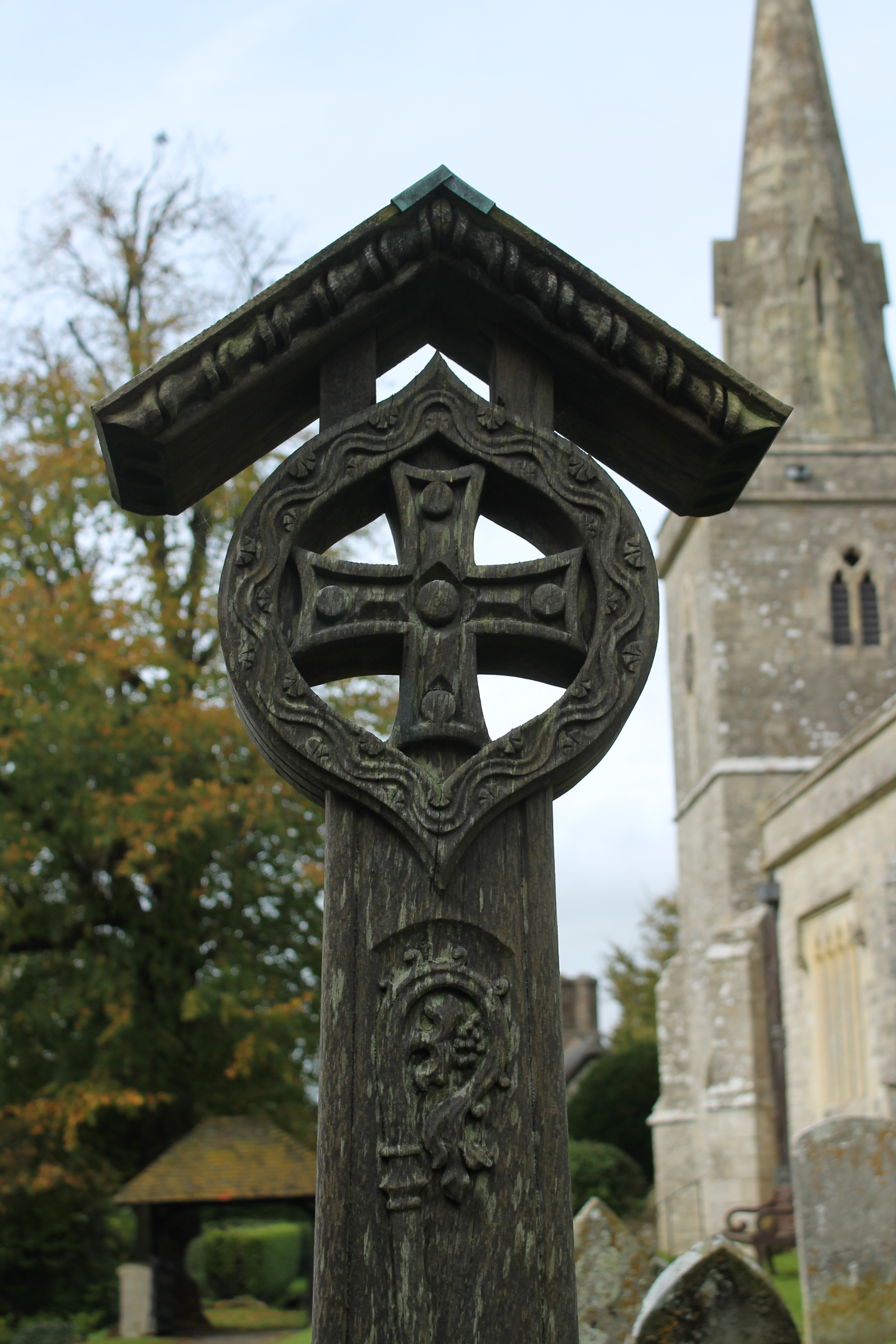
Frederic Wallis memorial in the churchyard of St Michael and All Angels Church (base not shown)

In 2024 the Williams family put the estate, which includes the 32 houses in the village, up for sale. In 2025 it was sold to unknown buyers. The new owners terminated the previous public access to the lake and waterfall on Bridehead Estate. In June 2025 it was reported by the journalist and activist George Monbiot that the new owners had served notice of eviction on the tenants of all the houses in the village. However, the new owners, Belport Limited, stated that they intend to reopen access to the closed area after certain issues are addressed following works, and denied that they plan to evict tenants from properties on the estate. Although Belport have stated and denied that they plan to evict tenants as of July 2026 7 residential homes within the village have been served section 21 eviction notices and have had to leave their homes.

== Government ==
For elections to the British House of Commons, Littlebredy is in the West Dorset parliamentary constituency.

At the upper tier of local government, Littlebredy is the Dorset unitary authority area. For elections to Dorset Council, it is in the Chesil Bank electoral ward.

At the lower tier, Littlebredy is a civil parish. It does not have a parish council, but it does have parish meetings.

== Geography ==
Littlebredy village is sited between 85 and 110 metres above sea-level at the head of the small River Bride, surrounded by wooded chalk hills of the Dorset Downs. It is 6.5 miles (10.5 km) west of the county town Dorchester, 8 miles (13 km) east of Bridport, 8 miles (13 km) northwest of Weymouth and 3.5 miles (5.6 km) north of the English Channel. The nearest railway stations are Maiden Newton, Dorchester West, Dorchester South, Upwey and Weymouth, which are all within a direct radius of 8.5 miles (13.7 km). The nearest main road is the A35 trunk road approximately 1 mile (1.6 km) to the north. All of Littlebredy parish lies within the Dorset National Landscape area.

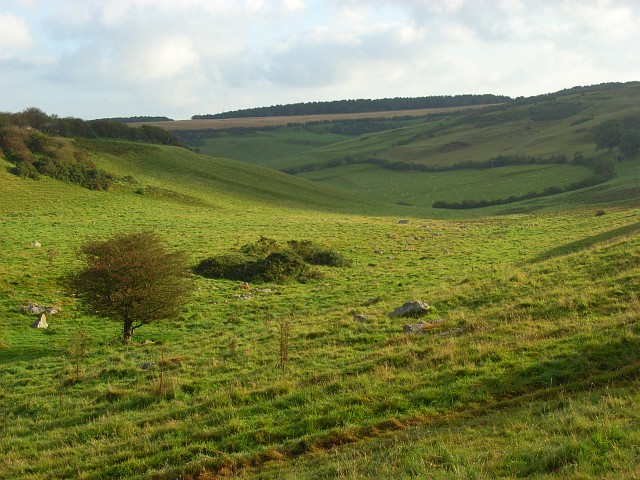
The Valley of Stones

=== Valley of Stones ===
In the south of the parish is the Valley of Stones, which in 1906 was described by Sir Frederick Treves as "a mysterious glen among the downs, on whose grassy slopes many huge stones are scattered." In prehistoric times it was used as a source of building material for nearby constructions such as tombs and stone circles, and within 4 miles are two-thirds of all such structures in the county. Folklore attributes the origin of the stones to have been two giants playing stone-throwing games, but they are the result of conditions at the end of the last ice age, when freezing and thawing caused sandstone on surrounding hilltops to break up and slump downhill. They form one of the best British examples of a sarsen stone boulder train. The stones and the surrounding dry chalk valley provide habitats for a variety of flora and fauna—including clustered bellflower, autumn gentian, lichens, bryophytes and the adonis blue butterfly—and the area is designated a National Nature Reserve.

A stone about 5 feet (1.5 m) in length was found in the Valley of Stones during scrub clearance in 2026. It was found apart from the other scattered stones; Past Participate, the community archaeological company involved in researching the site, has suggested that it was originally part of a Stone Age tomb. It has been brought back into view, and has been named the Bride Stone.

== Demography ==
In the 2011 census Littlebredy civil parish had 53 dwellings, 45 households and a population of 121.

The population of the parish in the censuses between 1921 and 2001 is shown in the table below:

Census Population of Littlebredy Parish 1921–2001 (except 1941)
Census	1921	1931	1951	1961	1971	1981	1991	2001
Population	136	158	132	101	80	80	100	90
Source:Dorset County Council

In the 1861 census the parish had 41 inhabited dwellings and a population of 199.

== Notable people ==
- Robert Meller (c.1564-1624), member of parliament
- Ben Pentreath (born 1971), architect and interior designer
