= Walter Benet =

Walter Benet was the Archdeacon of Wilts from his collation on 7 March 1610 until his death on 30 July 1614.

From Somerset, he was educated at New College, Oxford. He held livings at Little Wittenham and Minety.
