= Charles Weston (priest) =

English Anglican cleric

Charles Weston (1731–1801) was an Anglican cleric, the Archdeacon of Wilts from 1763 until 1768.

Weston was born in London and educated at Christ Church, Oxford. He graduated B.A. in 1772 and M.A. in 1775. He was ordained deacon on 25 September 1755 and priest on 14 March 1776. He was the Rector of Therfield from 1762 until his death; and a prebendary of St Paul's Cathedral from 1763 until his death.
