= Frederic Wallis =

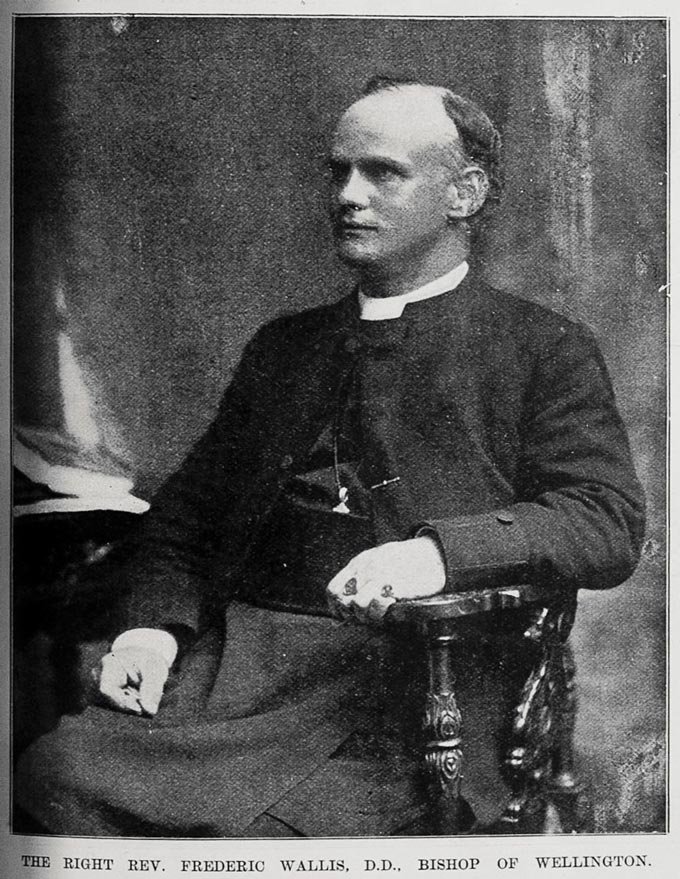
Frederic Wallis, Bishop of Wellington, 1908

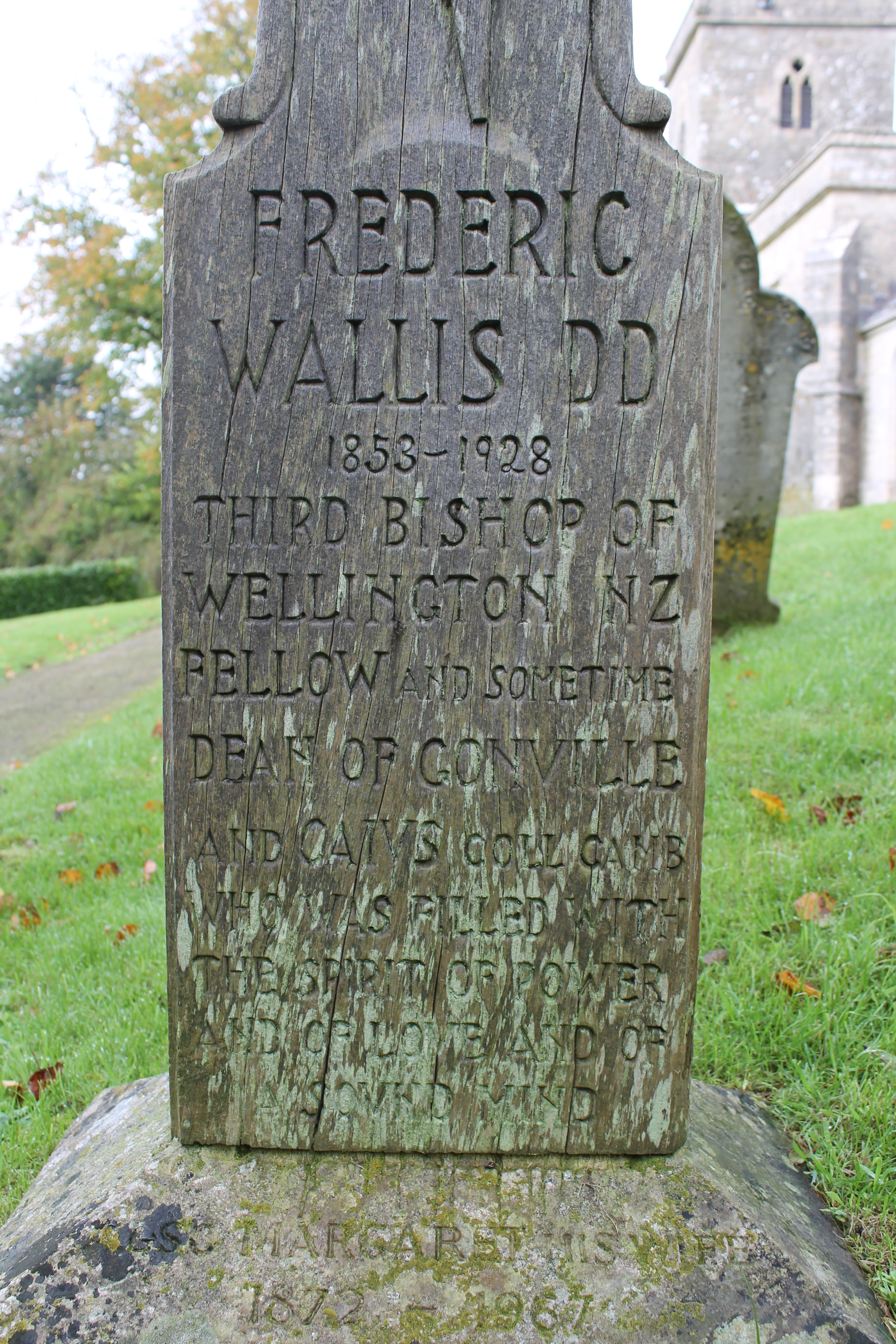
Frederic Wallis memorial, St Michael and All Angels Church, Littlebredy

Frederic Wallis (1854 – 24 June 1928) was an Anglican priest.

== Biography ==
Frederic Wallis was born in Hastings, the son of Joseph Wallis, MA. He was educated at St Paul's and Gonville and Caius College, Cambridge (whence he gained his MA Cantab). Ordained in 1876, he became Dean of Caius in 1878 and a Lecturer in Divinity Lecturer at Cambridge. In 1895 he was appointed to the colonial episcopate as Bishop of Wellington, a post he held for 16 years before retirement in 1911. On his return to the UK, he was Archdeacon of Wilts (1911–1912), a Canon at Salisbury Cathedral (1913 onwards) and Archdeacon of Sherborne (1916–1919). Having become a Doctor of Divinity (DD), he died in Bournemouth, and is buried at Littlebredy.

== Legacy ==
A memorial labyrinth named in honor of Wallis and his wife Margaret is located at Hutt Hospital in Wellington, New Zealand.

Church of England titles
| Preceded by Octavius Hadfield | Bishop of Wellington; 1895–1911 | Succeeded by Thomas Sprott |
