= John Neale (bishop) =

Bishop of Ramsbury (1926–2020)

The Right Reverend John Neale
- Bishop of Ramsbury
- Diocese: Diocese of Salisbury
- In office: 1974–1988
- Successor: Peter Vaughan
- Other posts: Honorary assistant bishop in Bristol (1991–2020); in Gloucester (1996–2004); and in Bath & Wells (1991–2008); Area bishop of Ramsbury (1981–1988); Archdeacon of Wilts (1974–1980)

Orders
- Ordination: 1955 (deacon); 1956 (priest)
- Consecration: 24 January 1974

Personal details
- Born: 21 September 1926
- Died: 17 July 2020 (aged 93)
- Denomination: Anglican
- Parents: Geoffrey & Stella Wild
- Profession: Writer; army officer
- Education: King's College London

John Robert Geoffrey Neale AKC (21 September 1926 – 17 July 2020) was a British Anglican bishop. From 1974 to 1988, he was the first suffragan Bishop of Ramsbury in the Church of England and the first area bishop under that diocese's 1981–2009 area scheme.

Neale was educated at Felsted School and then served in the Royal Artillery during World War II. He completed his studies at King's College London and St Boniface's Warminster, then began his ordained ministry as a curate in St Helier. He was made a deacon on Trinity Sunday 1955 (5 June) and ordained a priest the following Trinity Sunday (27 May 1956) – both times by Bertram Simpson, Bishop of Southwark, at Southwark Cathedral. He was then, successively, the chaplain of Ardingly College, Secretary of the Advisory Council for Church Ministry, Canon Missioner for the Diocese of Guildford and Rector of St Peter's Hascombe before his consecration to the episcopate on 24 January 1974 by Michael Ramsey, Archbishop of Canterbury, at Westminster Abbey. From October that year until 1980, he also served as Archdeacon of Wilts in the same diocese. From 1991 he was an assistant bishop in the Diocese of Bristol, having moved into Corsham, Wiltshire as well as, simultaneously, in the Diocese of Gloucester from 1994.

He died in July 2020, at the age of 93. His papers are housed at the National Church Institutions Database of Manuscripts and Archives.

Church of England titles
New title	Bishop of Ramsbury; 1974–1988	Succeeded by Peter Vaughan
