= Poulshot =

Coordinates: 51.338°N 2.044°W

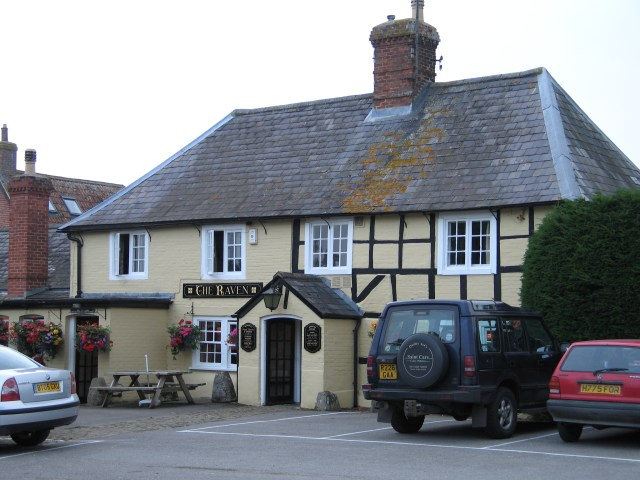
- The Raven, Poulshot

- Location within Wiltshire
- Population: 370 (in 2011)
- OS grid reference: ST970599
- Unitary authority: Wiltshire
- Ceremonial county: Wiltshire
- Region: South West
- Country: England
- Sovereign state: United Kingdom
- Post town: DEVIZES
- Postcode district: SN10
- Dialling code: 01380
- Police: Wiltshire
- Fire: Dorset and Wiltshire
- Ambulance: South Western
- UK Parliament: Melksham and Devizes
- Website: Parish Council

Poulshot (pronounced Pole-shot) is a village and civil parish in Wiltshire, England. Its nearest town is Devizes, about 2.5 miles (4 km) to the northeast. The parish includes the hamlet of Townsend.

The A361 Trowbridge-Devizes road forms part of the northern boundary of the parish, while most of the western boundary is the Summerham Brook, a tributary of the Semington Brook.

== History ==
The Domesday survey of 1086 recorded around 70 households in the area, a relatively large number, although it is not possible to identify which settlements this number refers to. By 1242, the overlord of the manor was John FitzAlan, who was lord of Keevil manor. The Wiltshire Victoria County History traces the later owners, including Sir John Lovel (1341–1408), Gifford Long (c.1576–1635) and the Long family of Rood Ashton. The landowner in 1953 was Viscount Long of Wraxall.

Manor Farmhouse, south of the village green, is a 17th-century timber-framed house which was re-fronted in brick in the early 18th century. Church Farmhouse also began as a timber-framed house and was re-cased in roughcast in the early 19th century.

In the 17th century, John Aubrey wrote in his Natural History of Wiltshire:

At Poulshot, a village neer the Devises, in the spring time the inhabitants appeare of a primrose complexion; 'tis a wet, dirty place.

== Religious sites ==
=== Parish church ===
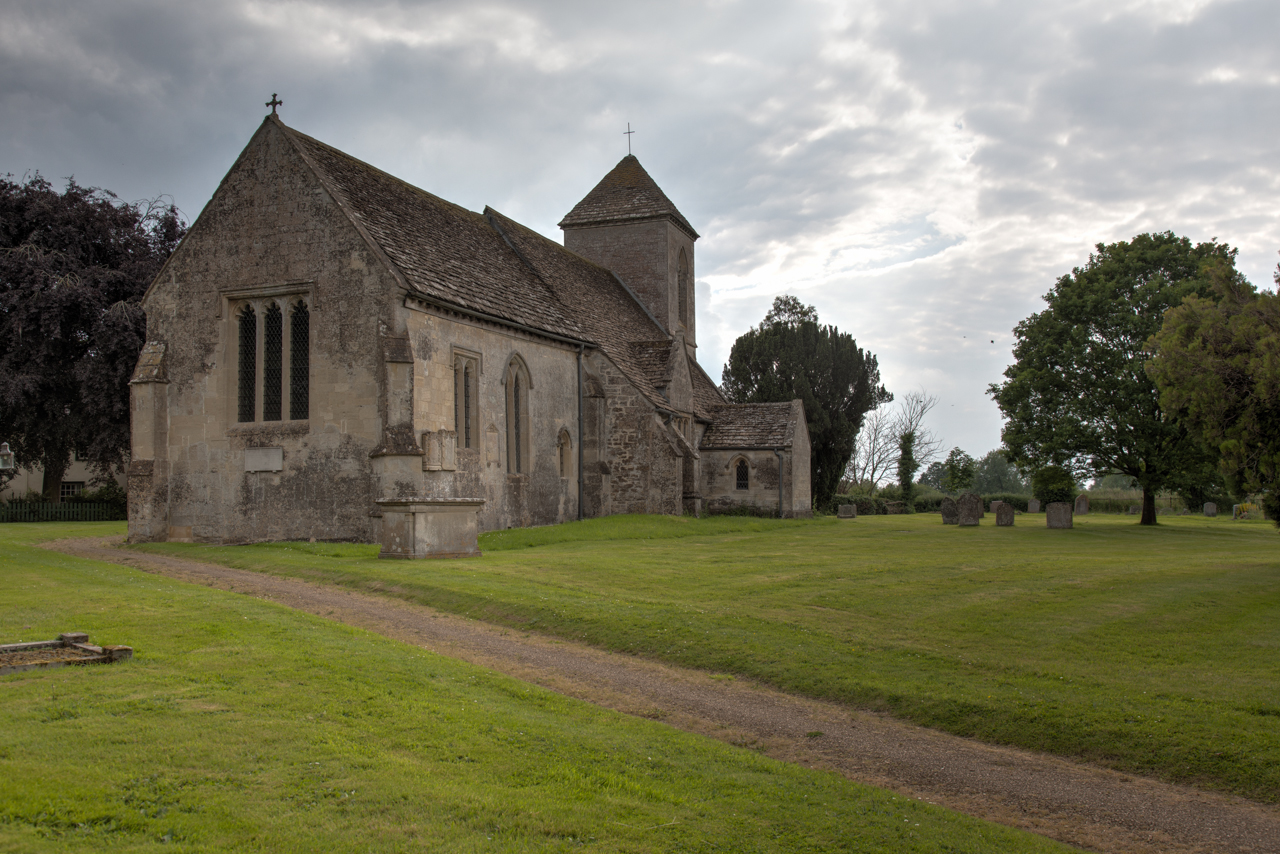
St Peter's church

The Anglican church of St Peter is 0.6 miles (1 km) southwest of the village green, at Townsend. There is a record of a church in 1207, one of several which had been given to Bec Abbey, Normandy and were exchanged for others under the Bishop of Salisbury.

The nave of the present church dates from the late 13th century. Nikolaus Pevsner observed that the narrowness of the 14th-century aisles implies that they retain the layout of an earlier building. Set into the walls of the north and south aisles are scalloped 12th-century capitals. The south window of the chancel has rare pieces of grisaille glass from c.1300. The south porch is from c.1400. Alterations in the 15th century included new windows, although the chancel retains two small lancets of the late 13th century. The chancel was extended in the 16th century, making it longer than the nave.

The narrow west tower with pyramidal roof was erected in 1853 by the rector, William Fisher, in memory of his wife who had died the previous year. It carries three bells – two of them cast by John Wallis in 1606 – which had previously hung in a wooden bell turret. At present they are unringable.

The church escaped Victorian restoration, but was repaired in 1898; the vestry was added in that century. In 1916, the church was badly damaged in a fire which destroyed the nave roof and the furnishings; repairs were not complete until 1925. The oak pulpit is a copy of the 17th-century original which was lost in the fire. In 1962 the church was designated as Grade II* listed.

The benefice was united with that of Worton in 1931, with the incumbent to live at Worton and the parsonage house at Poulshot to be sold; but the two parishes remained distinct. The union was severed in 1967, and today the parish is part of the Wellsprings benefice, a group of five neighbouring parishes.

=== Others ===
A half-timbered chapel of ease dedicated to St Paul was built in 1897, in a more accessible position in the centre of the village next to the rectory. The initiative was instigated by Archdeacon Buchanan, who provided the land. From 1929 the building became a church hall; it is no longer in use.

A Wesleyan Methodist chapel was built in 1886, to designs by C.E. Ponting, north of the Raven Inn. It is now a private home.

== Notable people ==
Isaac Walton, son of the author Izaak Walton, was rector of Poulshot from 1680 until his death in 1719. Other distinguished rectors of Poulshot include Thomas Rundle (c. 1688–1743), who became bishop of Derry; Benjamin Blayney (1728–1801), scholar of Hebrew; and Thomas Buchanan, who was rector from 1891 to 1905 and at the same time Archdeacon of Wilts.

William Fisher was rector from 1823 until his death in 1874. His eldest son Herbert (1826–1903) was a historian.

In 1775 Thomas Boulter, the village miller, was sentenced to 14 years transportation for theft. His son (also named Thomas), tried to run the mill but gave it up and became an infamous highwayman, committing many robberies in an area stretching from the south coast as far north as Cheshire and as far west as Bristol, before being hanged at Winchester on 19 August 1778. It is said that for many years afterwards, fierce guard dogs in the area were generally called "Boulter" after him.

== Amenities ==
Poulshot has a pub, the Raven. The Kennet and Avon Canal passes through the northwest corner of the parish and the Caen Hill flight of locks is nearby.

There is no school in the parish. A National School was built in the village in 1884 and closed in 1974; the building became the village hall.
