= Hounsell =

Hounsell is a surname. Notable people with the surname include:

- Alan Hounsell (born 1947), New Zealand cricketer
- Barbara Hounsell (born 1951), Canadian swimmer
- Colin Hounsell (born 1955), Australian footballer
- Elizabeth Hounsell (1950–2020), British academic and carbohydrate chemist
- Patrick Hounsell (born 1958), New Zealand cricketer
- William Hounsell (1820–1903), English cricketer

== See also ==
- David A. Hounshell (born 1950), academic historian
