= St Peter's Church, Eype =

Church in Dorset, England

St Peter's Church
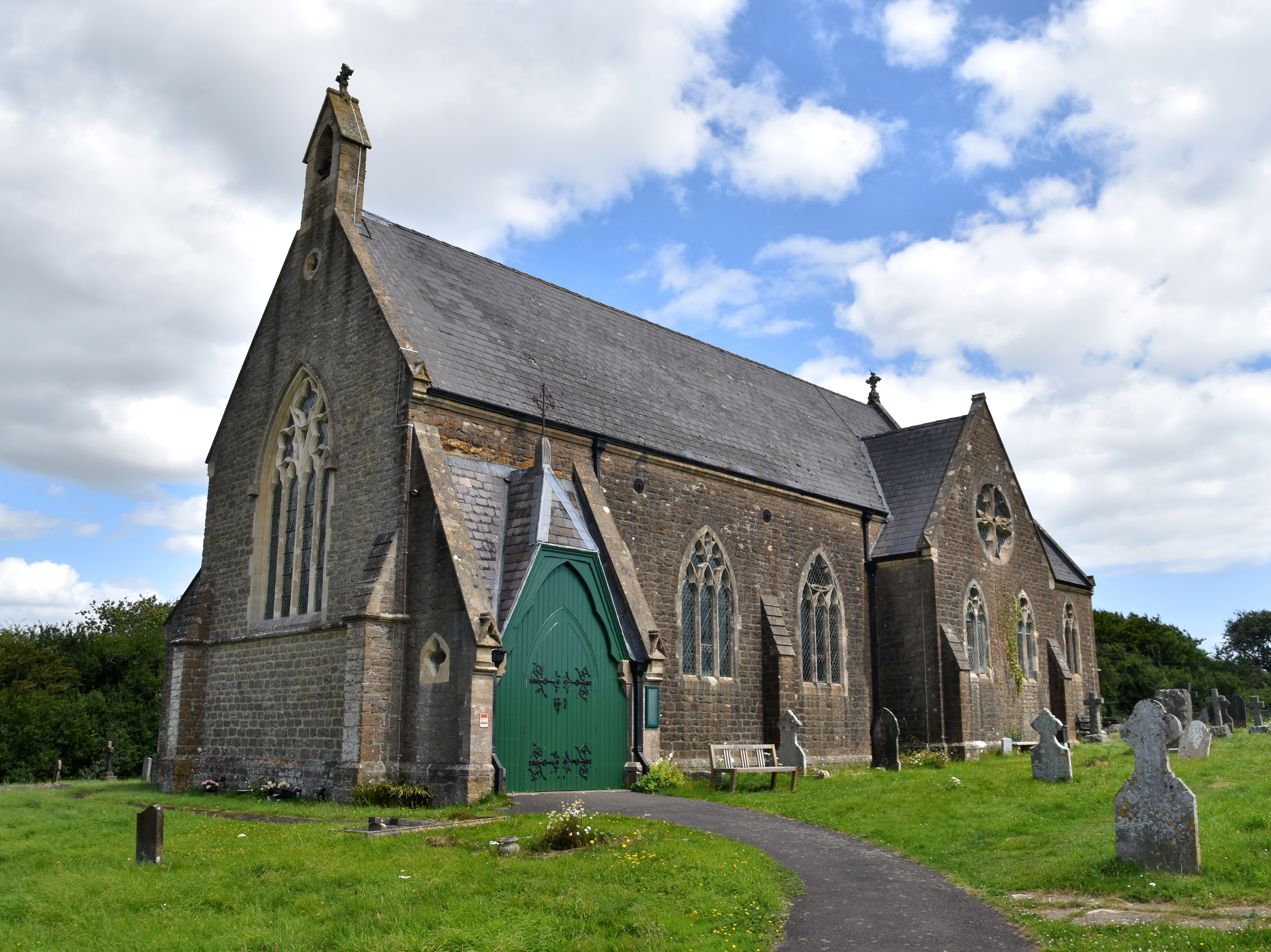
- St Peter's Church

Religion
- Affiliation: Church of England
- Ecclesiastical or organizational status: Active
- Year consecrated: 1865

Location
- Location: Eype, Dorset, England
- Interactive map of St Peter's Church
- Coordinates: 50.7230°N 2.7788°W

Architecture
- Architect: Talbot Bury
- Type: Church

St Peter's Church is a Church of England church in Eype, Dorset, England. Built in 1864–65, the church now also serves as an arts venue, known as the Eype Centre for the Arts.

== History ==
St Peter's was built as a chapel of ease to St. John the Baptist at Symondsbury, with £3,000 of its cost having been bequeathed by the rector, Rev. Gregory Raymond, who died in 1863. His successor, Rev. Henry Rawlinson, continued efforts to build a church at Eype. A plot of land on a hilltop above Eype was donated by Mr. Syndercombe Bower, which allowed the church to also serve the inhabitants Watton and part of Bridport Harbour.

The foundation stone was laid on 28 May 1864 by the Bishop of Salisbury, Walter Kerr Hamilton. Plans for the church were drawn up by the architect Talbot Bury of London who supervised its construction. The builder was Mr. George Swaffield of Shipton Gorge, with all carpentry and woodwork carried out by Mr. George G. Hayward of Burton Bradstock. Mr. W. K. Brown of Bridport undertook plumbing, painting and decorative work. The completed church was consecrated by the Bishop of Salisbury on 24 August 1865.

== Eype Centre for the Arts ==
In the face of a declining congregation, work was carried out at the church in 2002–03 to give it an additional role as an arts venue and it opened in 2003 as the Eype Centre for the Arts. The project was the idea of Rev. Dr. Ray Shorthouse, who believed the new dual role of the church would secure its long-term future. The £250,000 alteration cost was sourced from the local Walbridge Trust and the church is now regularly used to hold concerts, exhibitions and other events.

In 2010, the church was used by PJ Harvey for the recording of her eighth studio album Let England Shake. She told Bridport News: "I remembered that the man who now runs this church as an arts venue had said to me a few times if I'd ever wanted to use it for a show or rehearsals that he'd love that, and that's when I approached him and asked if we could use it."

== Architecture ==
St Peter's was built of local stone from Symondsbury and Bothenhampton, with its windows, doors and arches dressed in Bath stone. The Decorated Gothic church was designed to accommodate 300 persons and built with a cruciform plan, containing a nave, chancel, sacristy, north and south transepts and a south porch. A tower was intended for the church, however limited funds prompted the construction of a bell turret on the western end of the roof instead.
