= George Biles =

George Biles (1 July 1900 – 7 December 1987) was a British sign painter and lettering artist who worked in Bridport, Dorset, in South West England. Biles ran a signpainting business in Bridport from 1924 to a few days before his death aged 87, and painted a large number of pub signs, murals, theatre backcloths, charters and other work.

Painted signs are a long-standing tradition of British pubs, but whereas most pub sign painters are poorly documented or anonymous, Biles' work received considerable attention by the end of his very long career, with a profile on television news, in a book on pubs and in German media. (Note: All older articles cited in this article as of 2025 are those displayed in the exhibition curated by Thompson.) After his death, one of his main clients, the Bridport brewery Palmers, preserved 65 of his signs in storage and his friend and fellow signpainter Ken Allen saved the contents of his studio, meaning that his career is well documented.

== Life and career ==
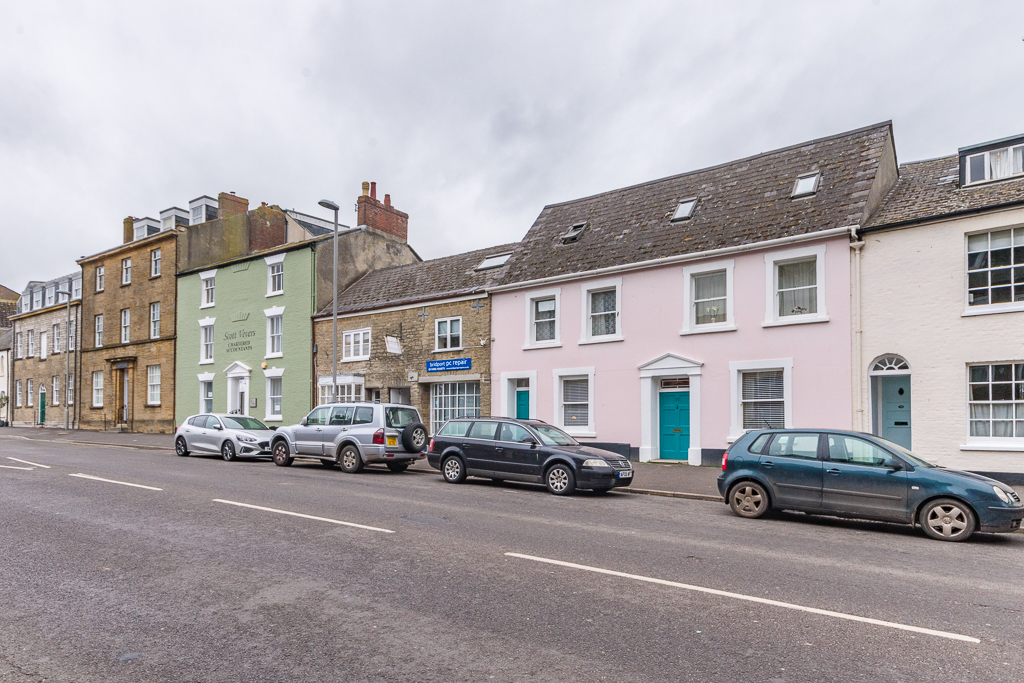
Biles' business was based at 71 East Street, Bridport (building at centre of photograph in yellow stone)

Born Frederick George Allison Biles, Biles grew up in Allington, Dorset and began an apprenticeship to a local sign writer aged 14 before setting up his own business, first called Cast and Biles and later Signs Service Studios, in East Street, Bridport. He preferred to paint on marine plywood. He conducted research into historically appropriate details and clothing for his signs, such as finding an old photograph of a monument before it was moved. Whipple and Anderson, who profiled him in a book on pubs, commented that he used "a delicate, subdued style...his signs often contain subtle ocean blues and carefully executed grey or cloudy skies". When painting a two-sided pub sign he painted a different design on each side. Also surviving from his work are theatre wall murals in the Bridport Electric Palace theatre and backcloths for local theatre and pantomime performances. A 1932 profile covering his Electric Palace murals commented that he used "pastoral scenes painted in pastel shades". By the end of his career he was nicknamed "The Professor".

As Biles and his wife Hilda May Kirk (m. 1926) did not have children and Hilda predeceased him, his studio contents were assigned by his executors to friend Ken Allen after his death, who preserved them. One of his main clients, Palmers Brewery, preserved many of his signs done for its pubs, such as when pubs closed. A first full exhibition on Biles' work took place in Bridport Arts Centre, Bridport Museum and other local venues in August 2024. The exhibition was curated by painter Jemma Thompson, who studied with one of Biles' apprentices.
