= Pearkes =

Pearkes is both a given name and surname. Notable people with the name include:

- George Pearkes (1888–1984), Canadian politician and soldier
- Pearkes Gundry (1837–1891), English cricketer
