= Eype =

Village in Dorset, England

Coordinates: 50.7218°N 2.7823°W

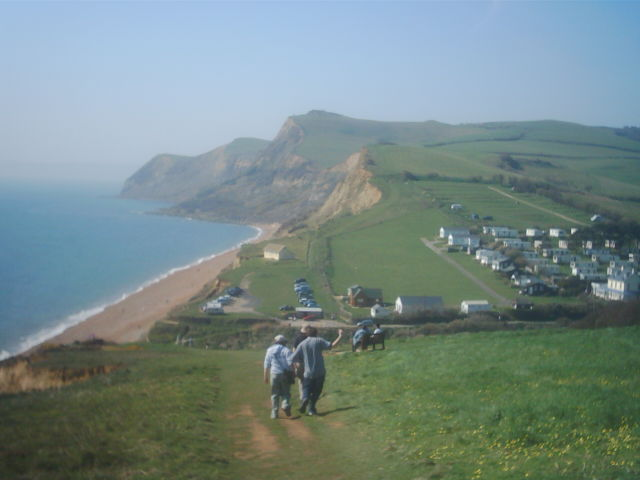
- Looking west from Eype Mouth

- Location within Dorset
- OS grid reference: SY449917
- Unitary authority: Dorset
- Ceremonial county: Dorset
- Region: South West
- Country: England
- Sovereign state: United Kingdom
- Postcode district: DT6
- Dialling code: 01308
- Police: Dorset
- Fire: Dorset and Wiltshire
- Ambulance: South Western
- UK Parliament: West Dorset

Eype ( /iːp/ EEP) is a small village in southwest Dorset, England, situated 1 1/4 miles (2 km) southwest of Bridport. It lies on the Jurassic Coast World Heritage Site on the English Channel and is within the civil parish of Symondsbury.

Eype means "steep place". Many of the village buildings can be traced back to the late eighteenth or early nineteenth centuries, but little is known in detail until the Victorian era.

To the west of Eype Beach is Golden Cap, the highest cliff on the south coast of England at 191 m (627 ft) above sea level. In 2011 a beach hut at Eype Beach went on the market for £200,000.

A notable resident was the antiques dealer Paul Atterbury.

St Peter's Church is regularly used for art exhibitions, known as Eype Centre for the Arts and was also used to record P.J. Harvey's Mercury prize-winning Let England Shake

The village contains Eype's Mouth Country Hotel, The New Inn (operated by Palmers Brewery), Eype Beach Holiday Park and Highlands End Holiday Park.
