= Bridport =

Town in Dorset, England

Coordinates: 50.7336°N 2.7584°W

- Town, civil parish
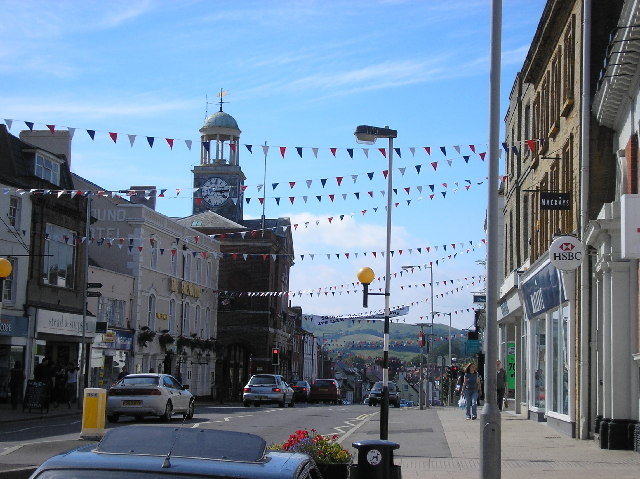
- East Street and Bridport Town Hall

- Coat of arms of Bridport

- Location within Dorset
- Interactive map showing the parish boundary
- Population: 12,295 (2021 census)
- OS grid reference: SY464925
- Unitary authority: Dorset
- Ceremonial county: Dorset
- Region: South West
- Country: England
- Sovereign state: United Kingdom
- Post town: Bridport
- Postcode district: DT6
- Dialling code: 01308
- Police: Dorset
- Fire: Dorset and Wiltshire
- Ambulance: South Western
- UK Parliament: West Dorset
- Website: bridport-tc.gov.uk

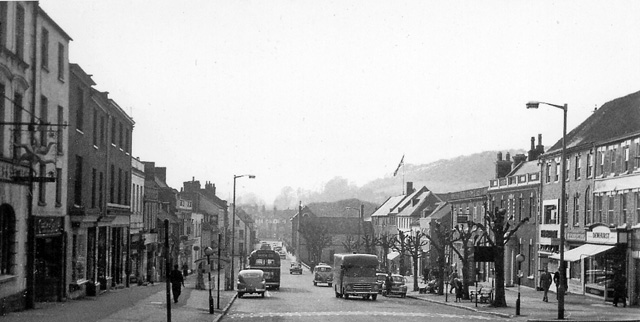
West Street in 1960; Bridport's wide main street is a result of the town's history as a rope-making centre

Bridport is a market town and civil parish in Dorset, England, 1 1/2 miles (2.4 km) inland from the English Channel near the confluence of the River Brit and its tributary the Asker. Its origins are Saxon and it has a long history as a rope-making centre. On the coast and within the town's boundary is West Bay, a small fishing harbour also known as Bridport Harbour.

The town features as Port Bredy in Thomas Hardy's Wessex novels. In the 21st century, Bridport's arts scene has expanded with an arts centre, theatre, cinema and museum.

At the 2021 census, the Bridport built-up area had a population of 12,295. The town is twinned with Saint-Vaast-la-Hougue, France.

== History ==
Bridport's origins are Saxon. During the reign of King Alfred it became one of the four most important settlements in Dorset – the other three being Dorchester, Shaftesbury and Wareham – with the construction of fortifications and establishment of a mint.

Bridport's name probably derives from another location nearby. In the early 10th century the Burghal Hidage recorded the existence of a fortified centre or burh in this area, called 'Brydian', which is generally accepted as referring to Bridport. 'Brydian' means 'place at the (River) Bride', and this name may have come from an earlier burh in the Bride Valley a few miles to the east, which perhaps was abandoned or not completed in favour of the harbour site at Bridport. A probable location for an earlier burh is at Littlebredy. In 1086 the Domesday Book recorded that the town was called 'Brideport'; 'port' is Old English for a market town, thus 'Brideport' may have described the market town belonging to or associated with Bredy. At a later date, in a reversal of a more typical derivation, the town lent its name to the river on which it stood; previously this had been the River Wooth, but it became the River Brit.

The Domesday Book recorded that Bridport had 120 houses in the reign of Edward the Confessor (1042–1066). In 1253 the town was awarded its first charter by Henry III, and by the subsequent reign of Edward I Bridport sent two members to Parliament. In the 14th and 15th centuries, like other Dorset coastal towns, Bridport suffered heavy losses due to frequent outbreaks of the Black Death; one 14th-century account by Geoffrey Baker recorded that the disease "almost stripped the seaports of Dorset of their inhabitants". Around this time the town was also subjected to attacks by raiding French and Spanish forces.

Since the Middle Ages Bridport has been associated with the production of rope and nets. The earliest official record of this industry dates from 1211, when King John ordered that Bridport make "as many ropes for ships both large and small and as many cables as you can". The raw materials needed, flax and hemp, used to be grown in the surrounding countryside, though they were superseded in modern times by artificial fibres such as nylon. Bridport's main street is particularly wide due to it previously having been used to dry the ropes, after they had been spun in long gardens behind the houses. Ropes for gallows used to be made in the town, hence the phrase "stabbed with a Bridport dagger" being used to describe a hanging.

In the English Civil War (1642–1651) the population of Bridport mainly supported the royalists. At the end of the war in 1651 Charles II briefly stayed in the town at The George Inn as he sought to escape Parliamentarian forces after his defeat at the Battle of Worcester. Local loyalty to the king again played a part in the first action in the Duke of Monmouth's Rebellion when on 16 June 1685, 40 cavalry and 400 foot soldiers, commanded for Monmouth, moved on from Lyme Regis to Bridport, where they encountered 1,200 men from the local royalist Dorset militia. The skirmish ended with retreat of the rebel force, although many of the militiamen deserted and joined Monmouth's army.

Many buildings in Bridport, particularly in the main street, date from the 18th century. Bridport Town Hall was built in 1785–6, with its clock tower and cupola added about twenty years later. Older buildings can be found in South Street, and include the 13th-century St. Mary's parish church, the 14th-century chantry and the 16th-century Bridport Museum.

The population of Bridport in 1841 was 4,787. During the 19th century Bridport's population grew little, unlike many Dorset towns, although many sturdy buildings were constructed at this time, showing that at least parts of the population remained prosperous. In 1857 the Bridport Railway was opened, which joined the town with the existing national rail network. This benefitted the town's textile industry and brought cheaper goods such as coal to the area. In 1884 the line was extended from Bridport's station to a new terminus on the coast at Bridport Harbour, which was renamed West Bay as part of attempts to promote it as a resort. The West Bay extension closed to passengers in 1930 and all traffic in 1962. The entire Bridport line closed in 1975.

The town gave its name to Bridport, Vermont and Bridport, Tasmania.

== Governance ==
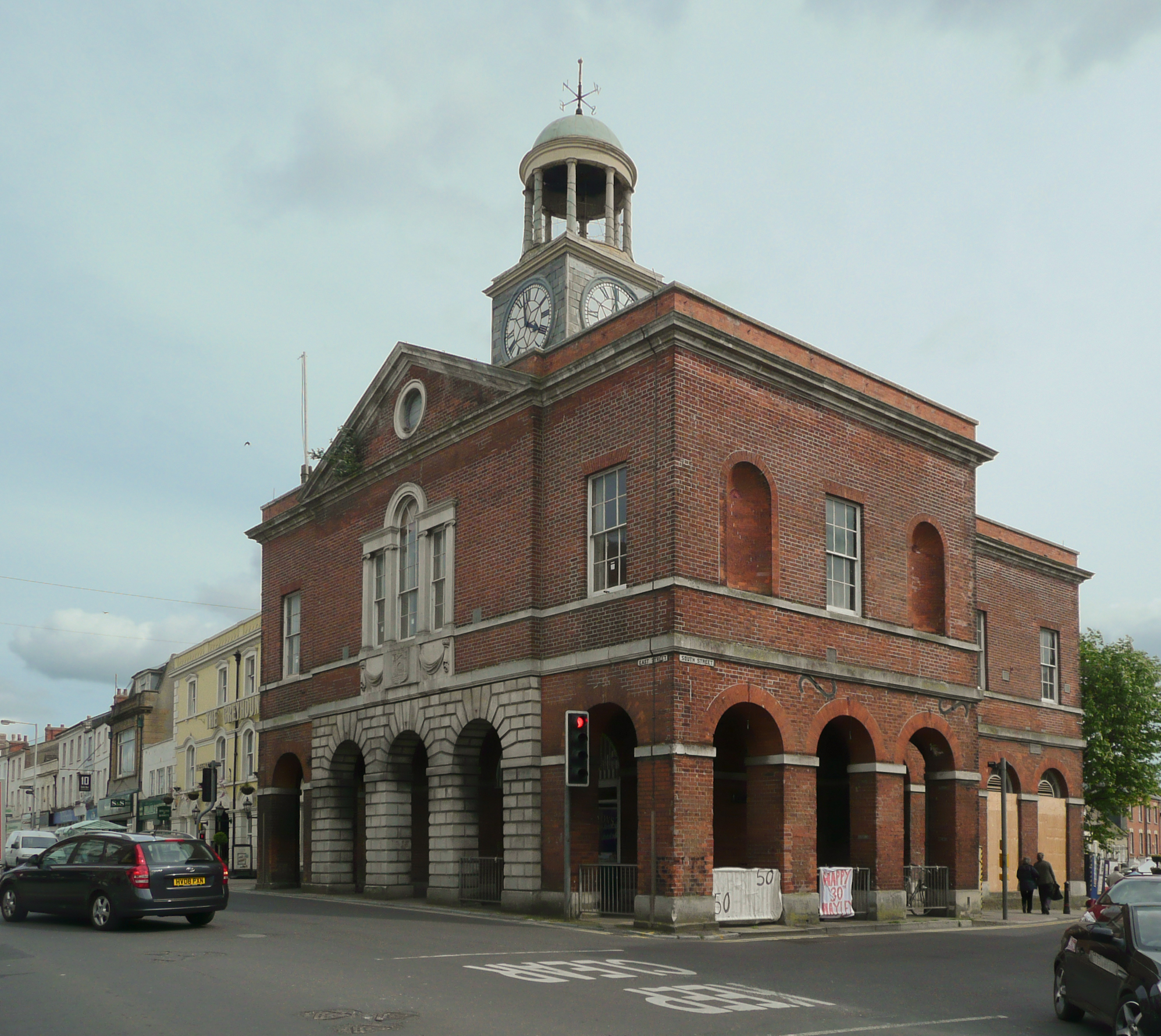
Bridport Town Hall (1786) by William Tyler

In the UK national parliament, Bridport is within the West Dorset constituency. As of 2024, the Member of Parliament (MP) is Edward Morello of the Liberal Democrats.

Bridport has two-tiers of local government. At the lower level, Bridport is a civil parish governed by a town council of 20 members elected from 5 wards representing neighbourhoods of the town. At the upper level, Bridport is part of Dorset unitary authority. Bridport electoral ward (which also includes neighbouring Symondsbury) elects 3 of the 82 members to Dorset Council.

In 1835 Bridport became a municipal borough, the district contained only the parish of Bridport from 1894. in 1974 the district and parish were abolished and it became part of West Dorset district. A successor parish was formed covering the same area as the former district and its parish. In 2019 Bridport became part of Dorset unitary authority area. The rural hinterland around the town formed Bridport Rural District from 1894 to 1974. (Note: See List of rural districts formed in England and Wales 1894–1974)

On 1 April 2024 the parishes of Bothenhampton and Allington were abolished and merged with Bridport, part of Allington also went to Symondsbury.

== Geography ==
Bridport is in the county of Dorset in South West England. Measured directly, it is about 14 miles (23 km) west of the county town Dorchester, 15 1/2 miles (25 km) SSW of Yeovil in Somerset, 33 miles (53 km) east of Exeter in Devon and 1 1/2 miles (2.4 km) inland from the English Channel at West Bay. The town centre is sited between the small River Brit and its tributary the Asker, about 800 yards (730 m) north of their confluence, at an altitude of 10–15 metres (33–49 ft). Another small tributary, the River Simene, also joins the Brit to the west of the town centre.

Bridport contains several neighbourhoods, some of which used to be separate villages. These include Allington, Skilling, Coneygar, Bothenhampton, Bradpole, Court Orchard and St Andrew's Well. South of the town centre and within the town's boundary is West Bay, a small fishing harbour known as Bridport Harbour until the arrival of the railway.

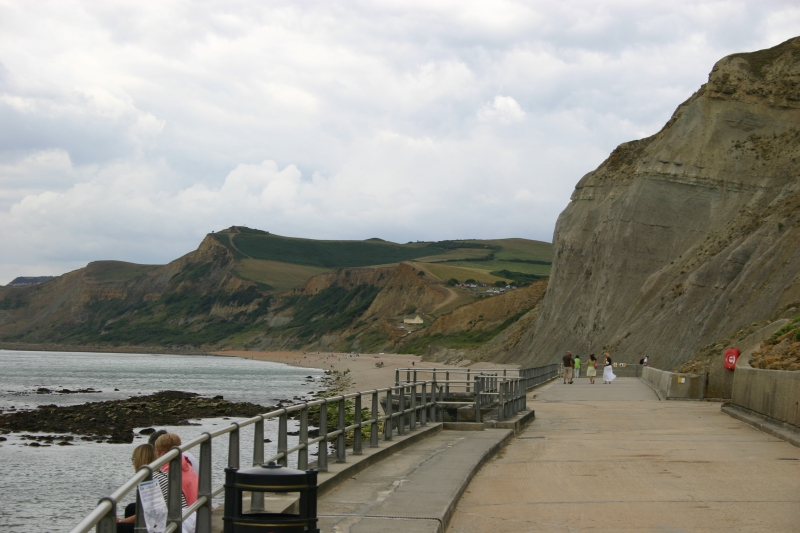
The Jurassic cliffs, West Bay

The geology of Bridport comprises rocks formed in the Pliensbachian, Toarcian, Aalenian, Bajocian, Bathonian and Callovian ages of the Jurassic period, overlain by superficial Quaternary deposits of alluvium alongside the rivers. There are several faults in the area, including the Mangerton Fault, which is aligned SSW-NNE and runs from West Bay up the valleys of the River Brit and Mangerton River. This intersects with several E-W faults, including three in the lower Brit Valley, between Bothenhampton and West Bay, that run east, and two, north of the town centre, that run west. The land beneath the town centre and to the west and southwest (around the neighbourhood of Skilling) is mostly Eype Clay, a micaceous mudstone, though slightly younger Down Cliff Sand crowns the hill at Watton Cross. The hills immediately north of the town are formed from Bridport Sand, with Allington Hill and Watton Hill having small caps of Inferior Oolite. North of the hills, moving away from the town's built-up area, undifferentiated Down Cliff Sand and Thorncombe Sand is separated from the Bridport Sand of the hills in most places by a band of Beacon Limestone. The hills east of the town, around Walditch and Loders, are also mostly of Bridport Sand capped by Inferior Oolite, with the Beacon Limestone outcropping near their base and the undifferentiated sands closer to the town. To the south east however, the faults running east from the lower Brit Valley are associated with a change to slightly younger material, mostly calcareous mudstones and sandstones (Fuller's Earth, Frome Clay and Forest Marble), with small outcrops of Cornbrash limestone and Kellaways Formation to the south of Bothenhampton parish church.

The coast at Bridport is part of the Jurassic Coast, a World Heritage Site that covers a continuous 96 miles (154 km) of coastline in Dorset and neighbouring east Devon. Chesil beach starts at Portland and ends at West Bay. The east pier of West Bay is at the east end of Chesil beach. All of the town is also within the Dorset National Landscape area, a protected landscape designation of national significance. The town's most notable landmark is the conical Colmer's Hill, its distinctive shape and small clump of summit trees being very noticeable from West Street.

Bridport is a Met Office coastal weather observation point.

== Demography ==
At the 2021 census, Bridport civil parish as it was then defined had a population of 8,205 people in 4,175 households. The Office for National Statistics also define a Bridport "built-up area" which includes parts of the three other parishes that in 2024 were merged into Bridport parish; this area had a population of 12,295 in 2021.

Census population of Bridport and its predecessor civil parishes
Census	Bridport	Allington	Bothenhampton	Bradpole	Sources
1801	3,117	716	334	575	
1811	3,567	941	344	789	
1821	3,742	1,139	385	926	
1831	4,242	1,300	424	1,018	
1841	4,787	1,545	533	1,357	
1851	4,653	1,748	548	1,391	
1861					
1871					
1881	3,936	1,709	536	1,567	
1891	3,768	1,771	490	1,641	
1901 (Note: Bridport parish had been enlarged by 495 acres in 1894.)	5,710	253	449	805	
1911	5,919	254	481	524	
1921	5,909	233	502	581	
1931	5,917	228	564	696	
1951	6,272	525	813	870	
1961 (Note: Bridport parish had been enlarged by 75 acres between the 1951 and 1961 censuses.)	6,530	249	943	1,230	
1971	6,370	210	1,310	1,410	
1981	6,880	430	1,660	1,610	
1991	7,290	640	1,770	1,990	
2001	7,743	614	2,186	2,270	
2011	8,332	766	2,131	2,339	
2021	8,205	926	2,100	2,322	

According to council tax records, in 2014 the proportion of homes within Bridport's built-up area that were second homes was 4.8%. The figure for Bridport parish alone was 5.6%.

== Economy ==
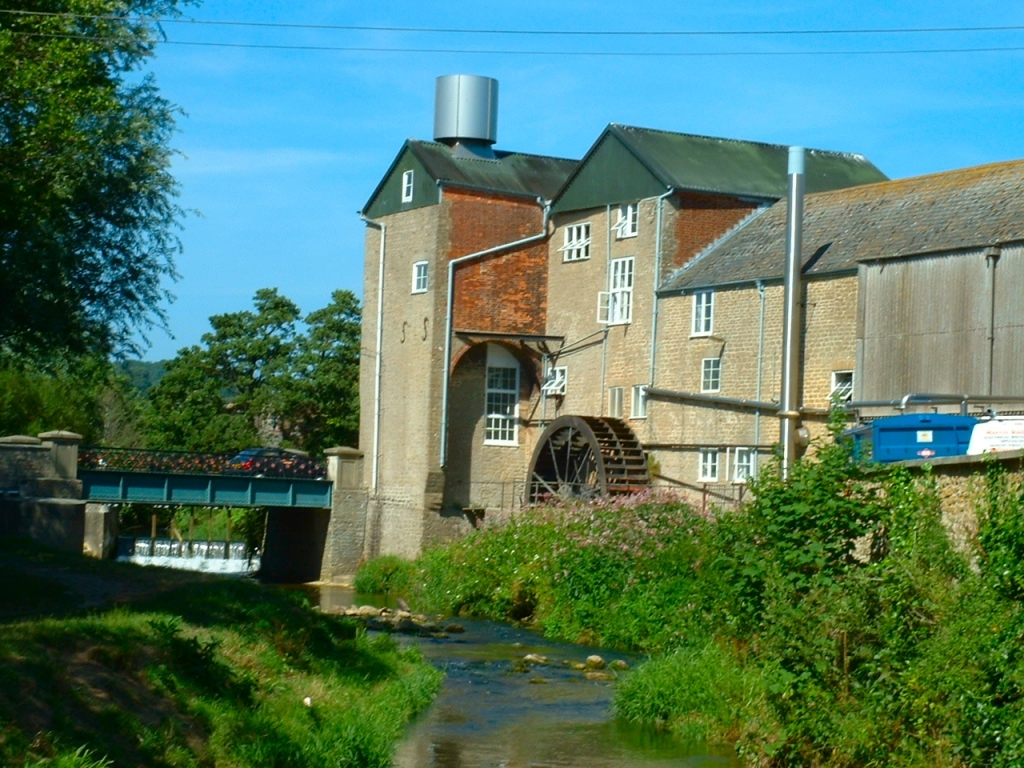
Palmer's Brewery

Writing in 1965, Ralph Wightman stated that "in the best possible meaning of the word Bridport has always been an industrial town, and its industries always had a connection with the countryside and the sea [...] Bridport has not had any industrial revolution. It has not blasted the countryside, and it has escaped the worst depressions. Perhaps this accounts for the fact that it has always been famous for good food and drink".

In 2012 there were 4,900 people employed in Bridport, 59% of whom were employed full-time and 41% part-time. The most important types of employment were distribution, accommodation and food (39% of non-agricultural employment), public administration, education and health (20%), production (18%) and construction (9%), with the remaining 14% accounted for by finance, ICT and other services. Major employers in the area include AmSafe, Dorset HealthCare University NHS Foundation Trust, Denhay Farms, Dorset Community NHS Trust, Dorset County Council, Edwards Sports Products, Gundry Bridport Ltd, Morrisons and Waitrose. Several firms in the town continue Bridport's heritage of rope and netmaking: Gundry Bridport Ltd manufacture rope and nets, AmSafe – formed by the industrial division of Gundry Bridport in 1979 – specialise in the design and manufacture of textile safety products for aerospace and defence, and Edwards Sports Products, operating in the town since 1884, manufacture sport nets for major events. Other companies in the town include Palmer's Brewery (JC & RH Palmer Ltd) and valve-manufacturer Curtiss Wright. There are seven business estates in and around the town: Gore Cross Business Park (6.1 hectares or 15 acres), St Andrews Trading Estate (2.4 hectares or 5.9 acres), North Mills Trading Estate (2.2 hectares or 5.4 acres), St Michael's Trading Estate (1.8 hectares or 4.4 acres), Dreadnought Trading Estate (1.6 hectares or 4.0 acres), Pineapple Business Park (1 hectare or 2.5 acres) and Old Laundry/Sea Road North (0.55 hectares or 1.4 acres).

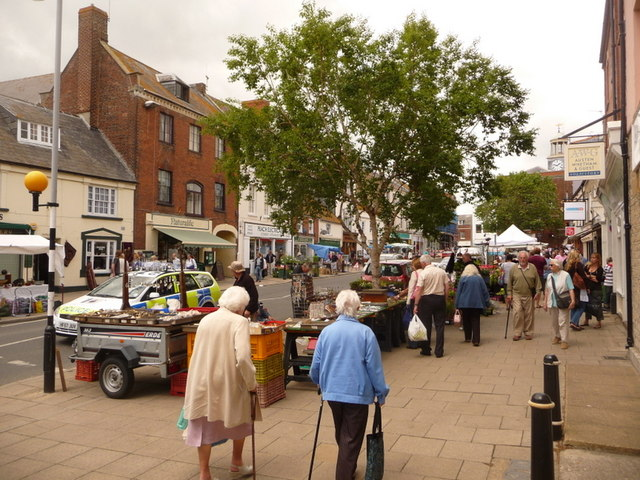
Saturday market in South Street

Bridport has a twice-weekly street market and monthly farmers' market. In 2005 there were 128 shops in the town, with a floorspace totalling 119,000 square feet (11,100 m^{2}). Several national chains have stores in the town, including WHSmith, Boots, Morrisons, Co-op, Superdrug, Waitrose, and Fat Face. The food retail catchment area of the town extends up to 5 miles north, east and west, and in 2001 had a population of 19,200. R J Balson & Son, a butcher's shop on West Allington, is known as "England's Oldest Family Butchers", and claims a continuous line of family butchers back to the year 1515. According to the Institute for Family Business, it is the oldest continuously trading family business in the UK.

West Bay is the nearest port to Bridport. West Bay harbour was used by ships carrying cargoes of timber during part of the 1970s.

== Culture, art and media ==
In the 21st century, Bridport's arts scene has contributed to the town becoming increasingly popular with people from outside the locality. It has an arts centre, theatre, library, cinema and museum, and several annual events.

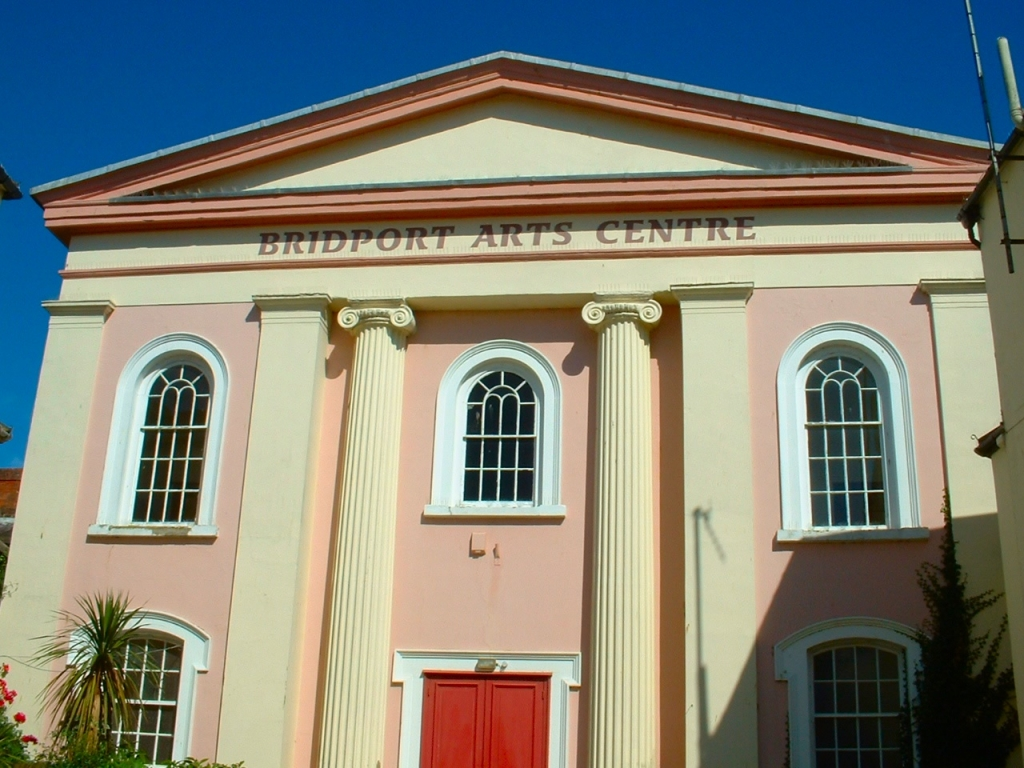
Bridport Arts Centre

Bridport Arts Centre originated in the early 1970s when local activists bought an old Wesleyan chapel and adjacent schoolroom on South Street and converted them into a theatre and art gallery—named the Allsop Gallery in memory of broadcaster and local resident Kenneth Allsop. The centre hosts a diverse programme of cultural events and since the 1990s has received funding from the Arts Council. In 1973 the centre founded the Bridport Prize, an annual international poetry and short story competition described by its patron Fay Weldon as "a prize really worth fighting for in terms of prestige and genuine literary accomplishment".

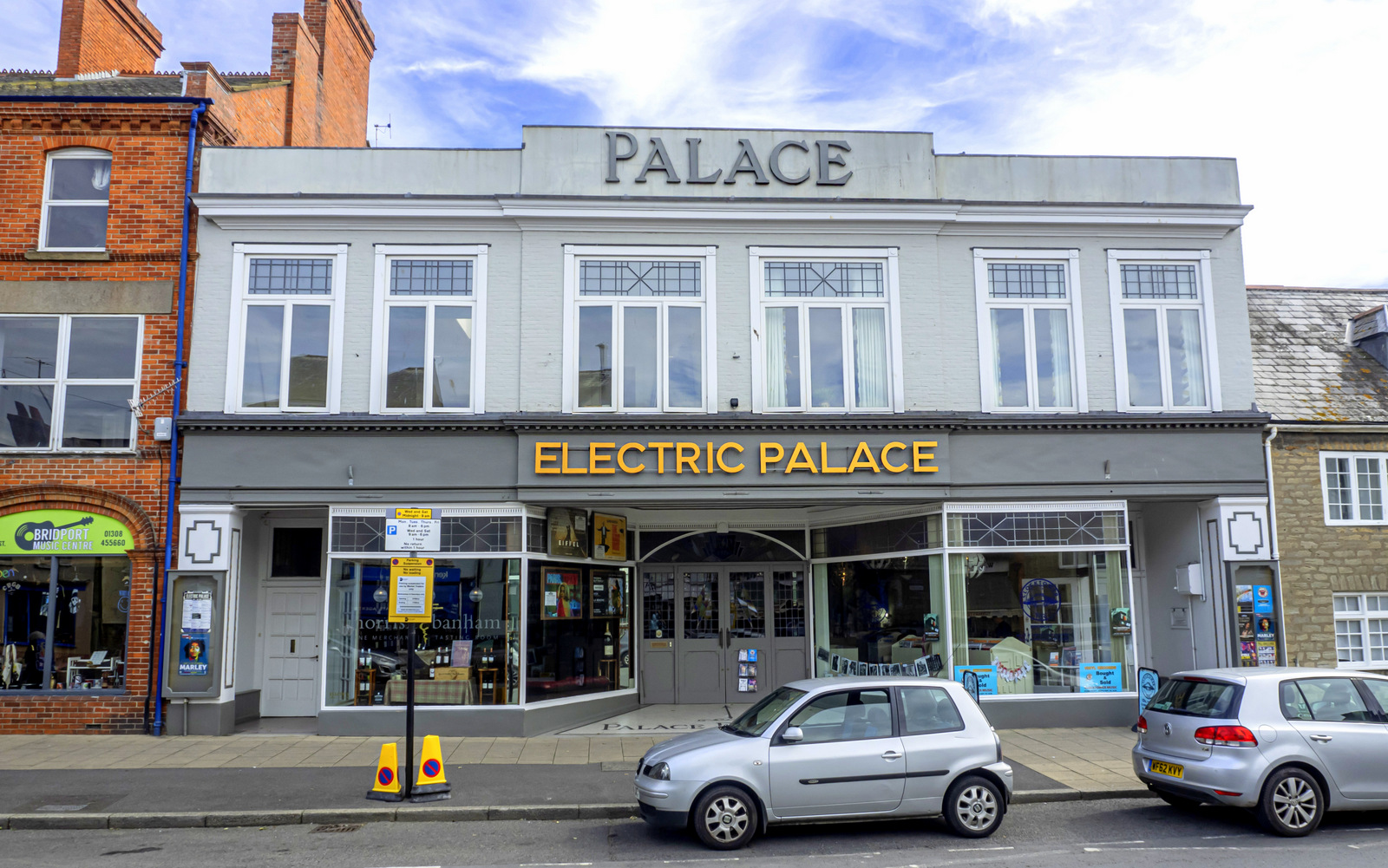
The Electric Palace Cinema

The Electric Palace Cinema has occupied its existing site since 1926. It closed down in 1999 but an ensuing campaign to 'Save the Palace' resulted in the building being listed before being bought by a new owner and refurbished to include a digital projector, auditorium murals, a new restaurant and art deco bar. It reopened in 2007 and in March 2009 hosted the world premiere of The Young Victoria.

The Lyric Theatre, which reopened in 2010, hosts quirky theatre, puppetry, comedy, clowning and music. It is also the base of children's theatre company Stuff and Nonsense. Bridport Museum, located in South Street, includes an extensive exhibition of the town's long history of rope-making.

Bridport features as 'Port Bredy' in the fictional 'Wessex' of Thomas Hardy's novels, and is the setting for Eden Phillpotts' 1918 novel The Spinners. Frederick Harcourt Kitchin, under the pseudonym Bennet Copplestone, used the area in his 1922 novel The Treasure of Golden Cap.

=== Events ===
Bridport holds a number of festivals. The Bridport Literary Festival has been running since 2005 and has played host to literary figures such as Elizabeth Jane Howard, Victoria Glendinning, Minette Walters and Fay Weldon. Bridport Food Festival is held in late June at Asker Meadow. It showcases locally produced foods for which the area is well known. The Food Festival week concludes with the Round Table Beer Festival. Since 2010, there has been an annual Hat Festival which takes place in 'Bucky Doo Square' for a weekend every September. An annual Christmas Tree Festival is held every December in the United Church. Over sixty trees are decorated by local and national charities, with visitors able to make donations.

Bridport holds an annual carnival on the third Saturday in August. The main feature is a carnival parade of floats, walking acts and majorettes, with other attractions including a car boot sale, fete and funfair. After the carnival South Street is closed for the night as live music is played while people dance in the street. The funfair is also open late. On the following night a torchlight procession takes place, with 1,500 torches carried 2 miles from the town centre to a bonfire at West Bay. This is followed by live music and fireworks. West Bay's funfair opens until late. The events raise money for local good causes and organisations.

Melplash Show, described by its organisers as "the South West’s premier agricultural exhibition", is held annually on the showground at West Bay on the Thursday before the August Bank Holiday weekend.

Local artists in Bridport and the surrounding area open up their studios as part of Bridport Open Studios, which marked its 15th year in 2013. The event takes place over the three days of the August Bank Holiday weekend and over 100 artists participate. The popularity of the event has led to three more open events in November, Easter and May. The biggest artist led venue is the St Michael's Studio complex on the St Michael's Trading Estate. It provides studios for 25 artists and attracted over 700 visitors to the 2009 event.

Other one-day events include the West Bay Wallow, a charity swim event in which participants often wear fancy dress, organised by the Bridport Round Table on Boxing Day, and a raft race in the River Brit basin, also at West Bay, in July; it is organised by the RNLI and participants race in homemade rafts and usually wear fancy dress. It has been run for over forty years and attracts thousands of spectators, with money raised for the RNLI.

=== Media ===
Bridport has one local weekly newspaper, the Bridport News, owned by Newsquest and published on Thursdays. The Dorset Echo also serves Bridport.

Bridport receives BBC Spotlight and ITV West Country television, transmitted in digital from the Stockland Hill Transmitter and a digital relay transmitter based at Highlands End. Local radio includes Greatest Hits Radio and BBC Radio Solent.

Bridport has one community website, Bridport Radio, which uses a newspaper style format. It mixes local information with comedic made-up news stories. The site allows users to comment on local subjects.

=== Filming location ===
Bridport and the surrounding area was used to film Hugh Fearnley-Whittingstall's Channel 4 television programme River Cottage and the BBC dramas Harbour Lights starring Nick Berry and Rockliffe's Folly starring Ian Hogg. West Bay was used to film the 1950s film The Navy Lark (based on the radio series of the same name), the opening credits of The Fall and Rise of Reginald Perrin, and much of the filming of the crime drama Broadchurch, starring David Tennant and Olivia Colman, and was written by Chris Chibnall who lives in Bridport.

== Transport ==
The A35 trunk road between Honiton and Southampton passes around the centre of Bridport on a bypass. Routes which start in the town include the A3066, which heads north through Beaminster towards Crewkerne, and the B3157 coast road to Weymouth. The busiest main route in the Bridport area is the A35 west of the town at Miles Cross, which in 2012 had an average of 15,200 vehicles per day – this was an 85% increase over vehicle numbers in 1983, but a 3% decrease compared to 2007. Other main routes around the town have experienced similar changes. Bridport is quite some distance from the UK motorway network with the nearest motorway access at junction 25 of the M5 at Taunton, 32 miles (51 km) away via the B3162 and A358 roads.

Bridport railway station was closed in May 1975, along with the Bridport – Maiden Newton branch line. The nearest railway stations to Bridport are Maiden Newton on the Heart of Wessex Line, Crewkerne on the West of England Main Line, and Dorchester South on the South West Main Line. There is a bus service (X51) linking the railway stations in Axminster, Dorchester and Weymouth, and another (X53) between Axminster and Weymouth via Bridport. There are a few buses a day northwards to Beaminster, Crewkerne and Yeovil, although travelling beyond Beaminster often involves a change. In 2017 Dorset County Council cut all rural bus subsidies in the area and so most of the surrounding villages are not served by scheduled services, with the exception of buses provided mainly for school transport but upon which the public is allowed to travel.

The nearest port with scheduled passenger services is Poole. The nearest international airports are Exeter and Bournemouth.

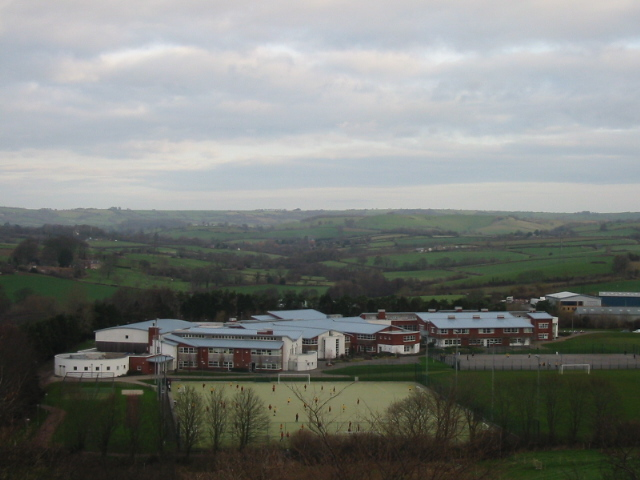
The Sir John Colfox Academy at Bradpole

== Education ==
Primary schools in Bridport are Bridport Primary School, St Mary's CE VC Primary School, St Catherine's RC Primary School and Symondsbury CE VC Primary School. The Sir John Colfox Academy is the town's only secondary school. It is located on the outskirts of the town and serves ages 11 to 18. The sixth form is combined with Beaminster School in nearby Beaminster. Children also attend other secondary schools within the region: The Woodroffe School in Lyme Regis, Colyton Grammar School in east Devon, and the Thomas Hardye School in Dorchester. There are daily buses running to these schools from Bridport. Further and higher education in the region is provided by Yeovil College, Weymouth College, Kingston Maurward College and Bournemouth University.

== Religion ==
St Mary's Church was founded in the 13th century though much of it dates from the 15th century and it was substantially restored and altered in the 19th century. There is a 17th-century brass in St. Catherine's Chapel that commemorates Edward Coker who was killed in 1685 during the Monmouth Rebellion. There is a strong connection with the Bridport United Church (Methodist/URC) and the two hold joint services, study groups and children's holiday clubs. The parish is linked with Roumois in the Diocese of Évreux, Normandy. The church has a maximum capacity of 400 and hosts many events. It has a peal of eight bells.

Opposite the church is a Society of Friends Meeting House. There has been a Quaker presence in the town since the middle of the 17th century. George Fox visited the Friends in the town in 1655 and said, "A fine Meeting there is there." The Bridport Quaker Meeting still meets for worship on Sunday and Wednesday mornings.

Bridport has a history of nonconformism; a Dissenters' Academy was built in the town in 1768, and by 1865 the single Anglican church, St Mary's, was outnumbered by non-Church-of-England establishments by seven to one. The Wesleyan chapel on South Street, now the Bridport Arts Centre, is a Grade II listed building; it was erected in 1838, designed by James Wilson of Bath, Somerset, and built by Charles and Joseph Galpin of Bridport.

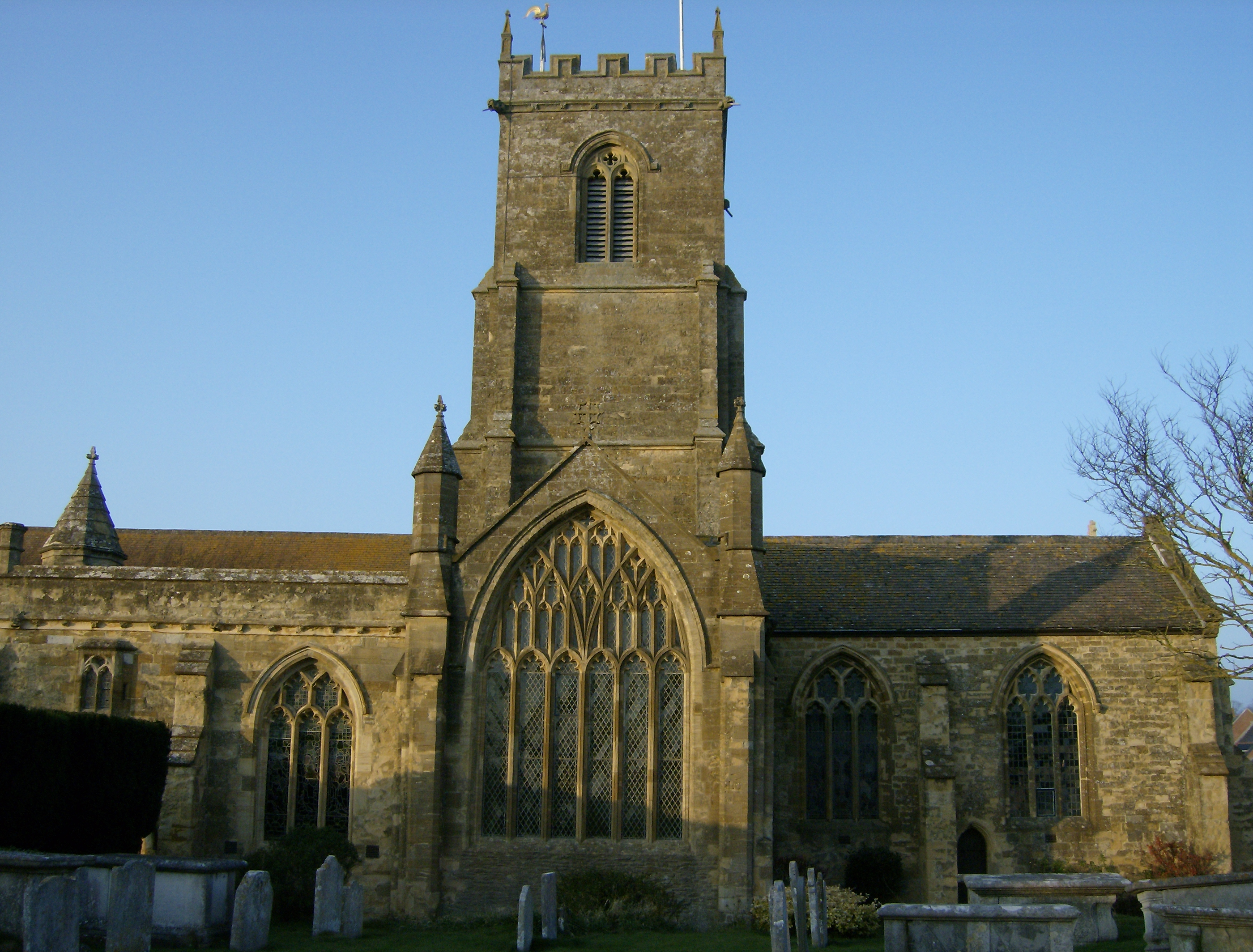
St Mary's parish church

The Unitarian "Chapel in the Garden", on the north side of East Street, provides a neutral development resource for an open faith community.

== Notable buildings ==
Within the parishes of Bridport, Allington, Bradpole and Bothenhampton are 514 structures that are listed by Historic England for their historical or architectural interest. Three of these are listed as Grade I (the designation of highest significance), seventeen are Grade II*, and the rest are Grade II. The three Grade I structures are Bridport Town Hall, the Parish Church of St Mary, and Holy Trinity Old Church in Bothenhampton. The seventeen Grade II* structures are: Bridport Museum, The Chantry and Daniel Taylor's almshouses (and wall of the Friends' burial place) in South Street; No. 34 and Granville House in West Street; the Literary and Scientific Institute (the old library), Granby House Masonic Hall, No.9 and the walls to the garden behind No.74 in East Street; Nos.133–139 (one structure) and the Church of St Swithun in North Allington; Nos. 27 and 29 (one structure) in West Allington; Downe Hall in Rawles Way; the Unitarian chapel in Rax Lane; Berry Farmhouse on Lower Walditch Lane; Messrs Norman goods warehouse in West Bay; and the new Holy Trinity Church in Bothenhampton. The George Inn dates from the 15th century and was where King Charles II stayed on his way to escape to France.

== Sport and leisure ==
6th hole, Port Coombe at the Bridport & West Dorset Golf Club

The town's football club is Bridport F.C., known as "The Bees". They currently play in the Western Football League Premier Division. The club was founded in 1885 and the home ground is St. Mary's Field. The town's rugby union club is Bridport RFC. Bridport & West Dorset Golf Club is situated atop of the east cliff at West Bay. The club has an 18-hole links course, driving range and pitch and putt course. Bridport Barracudas Swimming Club is based at Bridport Leisure Centre.

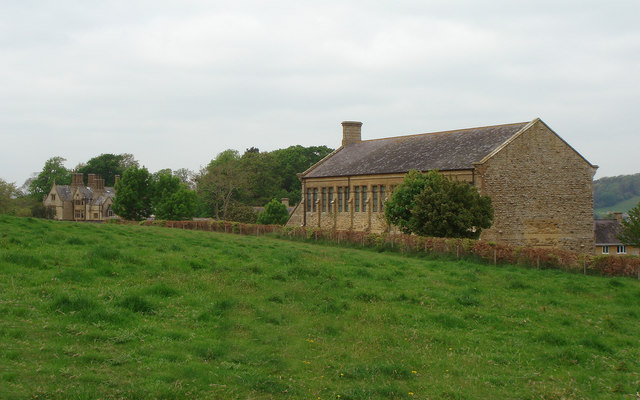
Hyde real tennis court with Hyde House to the left

A Water Polo section has junior and senior teams competing in the Dorset Water Polo League. Water Polo matches are held in summer in the outer harbour at West Bay, continuing a tradition dating back to 1898. The area also hosts a real tennis court, one of 27 in the UK. Hyde court, near the village of Walditch, was renovated and re-opened in 1998 with the aid of a lottery grant. Bowling is represented by Bridport Bowling Club, in Priory Lane (flat green outdoors in summer and short mat in winter), and Bridport Indoor Bowling Club in Shoe Lane.

== Notable people ==
Notable people connected with Bridport and its environs include Arthur Lee, 1st Viscount Lee of Fareham and rock musician singer-songwriter PJ Harvey, who were born there, as was first-class cricketer William Hounsell. American painter John Hubbard was based there in the 1960s and 1970s. Writer Tom Sharpe moved to the town in 1978, and socialist musician Billy Bragg lives at nearby Burton Bradstock. Restaurateur Mark Hix grew up in Bridport and painter George Biles worked there.

== See also ==
- Bridport (UK Parliament constituency)
