= Pearkes Gundry =

English cricketer

Personal information
- Full name: Joseph Pearkes Fox Gundry
- Born: 29 July 1837; Bridport, Dorset, England
- Died: 11 November 1891 (aged 54); Bothenhampton, Dorset, England
- Batting: Unknown

Domestic team information
- Years: Team
- 1859: Oxford University

Career statistics
Competition	First-class
Matches	2
Runs scored	26
Batting average	13.00
100s/50s	–/–
Top score	22
Catches/stumpings	2/–
- Source: Cricinfo, 3 March 2020

Joseph Pearkes Fox Gundry JP (29 July 1837 – 11 November 1891) was an English first-class cricketer.

The son of Joseph Gundry senior, he was born at Bridport in July 1837. He was educated at Winchester College, before going up to Merton College, Oxford. He made his debut in first-class cricket during his second year at Oxford, when he played for a combined Gentlemen of Kent and Sussex team against the Gentlemen of England at Lord's in 1857. His second first-class appearance came during his fourth year at Oxford, when he played for Oxford University against the Marylebone Cricket Club at Oxford in 1859.

After graduating from Oxford, Pearkes entered into the family business in Bridport manufacturing fishing nets and twine. He also served as a first lieutenant in the Bridport Artillery Volunteers, having joined in February 1860. Pearkes served as a justice of the peace for Dorset. A master of the Cattistock Hunt, he was killed in a riding accident while out with the hunt on 11 November 1891.
