= Coneygar =

Suburb of Bridport, Dorset, England

Coordinates: 50.737°N 02.756°W

- Location within Dorset
- OS grid reference: SY466932
- Civil parish: Bridport
- Unitary authority: Dorset
- Ceremonial county: Dorset
- Region: South West
- Country: England
- Sovereign state: United Kingdom
- Police: Dorset
- Fire: Dorset and Wiltshire
- Ambulance: South Western

Coneygar is a suburb of Bridport in Dorset, England. The name Conygar may come from two medieval words, coney meaning rabbit and garth meaning yard, and the area was once a warren where rabbits were bred for food. Also, coneygarth, a word quite similar to Conygar, was used in the past to describe housing for rabbits.
