= Frederick Harcourt Kitchin =

British journalist and novelist (1867–1932)

Frederick Harcourt Kitchin, (c. 1867–1932) was a British journalist, statistician and author.

== Journalism ==
Kitchin was the publisher of The Times Financial and Commercial Supplement from 1904 to 1908 and was an internationally recognised statistician in the field of nutrition. In 1918, Kitchin edited the Board of Trade Journal and in 1925, he co-wrote the autobiography of managing director of The Times, Charles Frederic Moberly Bell: Moberly Bell and his Times. Kitchin also wrote a number of books about the Royal Navy: The Secret of the Navy; What It Is and What We Owe to It (1918) and The Silent Watchers; England's Navy During the Great War; What It Is, and What We Owe to It. (1918)

== Novels ==
Kitchin wrote The Diversions of Dawson: a novel using his own name. Under the pseudonym of Bennet Copplestone, he wrote a number of adventures including The Lost Naval Papers (1917), The Last of the Grenvilles (1919), Madame Gilbert's Cannibal (1920), The Treasure of Golden Cap (1922) and Dead Men's Tales (1926)

Kitchin set many of his stories in and around North Devon, Lundy Island and the Dorset town of Bridport. The family of Sir Richard Grenville features heavily in his writing.

F. Harcourt Kitchin died in August 1932. His funeral was held at the Woking Crematorium on 10 August.
