= St Mary's Church, Bridport =

Coordinates: 50°43′50″N 2°45′30″W

St. Mary’s Church
- St Mary's Parish Church Bridport
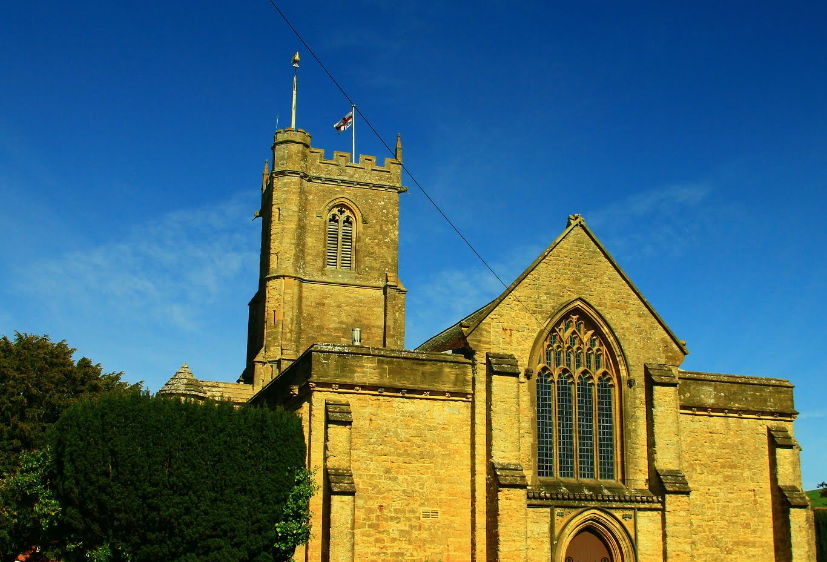
- St. Mary's Church in 2015
- St. Mary’s Church
- OS grid reference: SY 46577 92595
- Location: Bridport, Dorset
- Country: England
- Website: www.parishofbridport.org

History
- Status: Active

St Mary's Church is an Anglican parish church in Bridport, Dorset, England. It is a Grade I listed building. Part of the Bridport Team Ministry, it is the civic church of the town and principal church of the Parish of Bridport.

There is a strong connection with the Bridport United Church (Methodist/United Reformed Church) and the two hold joint services, study groups and children's holiday clubs. The parish is linked with Roumois in the Roman Catholic Diocese of Évreux, Normandy, France. The church has a maximum capacity of 400 and hosts many events. It has a peal of eight bells.

== History ==
The earliest remains of the church, dating from the early 13th century, are to be found in the north and south transepts. Much of the rest of the building, including the central tower, dates from the late 14th century and the 15th century. The church was substantially restored and altered in the 19th century.

There is a 17th-century monumental brass in St. Catherine's Chapel that commemorates Edward Coker who was killed in 1685 during the Monmouth Rebellion, reportedly of a gunshot wound on East Street.
