= Allington, Dorset =

Village in Dorset, England

Coordinates: 50.7366°N 2.7646°W

Allington
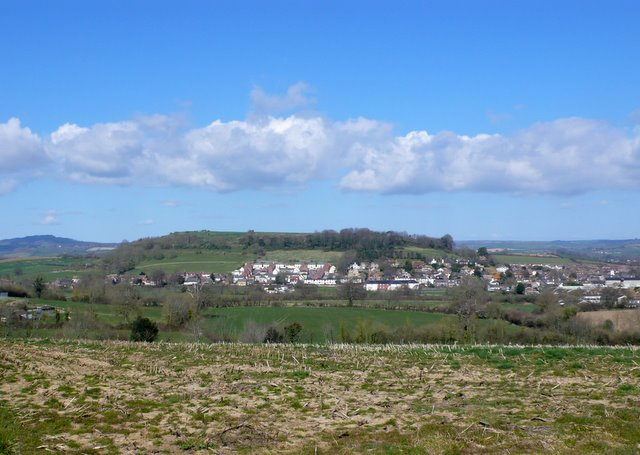
- Allington and Allington Hill from the south

- Location within Dorset
- Population: 766
- OS grid reference: SY459933
  - London: 123 mi (198 km) WSW
- Civil parish: Bridport
- Unitary authority: Dorset
- Ceremonial county: Dorset
- Region: South West
- Country: England
- Sovereign state: United Kingdom
- Post town: Bridport
- Postcode district: DT6
- Police: Dorset
- Fire: Dorset and Wiltshire
- Ambulance: South Western
- Website: http://www.allington.co.uk/

Allington is a neighbourhood of Bridport in Dorset, England, immediately north-west of Bridport town centre on the west bank of the River Brit. Formerly a separate village and civil parish, Allington and Bridport had grown to be contiguous by the end of the 19th century.

Allington Hill rises to 89 metres (292 ft) above the town; it is managed by the Woodland Trust. The hill is characteristic of the Upper Greensand hills and ridges found in the Marshwood and Powerstock Vales National Character Area.

In 1086 in the Domesday Book Allington was recorded as Adelingtone; it had 21 households, 3 ploughlands, 10 acres (4.0 ha) of meadow and one mill. It was in Goderthorn Hundred and the lord and tenant-in-chief was Turstin son of Rolf.

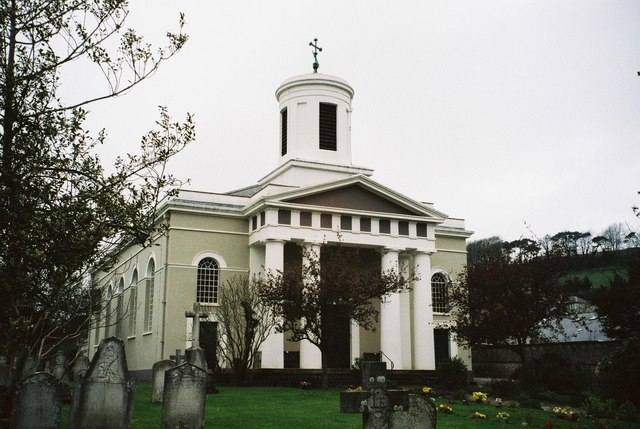
St Swithun's Church

The parish church at North Allington, dedicated to St Swithun, was designed by Charles Wallis of Dorchester and built in 1826–27, and is a Grade II* listed building. It is in classical style, and is unusual for the survival of a high proportion of the original internal fittings, including the pews, gallery, a pulpit (of two originally present) and glazing.

== Governance ==
At the lower tier of local government, Allington is in Bridport civil parish. It is part of Bridport West and Allington electoral ward, which elects five of the 20 members of Bridport Town Council.

The upper tier of local government is the Dorset unitary authority. Allington is in Bridport electoral ward, which elects three of the 82 members of Dorset Council. Before the creation of the Dorset unitary authority, Allington was in West Dorset district from 1974 to 2019. Before this, Allington civil parish was in Bridport Rural District from 1894 to 1974, though much of the built-up part of Allington had already transferred to Bridport Municipal Borough.

For elections to the UK national parliament, Allington is within the West Dorset parliamentary constituency.

=== Allington parish ===
Historically, Allington was a civil parish separate from Bridport. Over time, much of the built-up area of the Allington neighbourhood, including the area around St Swithun's Church, transferred to Bridport Municipal Borough or later Bridport civil parish, leaving only a suburban fringe and rural hinterland in Allington parish. When the parish was abolished on 1 April 2024, rural parts of the parish area which weren't taken into Bridport parish went to Symondsbury parish.

In the 2011 census, Allington civil parish had 371 dwellings, 339 households and a population of 766.
