= Holy Trinity Church, Bothenhampton =

Church in Dorset, England

Coordinates: 50.7247°N 2.7517°W

Holy Trinity Church is a Church of England parish church at Bothenhampton, near Bridport in Dorset, England. It was designed and built by the English arts and crafts architect Edward Schroeder Prior in 1887–89. It is a Grade II* listed building.

== Background ==
Holy Trinity Bothenhampton was Edward Prior's first church. He undertook an extensive study of local churches and developed a sophisticated analytical approach to designing the building, and a philosophy that sought to build appropriately for its religious function. The roof was the most radical feature of the church, later forming the model for the great roof at Prior's masterwork at St Andrew's Church, Roker. Elements of Richard Norman Shaw's influence remain, particularly in the porch but Prior's knowledge and love of Early English church architecture in particular dominate. Prior was careful to use local materials, selected with skill and handled with craftsmanship. He was also able to develop furnishings and decoration to provide a holistic design for the church and its fittings.

By the late 19th century the 15th-century Holy Trinity Old Church, Bothenhampton had fallen into disrepair. The church was also too small for the congregation. The new church was funded by J. P. F. Grundy, one of the directors of the West Bay Building Company, by public subscription and anonymous donation.

== Site considerations ==
The church is located on a promontory, on the side of the valley of the river Bride. It is directly exposed to westerly and south westerly winds and is located only a mile from the coast. It is approached through a lych gate and up a steeply climbing path from the village high street. The northern elevation nestles into the hillside. Recognising the exposed nature of the site and in keeping with his general philosophy of building, Prior made a careful study of local vernacular traditions and developed a systematic approach to design analysis. The analysis led Prior to define the major influences on and form of the design as;

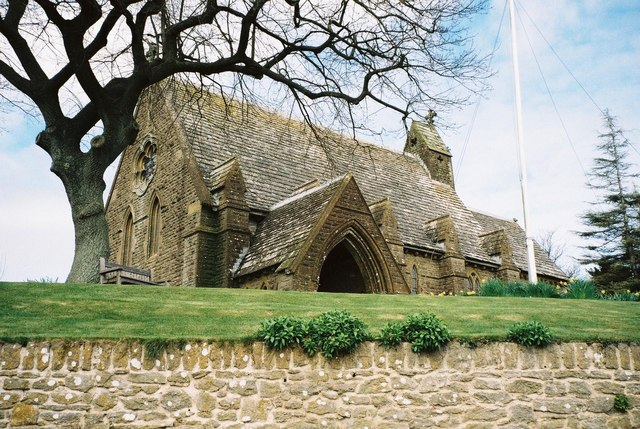
Holy Trinity, Bothenhampton

- The site and its orientation provided strong northern light, therefore only small windows would be required.
- The church must be warm dictating thick walls and a sheltered position.
- Protection from the weather was needed, e.g. a lobby on the north or south sides.
- The congregation would require good seating in audible range of and with an uninterrupted view of the preacher.

== Design ==
The design went through at least three major revisions. Initially the church was to have no aisles or transepts, but a tower. The chancel was to be higher than the nave. In the second design a bellcote was substituted for the tower and the chancel became conventional. In the final design the chancel was simplified to have four small lancets, and a revised bellcote.

The church is constructed of coarse snecked Bothenhampton stone, a form of Forest Marble, from Grundy's quarry. The stone work is rough axe faced, and Prior used the largest pieces that he could obtain constructing walls 3 ft thick. The entire church sits on a plinth of blue-grey lias shale from Kimmeridge. This material is also used for the lower off-setts of the buttresses.

The roof is of heavy Yorkshire limestone due to the exposed location. The exterior dressings and the porch are constructed of Ham stone skillfully worked and carved. The interior dressings are of Bath stone.

The roof structure was the most radical feature of the building. It is supported by three stone arches “thrown across the nave at intervals primarily to “avoid the creaking and straining of the timbers” that was characteristic of timber roof construction in exposed locations. The arches are two centred and chamfered. They spring at 2’6 above floor level and rise to a ridge 30’ high. They are buttressed externally, the buttresses rising through the eaves. The arches support 14 oak purlins to each side. The nave measures 50’ x 25’ with four bays. It is floored with pine blocks under the seating and 12” square quarry tiles with stone borders in the main floor.

The nave windows have deep inner reveals. It has one double and two single lancet windows on the south elevation and four single lancets on the north. The west end has two small lancets, now filled with commemorative glass, below a rose window. The remaining windows are filled with a forerunner of Prior's Early English Glass.

The chancel is relatively small at 15’ x 13’, but it is sufficiently large for all its functions and to provide an open view of the altar or holy table to the congregation. It is five steps above the nave. The timber roof springs from a gallery of six blank arches on corbels to either side. The windows have deep inner reveals, as does the sedilia. There are four lancets to the south and two to the north. The organ loft and vestry is to the north side of the chancel. The vestry is connected directly to the pulpit through a door a pulpit level and the organ located through an arch. The sanctuary measures 10’ x 13. The chancel and sanctuary have red and yellow quarry tiled floors with stone borders. The east window has three lancets and a trefoil with decorative stained glass.

The porch is set on the relatively sheltered south side and is lit by three trefoil windows on each side. It has a pointed entrance arch that springs from two shafts of unpolished granite and eight internal steps leading up to the door.

A small bell turret is located to the south side between the nave and chancel and is carried apart on the gable and part corbelled out from the chancel.

== Interior ==
Prior provided a heating system using low pressure coils throughout the church and a boiler room to the north of the chancel 3’ below the nave floor level. Electric lighting was not supplied until 1945.

Prior disliked the separation in Victorian church building between architecture and furnishings, regarding most interior furnishings as sad failures. He firmly believed in the integration of architecture and furnishings and in the need for an appropriate treatment;

"A church is a place of common assembly for worship of God. It should be reverential, simple and honest. Ornate treatment was out of place here, and students should aim at a graceful effect.... not flimsy and coarse."

At Bothenhampton Prior designed the font, the altar rails, the choir stalls, and chest, the doors. The altar table was designed with William Lethaby and executed by Augustus Mason. All the furnishings were in English oak. Lethaby designed the altar front in gesso, with intertwined wild roses, leaves and stems. A wrought iron chancel screen was added in 1895.

The font has a round alabaster bowl supported on eight polished shafts with moulded Early English style capitals. The base is formed by a square of Keinton stone with two half circular steps.

== Construction ==
The church took five years to complete largely because of the Incorporated Church Building Society's concerns with the experimental roof structure. The Society provided grants for church construction, but could force changes on the design requested by its panel of architects, as a condition of making the grant. The panel repeatedly rejected Prior's design. Its members included J. P. Seddon, James Brooks, Ewan Christian and J. O. Scott and subsequently David Brandon, William White and Norman Shaw. Prior provided detailed structural plans and justifications for the roof, providing information on a wide range of existing examples, including the Treasury, Merton College, Oxford, The Hall at Ightham Mote and Shaw's hall at Adcote, Shropshire. Prior made some alterations, including the omission of iron cramps and ties and had his calculations checked by leading civil engineers. As a result, the design was allowed to proceed.

Prior employed a local builder called Thomas Patten to carry out the work. Construction took over two years with problems associated with damp in the interior, rising costs and annoyed parishioners. Prior himself gave a donation, in addition to giving the chancel seating, altar rails and altar, partly as a result of the difficulties.
