= Inn sign =

Signage on an inn

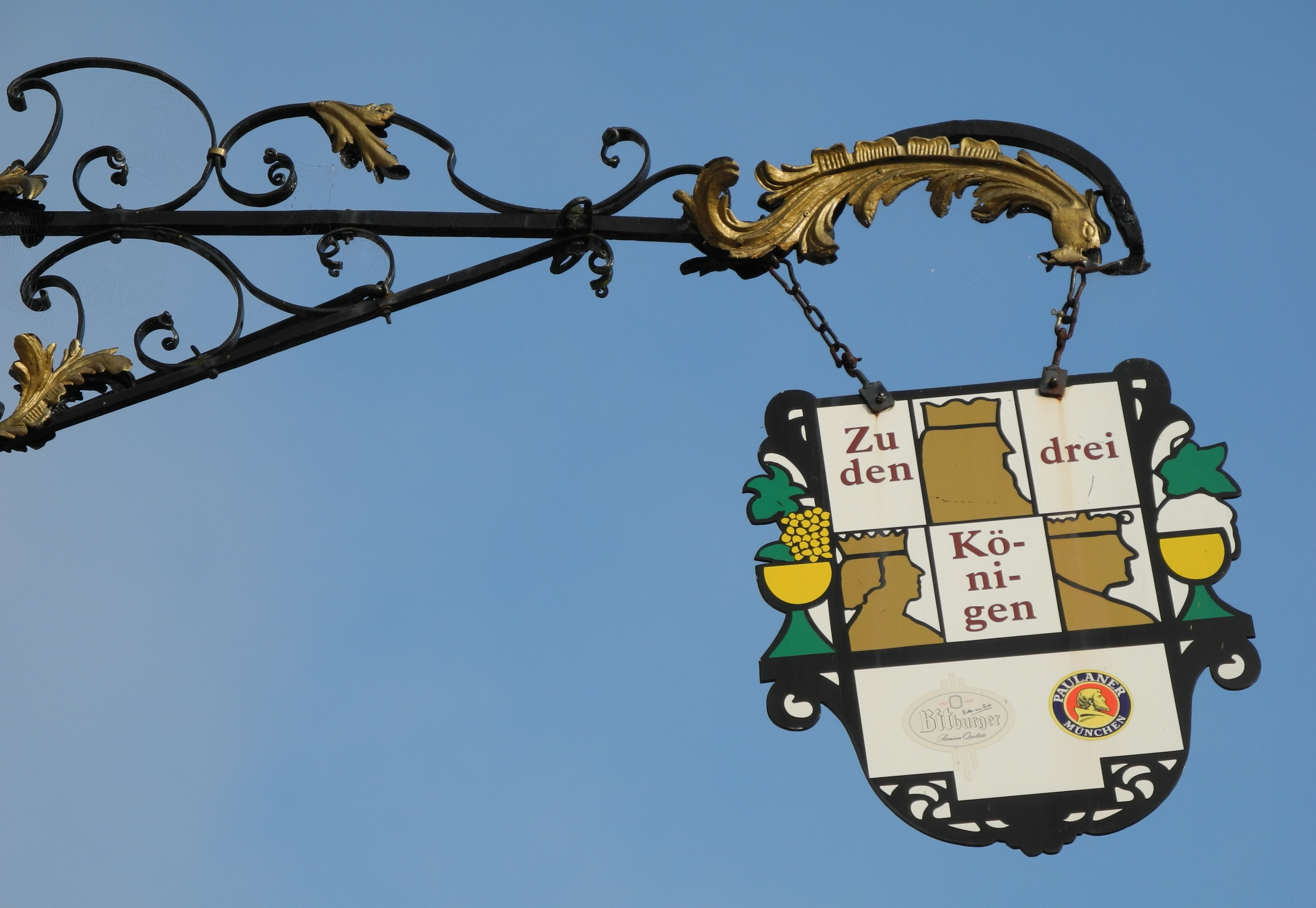
Sign at the Gasthaus Drei Könige in Bundenthal

Inn signs have a history that extends beyond the Middle Ages, when many houses were identified by a sign, often a heraldic charge, which signified that the premises were under the special care of a nobleman, or a vivid image that impressed itself on the memory. The ruins of Herculaneum and Pompeii reveal that most of their street-front shops displayed an identifying sign outside.

In Ireland and the United Kingdom especially, the tradition, by which publicans were obliged to identify their premises by a sign, dating from the reign of Richard II, is carried on today. A selection of inn signs carved on slabs and rescued after the Great Fire of London is preserved in the Guildhall.

Pub sign painters are often poorly documented; an exception was Dorset painter George Biles, who attracted attention in media for his career lasting to the age of 87, and many of whose signs and studio materials were preserved after his death.
