= Bridport Town Hall =

Municipal building in Bridport, Dorset, England

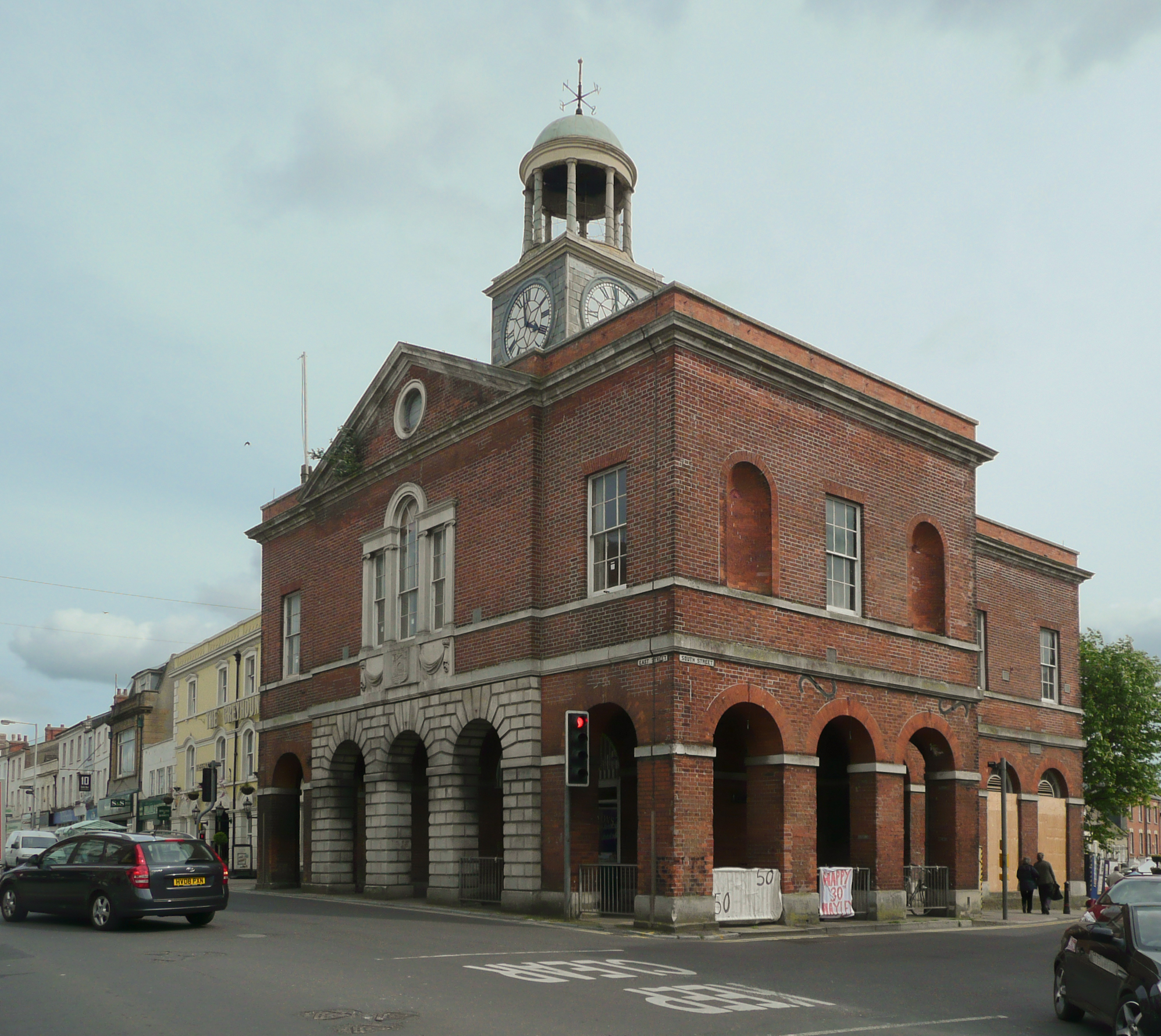
- Town Hall viewed from West Street, 2009

- Shown in Dorset
- 50.7334°N 2.7582°W
- Location: South Street, Bridport, Dorset

History
- Built: 1786

Site notes
- Architect: William Tyler RA

Listed Building – Grade I
- Designated: 28 November 1950
- Reference no.: 1227851

Bridport Town Hall is an 18th-century town hall on South Street in Bridport, Dorset, England. It is a Grade I listed building.

== History ==
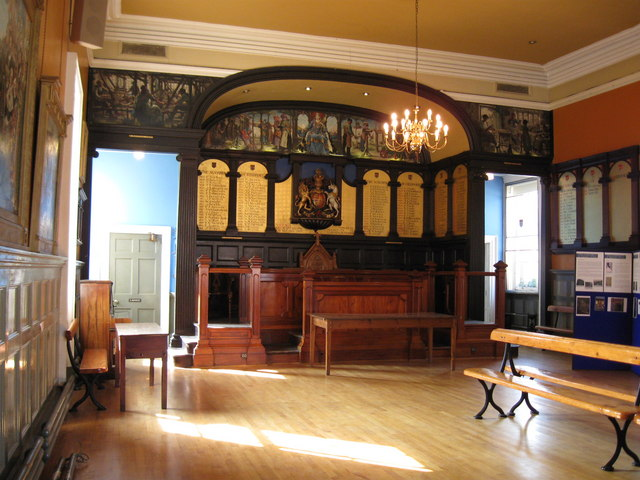
Interior showing the murals by Francis Newbery

The site selected for the town hall had previously been occupied by the Chapel of St Andrew, which was built for Carmelite Friars some time before 1268. The town hall was designed by architect William Tyler RA, a founding member of the Royal Academy and built by James Mason at a cost of £3,000 between 1785 and 1786.

The clock tower with cupola and weather vane was paid for by Sir Evan Nepean and was added to the building around 1805; that year a chiming clock with four seven-foot dials was installed by Handley & Moore of Clerkenwell. The two-storey, brick building was built in a T-shape, with the stem of the T pointing south. The ground floor was originally an arcaded open market, while the first floor housed the council chamber. The main front, facing north onto East Street, was given five bays of arcading. Its central three bays are of projecting rusticated ashlar, surmounted by the sculpted Bridport coat of arms, a Venetian window and a pediment. On the inside the upper floor was supported by ten octagon-shaped ship's masts. The clock tower was renewed in 1825.

A new clock mechanism was installed in 1919 by John Smith of Derby, and the bells were recast in 1928. In 1925, the interior of town hall was redecorated to a design by Francis Newbery, who had been brought up in Bridport, had worked as a school teacher in the town and had subsequently become the Director of the Glasgow School of Art. The decoration included a mural of panels depicting (from left to right) weaving, spinning, a female figure representing the town, yarn processing and net braiding. Newbery also presented several important paintings to the local council including one depicting Joan of Navarre, Second Wife of King Henry IV, entering Bridport in January 1403 and another depicting King Charles II's escape from Bridport after the Battle of Worcester in September 1651.

The town hall became the headquarters of Bridport Municipal Borough Council but ceased to be the local seat of government when the enlarged West Dorset Council was formed in 1974. In 2011 work started on the refurbishment of the building to a design by Jonathan Rhind Architects with support from the Heritage Lottery Fund; improvements included a new lift, new heating and restoration work on the original structural system supporting the upper floor. The work was carried out by Farnrise Construction at a cost of £1.4 million and the building officially re-opened in January 2012. External works, including re-painting of windows and re-pointing of brickwork, were carried out in May 2020.
