= Bridport Arts Centre =

Arts centre in Bridport, Dorset, United Kingdom

Coordinates: 50°43′59″N 2°45′28″W

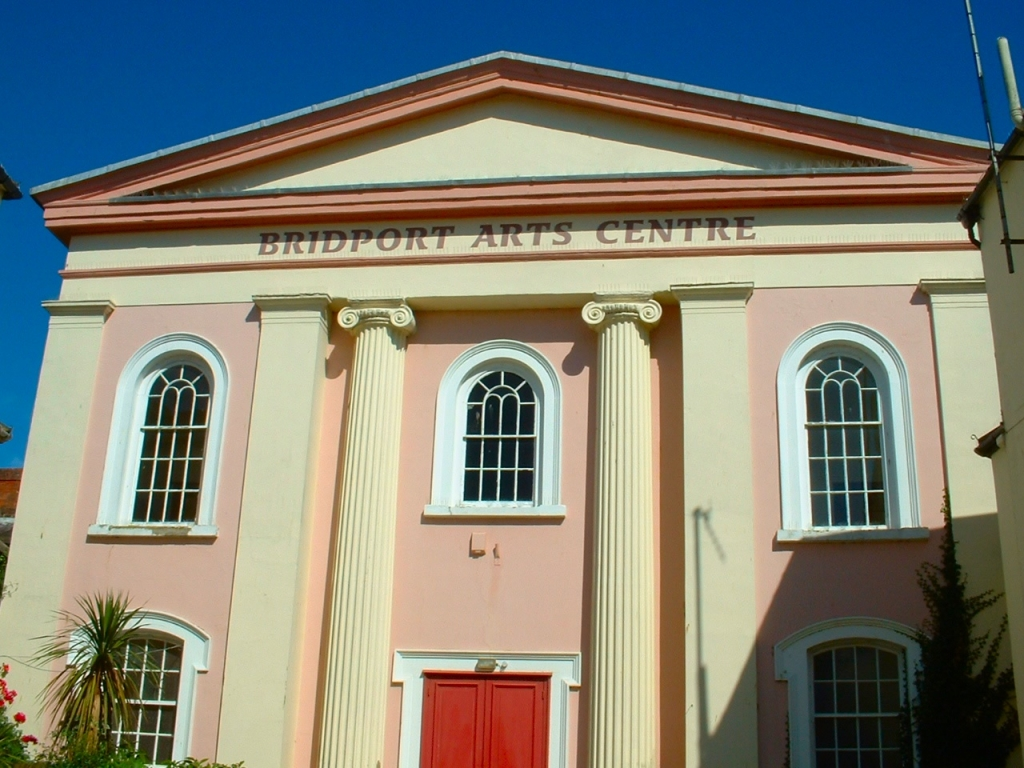
Bridport Arts Centre in 2006

Bridport Arts Centre is an arts centre in Bridport, Dorset, England. Founded in 1973, it is housed in and around a 19th-century, Grade II listed building, formerly known as the Wesleyan Methodist Chapel. The complex includes the Marlow Theatre, the Allsop Gallery and a cinema.

The centre runs the Bridport Prize, an international literary competition. Annual awards are made in four categories: short stories, poetry, flash fiction and first novel. The winners are announced during the Bridport Open Book Festival. The centre also runs the From Page to Screen Festival, an annual film festival celebrating literary adaptations.

== History ==
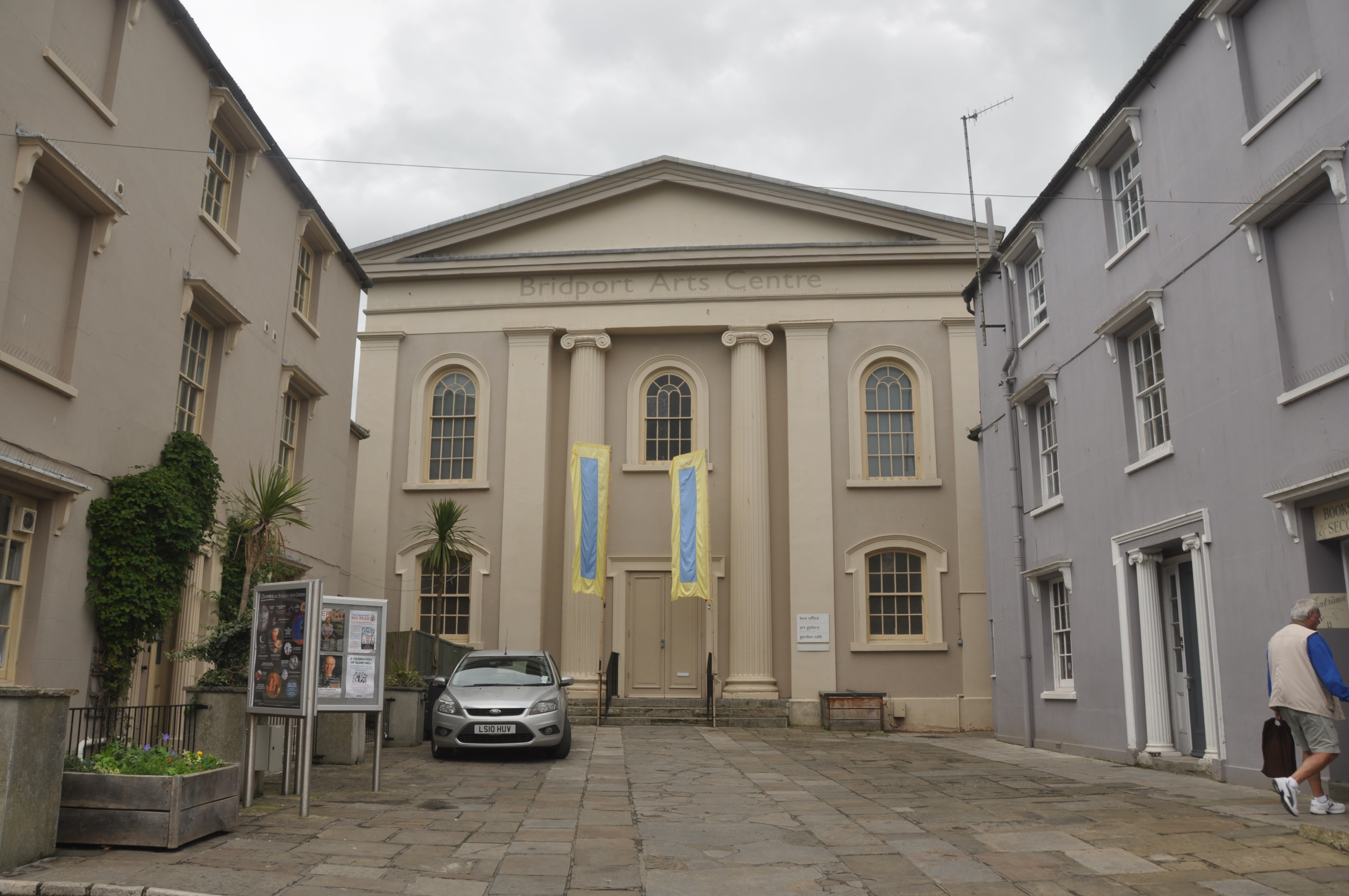
The centre in 2013

The Methodist chapel was designed by the architect James Wilson of Bath. It was built in 1838, and opened on 28 November of that year. The front elevation, having four giant Doric pilasters with entablature and pediment, originally had "Wesleyan Methodist Chapel" written on its frieze. It is a Grade II listed building.

The arts centre was founded in 1973, with Peggy Chapman-Andrews (1921–2013) playing a leading role in its establishment. The chapel was converted into the Marlow Theatre, with a seating capacity of 200. The chapel's adjacent schoolroom was converted into the Allsop Gallery, an exhibition space named after Kenneth Allsop.

In February 2016, Arts Council England agreed to provide a grant of £344,200 to renovate the Marlow Theatre and other facilities, subject to the centre raising a further £230,000. The centre re-opened in September 2016, after renovations costing £444,000.

== Bridport Prize ==
The Bridport Prize International Creative Writing Competition was founded in 1973 by Peggy Chapman-Andrews, originally as a fund-raising scheme for the new arts centre. Levels of international participation soon rose. Fay Weldon became Patron in 2006. There were originally two categories, poetry and short stories. In 2010 a new category, flash fiction, was added. In 2014, the Peggy Chapman-Andrews first novel award was added.

The winners are announced during a literary festival, the Bridport Open Book Festival, which is run by the centre in the autumn. Each year's top four poems are entered for the Forward Prizes for Poetry, while the top 13 stories (if British) are entered for the BBC National Short Story Award and the Sunday Times EFG Private Bank Short Story Award.

The centre runs the From Page to Screen Festival, celebrating adaptations of books to film, in the spring.
