= River Simene =

River in Dorset, England

Coordinates: 50°43′53″N 2°45′43″W

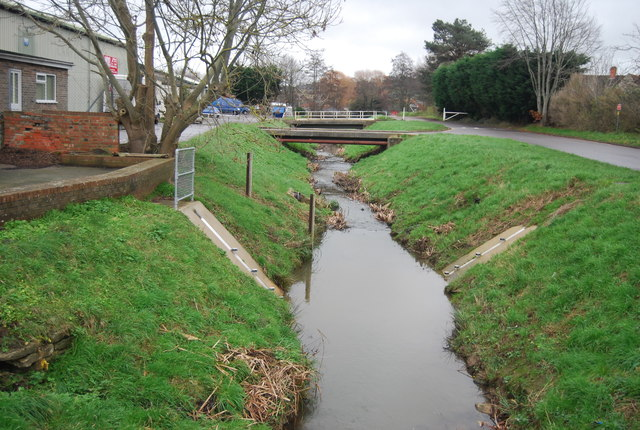
River Simene in 2011

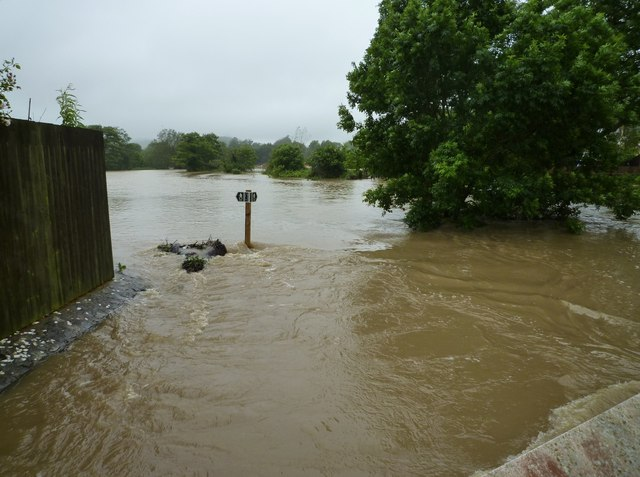
The flooded River Simene in 2012

The River Simene is a small river in Dorset, England. It flows in west Dorset through the village of Symondsbury before joining the River Brit.

== History ==
The river flooded in 2012 and 2023.
