= Holy Trinity Old Church, Bothenhampton =

Church in Dorset, England

Holy Trinity Old Church
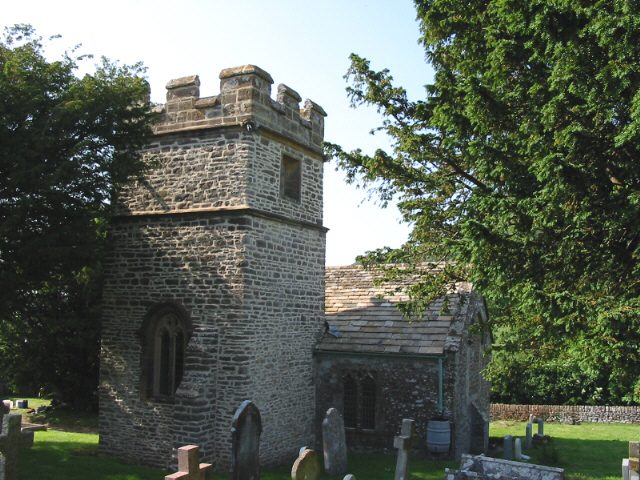

- Location within Dorset
- 50°43′22.9″N 2°44′40.9″W
- Location: Bothenhampton, Dorset, England

History
- Built: 14th century

Listed Building – Grade I
- Official name: Old Holy Trinity
- Designated: 5 September 1960
- Reference no.: 1324171

Holy Trinity Old Church in Bothenhampton, Dorset, England was built in the 13th or 14th century. It is recorded in the National Heritage List for England as a designated Grade I listed building, and is now a redundant church in the care of the Churches Conservation Trust. It was declared redundant on 1 April 1971, and was vested in the Trust on 23 October 1972.

== History ==
The church was built in the 13th or 14th century. The chancel and the 15th-century tower are the only parts of this mediaeval parish church to survive.

In the 1880s the nave was demolished and the new Holy Trinity Church was built in the village by Edward Schroeder Prior. The old church continued to be used as a mortuary chapel until 1971.

Subsequently, the chancel was used as a mortuary chapel. In 1971, the dilapidated state of the church lead to it being formally declared redundant and in 1972 it became the responsibility of the Redundant Churches Fund, which became the Churches Conservation Trust.

== Architecture ==
The stone building now consists of the three-bay chancel with a stone slab roof of arch-braced collar construction. The chancel is approximately 21 feet (6.4 m) long and 10 feet 6 inches (3.20 m) wide. The two or three-stage tower to the south of the chancel has gargoyles and a parapet. It is supported by short buttresses. The doorway on the west side has a plank door.

The interior of the church includes an early Georgian reredos, and a 13th-century font although the base and stem are from the 20th century.

== See also ==
- List of churches preserved by the Churches Conservation Trust in South West England
