= Alan Hounsell =

New Zealand cricketer

Personal information
- Full name: Alan Russell Hounsell
- Born: 8 February 1947 (age 79); Christchurch, New Zealand
- Batting: Right-handed
- Bowling: Right-arm fast-medium

Domestic team information
- Years: Team
- 1969/70–1971/72: Canterbury
- 1972/73: Wellington
- 1973/74: Auckland
- 1974/75: Northern Districts
- 1975/76–1976/77: Canterbury

Career statistics
| Competition | First-class | List A |
|---|---|---|
| Matches | 37 | 10 |
| Runs scored | 250 | 33 |
| Batting average | 10.00 | 8.25 |
| 100s/50s | 0/0 | 0/0 |
| Top score | 27* | 16 |
| Balls bowled | 5,166 | 495 |
| Wickets | 78 | 17 |
| Bowling average | 31.85 | 16.88 |
| 5 wickets in innings | 1 | 0 |
| 10 wickets in match | 0 | 0 |
| Best bowling | 5/50 | 4/50 |
| Catches/stumpings | 14/– | 6/– |
- Source: ESPNcricinfo, 2 June 2023

Alan Russell Hounsell (born 8 February 1947) is a New Zealand former cricketer. He played first-class and List A cricket for Auckland, Canterbury, Northern Districts and Wellington between 1968 and 1977.

An opening bowler, Hounsell played several years of representative under-age cricket before progressing to Canterbury's senior team. For Canterbury Under-23s against Northern Districts Under-23s in February 1969, he took 7 for 19 off 12 overs. His most successful first-class season was 1971–72, when he took 18 wickets at an average of 20.88, and took his best figures of 5 for 50 for Canterbury against Wellington.

Hounsell went into the insurance industry, where his success in sales and marketing, on top of his experience in cricket as a player, coach and selector, led Table Tennis New Zealand to select him in 1996 as the first chairman of its board.
