= AmSafe =

Air safety and securement product company

AmSafe Inc. is a manufacturer of air safety and securement products to the aerospace, defense, and ground transportation industries and maker of aircraft seatbelts. AmSafe makes the Aviation Inflatable Restraint (AAIR), a seatbelt airbag approved by the FAA designed to improve occupant protection from serious head injury during an otherwise unsurvivable aircraft accident. The airbag allows manufacturers and airlines to meet the FAA 16g seat retrofit rule that mandates all aircraft comply by October 2009 (1).

AmSafe’s aviation products can be found on most commercial aircraft, including seat belts, restraints, cargo and barrier nets, tie-downs, and cabin interior textiles. Headquartered in Phoenix, Arizona, AmSafe operates manufacturing and service facilities around the world. Numerous general aviation aircraft manufactures have adopted the airbag, including Mooney, Cessna and Cirrus.

The Marmon Group founded this company. In 2004 it was purchased by an investor group led by The Pritzker Group and Admiralty Partners, Inc.. In 2007, it was further acquired by a new investment group led by Berkshire Partners and The Greenbriar Group. In 2012, it was acquired by TransDigm Group.
