= William Hounsell =

English cricketer

Personal information
- Born: 25 December 1820; Bridport, Dorset, England
- Died: 12 June 1903 (aged 82); Bridport, Dorset, England

Domestic team information
- Years: Team
- 1849–1850: Hampshire

Career statistics
Competition	FC
Matches	2
Runs scored	9
Batting average	2.25
100s/50s	–/–
Top score	7
Balls bowled	–
Wickets	–
Bowling average	–
5 wickets in innings	–
10 wickets in match	–
Best bowling	–
Catches/stumpings	2/–
- Source: Cricinfo, 15 February 2010

William Hounsell (25 December 1820 – 12 June 1903) was an amateur English first-class cricketer.

Hounsell represented Hampshire in two first-class matches against the All-England Eleven in 1849 and 1850. Hounsell also represented Dorset in numerous minor matches.

Hounsell died at Bridport, Dorset on 12 June 1903.
