= William Tyler (architect) =

English sculptor, landscaper and architect

William Tyler from The Portraits of the Academicians of the Royal Academy

William Tyler RA (18 April 1728 – 6 September 1801) was an English sculptor, landscaper, and architect, and one of the three founding members of the Royal Academy, in 1768. He was Director of the Society of Artists.

== Early life ==
Tyler went to Westminster School, and then studied for some years with leading sculptor Louis François Roubiliac who had moved to London in 1732. Tyler married in 1750, aged 22, and is said to have initially lived in Dean Street.

== Sculpture ==
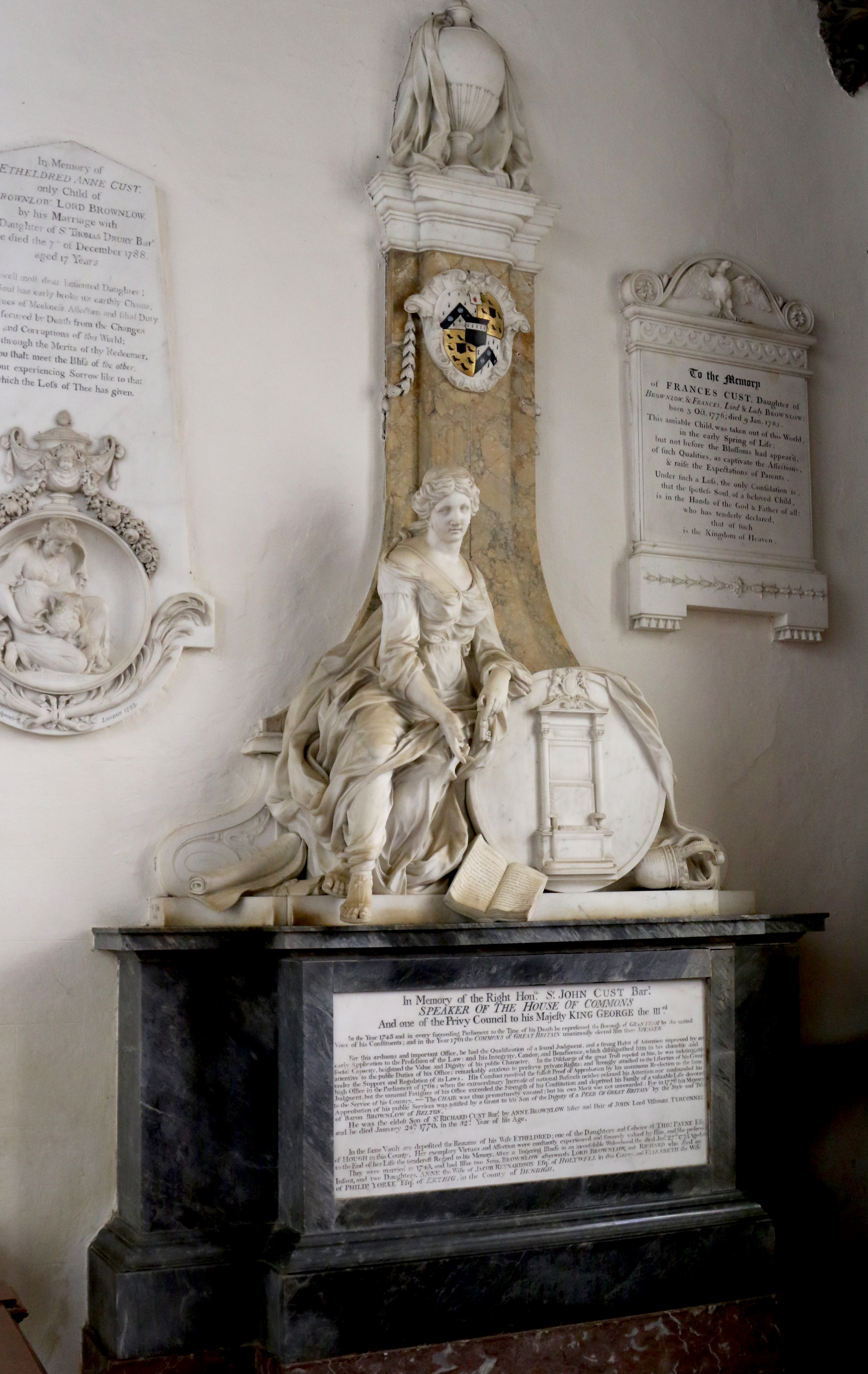
Monument in Belton Church to Sir John Cust, 3rd Baronet by Tyler

Tyler's office was in Vine Street, St James's, London from 1763 to 1784. In 1768 he was one of the three sculptors (the others being Joseph Wilton and Agostino Carlini) who founded the Royal Academy. He was one of the 40 original members and also served as their auditor.

As a sculptor, he produced various monuments, including that to George Lee, 3rd Earl of Lichfield at Spelsbury in Oxfordshire, and one to Sir John Cust, 3rd Baronet of Stamford, Speaker of the House of Commons (1770).

The monument to Thomas Lewis (1690-1777), MP for Radnor in Old Radnor church in 1777.

A monument in York Minster to vice-admiral Henry Medley is also attributed to Tyler.

Tyler also worked with one of his pupils, Robert Ashton, with whom he produced a monument to scholar Dr Martin Folkes.

=== Works ===
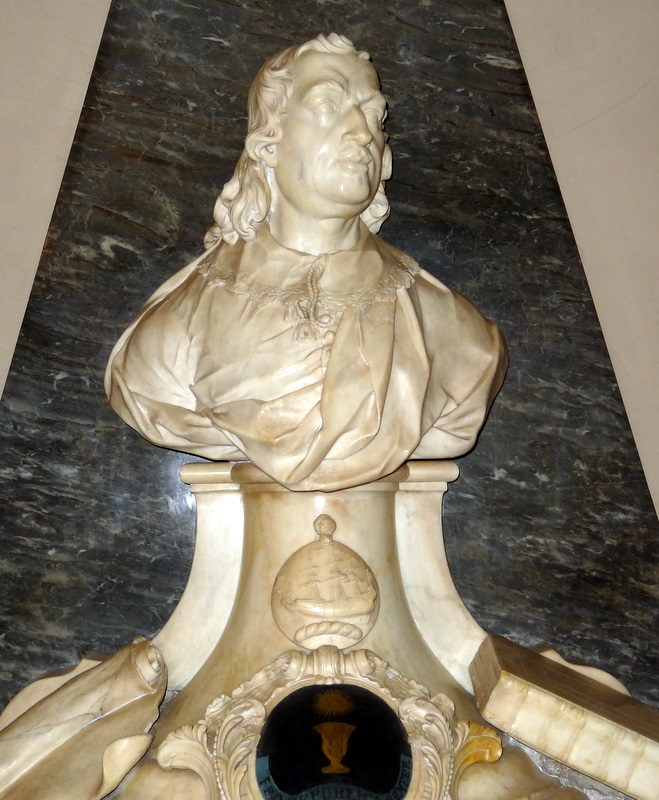
Bust in King's Chapel, Boston

- Memorial with bust to Joseph Smith at Queen's College, Oxford (1756)
- Monument to Thomas Spencer at Guisborough (1759)
- Monument to Francis Gastrell in Oxford Cathedral (1761)
- Monument to Ann Wyndham in Earsham (1762)
- Monument to Thomas Crosfield in Northallerton (1765)
- Memorial with bust to Samuel Vassall in King's Chapel, Boston USA (1766)
- Memorial with bust to Thomas Marriott in Finchingfield (1766)
- Memorial to Thomas Carew in Crowcombe (1766)
- Memorial to Richard Smith in Chichester Cathedral (1767)
- Monument to Charles Holland in Chiswick Parish Church (1769)
- Monument to Sir John Cust, 3rd Baronet in Belton church (1770)
- Memorial to Robert Dinwiddie in Clifton Parish Church (1770)
- Memorial to Thomas Jones (1729-1762) in Southwark Cathedral (1770)
- Monument to Francis Colman in St Mary Abbots in Kensington (1771)
- Monument to George Lee, 3rd Earl of Lichfield in Spelsbury Parish Church (1772)
- Monument to the actor Barton Booth in Westminster Abbey (1772)
- Memorial to Mrs Thomas in Bletchingley (1772)
- Monument to Lady Cust in Belton Church (1772)
- Memorial to the Countess of Rochford in St Osyth, Essex (1773)
- Monument to Anne Yorke in Marchwiel Church (1773)
- Memorial to Dr Zachary Pearce in Westminster Abbey (1774)
- Memorial to General Stringer Lawrence in Westminster Abbey (1775)
- Memorial to General Stringer Lawrence in Dunchideock Church (1775)
- Memorial to Bishop Smyth in Lincoln Cathedral (1775)
- Monument to William Pym in Sandy, Bedfordshire (1775)
- Monument to[Richard Astell in Everton, Bedfordshire (1775)
- Memorial to the Robert Lee, 4th Earl of Lichfield at Spelsbury (1776) to a design by Henry Keene
- Monument to John Harris at Georgeham in Devon ((1776)
- Monument to Sarah Boteler in Eastry, Kent (1777)
- Monument to Thomas Lewis in Old Radnor
- Monument to Charles and Mary Long in Saxmundham (1778)
- Monument to George Perrott in Laleham (1780)
- Memorial to General William Amherst in Sevenoaks, Kent (1781)
- Monument to Beeston Long in Saxmundham (1785)
- Memorial to General Lord Jeffery Amherst in Sevenoaks, Kent (1797)

== Architectural work ==
During the late 18th century, he worked as an architect. His designs included:

- part of London's Freemasons' Hall (1776; with Thomas Sandby)
- the Ordnance office in Westminster (1779–80) demolished 1805
- the Villa Maria – later renamed Gloucester Lodge – in Kensington (c.1800), commissioned by the Duke of Gloucester for his wife, and later the home of George Canning
- Bridport Town Hall in Dorset (1786)
- Dorset County Gaol, Dorchester (c. 1795)

== Royal Academy ==
Tyler was a foundation member of the Royal Academy in 1768. Though nominated to the Royal Academy as an architect, he was usually represented at its exhibitions by busts and low reliefs. He exhibited there between 1869 and 1800, starting with a work described in the catalogue as "a marble bas-relief, an Indian, representing North America, offering the produce of that country to Britannia". In later years he did show some architectural drawings, for the "Garden front of a villa" (1782); Dorchester prison (1784); "a Belvidere to be built in a shrubbery" (1785); "the front of a prison" (1786); Bridport Town Hall (1789) and the "Villa Maria" (1800). His address is given in the catalogues as Vine Street until 1784, Gower Street from 1785, and Caroline Street, Bedford Square in 1800.

He appears to have played a leading in a revolt against Sir Joshua Reynolds over the latter's attempts to have Joseph Bonomi elected a full academician and appointed professor of perspective, a dispute which led to Reynolds' temporary resignation from the academy in 1790. In 1795 Tyler and George Dance, were appointed to examine the accounts of the academy following the resignation of Sir William Chambers. The following year Tyler and Dance became the Academy's first auditors, helping put the institution on a sounder financial footing, for which Tyler was presented with a silver cup in 1799.

Tyler died at his home in Caroline Street, Bedford Square, on 6 September 1801.

== Sources ==
- Hodgson, J. E.; Eaton, Frederick A. (1905). The Royal Academy and its Members 1768–1830. London: John Murray.
