= Elizabeth Hounsell =

British academic and carbohydrate chemist

Elizabeth Fay Hounsell
- Born: 1950
- Died: 24 February 2020 (aged 69–70)
- Occupation: Biochemist

Elizabeth Fay Hounsell (1950 – 24 February 2020) was a British Professor of Biological Chemistry, Birkbeck, University of London. She specialised in the role of protein glycosylation in cell regulation.

== Career ==
The focus of her research was to understand how cell regulation was affected by the addition of sugar residues to proteins and lipids, as a result of glycosylation. One outcome of this work was strategies for drug design through manipulating the structure of proteins and their glycosylations. She developed and made use of mass spectrometry and nuclear magnetic resonance spectroscopy as well as several chromatographic and immunological technologies for her research. As a result, she contributed and edited several books on techniques for analysis of carbohydrate modifications on proteins and lipids. These include Glycoanalysis Protocols, published in 1993 with a second edition in 1998. This provided practical methods for first identifying whether a material was glycosylated and, if so, how to apply a series of standard and also newly developed analytical methods. This structured approach was considered particularly useful for those new to the complexities of glycobiology.

At the start of her career, after gaining her B.Sc. and Ph.D. degrees, Elizabeth Fay Hounsell worked with the synthetic and analytical chemistry of carbohydrates at the (then) Imperial Cancer Research Fund and UK Medical Research Council Clinical Research Centre, Harrow, London from 1977 to 1994. She became part of the Glycoconjugates section developed by Ten Feizi. Technological developments, including by this group, advanced understanding of the order and structure of the sugar residues, called oligosaccharides, attached to cell proteins in health and disease. They analysed gastrointestinal mucins initially because the oligosaccharides were similar to those of cell membranes but mucins were much more readily available in the quantities required for contemporary analytical methods. In addition, mucins were an important part of cellular defences so of interest in their own right. They were able to define the structure of the oligosaccharides including core, constant and variable regions.

Hounsell then moved to University College London, Medical School and Department of Biochemistry and Molecular Biology in 1994, and her research continued to focus on analytical methods. She finally moved to Birkbeck, University of London. Hounsell was Head of School of Chemical and Biological Sciences at Birkbeck, University of London prior to her retirement and continued research as a professor emerita.

Hounsell chaired the Royal Society of Chemistry carbohydrate group 1996-97 and was President of the International Carbohydrate Organisation 2004–06. In 2004 she chaired the 22nd International Carbohydrate Symposium in Glasgow, UK. She was an editor of the scientific journal Carbohydrate Research for over 20 years (1994-2014).

== Publications ==
Hounsell was the author or co-author of over 165 scientific publications and book chapters. They included:

- E F Hounsell, M J Davies and Smith K D (2009) O-linked oligosaccharide profiling by HPLC. In: J M Walker (eds) The Protein Protocols Handbook. Springer Protocols Handbooks. Humana Press, Totowa, NJ.
- Elizabeth F Hounsell and David V Renouf (1998) Oligosaccharide epitope diversity and therapeutic potential. Advances in Experimental Medicine and Biology, Glycoimmunology 2 pp 251–260.
- Glycoanlysis Protocols in Methods in Molecular Biology, editor Elizabeth F. Hounsell, (2nd edition 1998), Humana Press. ISBN 978-0-89603-355-9
- T Feizi, HC Gooi, RA Childs, JK Picard, K Uemura, LM Loomes, SJ Thorpe and EF Hounsell (1984) Tumor-associated and differentiation antigens on the carbohydrate moieties of mucin-type glycoproteins. Biochemical Society Transactions 12 (4) 591-596
- E F Hounsell and T Feizi (1982) Gastrointestinal mucins - structures and antigenicities of their carbohydrate chains in health and disease. Medical Biology 60 (5) 227 - 336
