= Bridport Museum =

Museum in Bridport, Dorset, England

Coordinates: 50.7325°N 2.7579°W

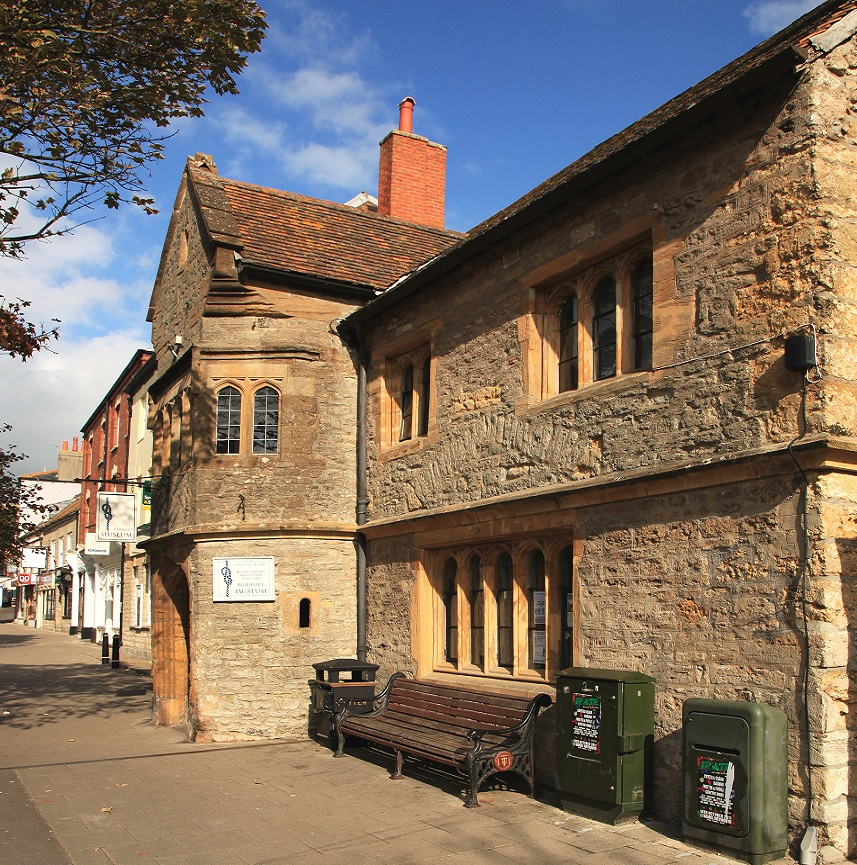
Bridport Museum, seen in 2011.

Bridport Museum is a museum in Bridport, Dorset, England. It is housed within an early 16th-century building known as the Castle, located on South Street. The building has been Grade II* Listed since 1950.

== History ==
The Bridport Museum and Art Gallery was established in 1932 by Captain Alfred Percy Codd, who had purchased the Castle for £1,800 the year before. He offered to donate the building to Bridport Borough Council on the condition that it would be transformed into a museum and art gallery, which would house his own paintings. The council accepted Codd's offer and the museum opened on 28 May 1932.

In 1974, the management of the museum was taken over by West Dorset District Council, and later in 2002 by the Bridport Museum Trust. After years of planning, the museum closed to undergo a £1.3 million redevelopment in 2016. Funding had been received from various sources, including the Heritage Lottery Fund, Bridport Town Council, West Dorset District Council and public donation. It reopened in May 2017 with new galleries and displays, while repair work had been completed on the building.

In October 2026, the museum opened an exhibition of a roughly 10-metre ichthyosaur fossil found on the Dorset coast by Michel and Carine Plissart. The specimen has been dated to about 175 million years ago and was gifted to the museum by the landowner.
