= Symondsbury =

Village and civil parish in Dorset, England

Coordinates: 50°44′22″N 2°47′15″W

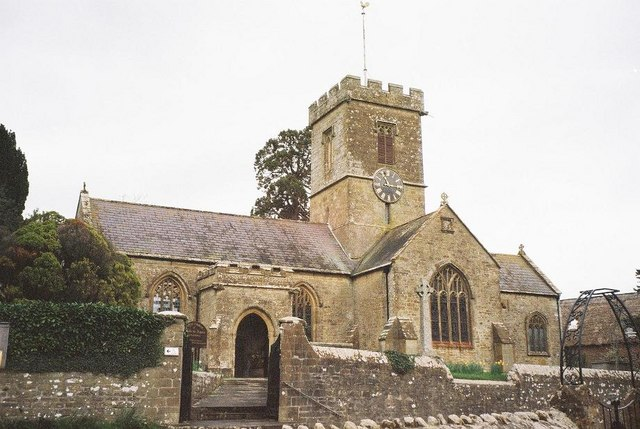
- Parish church of St John the Baptist

- Location within Dorset
- Population: 1,059
- OS grid reference: SY445936
- Unitary authority: Dorset
- Ceremonial county: Dorset
- Region: South West
- Country: England
- Sovereign state: United Kingdom
- Post town: Bridport
- Postcode district: DT6
- Dialling code: 01308
- Police: Dorset
- Fire: Dorset and Wiltshire
- Ambulance: South Western
- UK Parliament: West Dorset

Symondsbury (/ˈsɪməndzbəri/) is a village and civil parish in southwest Dorset, England, 1.5 miles (2.4 km) west of Bridport and 16 miles (26 km) west of Dorchester. The A35 road runs through the parish to the south of the village. The village has a pub (the Ilchester Arms), a pottery and a primary school. Symondsbury parish extends from Eype and West Cliff (West Bay) in the south, to the Marshwood Vale in the north. The village is in the Dorset National Landscape area. In the 2011 census the parish had a population of 1,059.

== Toponymy ==
The name Symondsbury derives from Old English and means the hill or barrow (beorg) belonging to a man named Sigemund. It was listed in the Domesday Book as Simondesberge.

== History and economy ==
Symondsbury is recorded in the Domesday Book as having 31 households, with the lord of the manor being Cerne Abbey, which was also the lord at the time of the Norman Conquest.

In historical times the main economy of the village was the production of flax and hemp for Bridport's rope and net manufacturing trade.

More recently the main business has been milk, beef, sheep, pigs and arable production and, since the decline of agriculture in the late 20th century, the village has hosted two colleges, many small workshops and several large self-catering holiday lets. The village still has several orchards, two cider presses, one apple juice business, an orchard conservation company, artists, potters, an outdoor toddler group and a primary school. Many of the inhabitants still work in the village on the two business parks and other converted agricultural buildings.

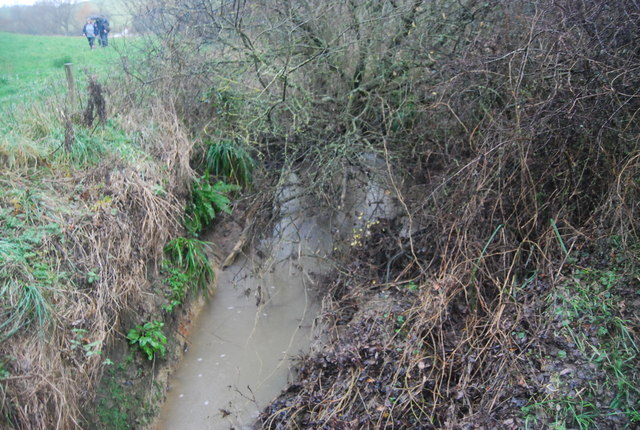
River Simene near Symondsbury

The small River Simene passes through the parish. A tributary stream also wanders through the village itself, coming from a spring that is believed still to have healing properties. In the medieval age, people from miles around came to bathe their eyes, that were then allegedly healed. There is an old road from the sea through the village, that used to take pilgrims to the shrine of St Wite at Whitchurch Canonicorum.

In 2004–05 the Symondsbury Apple Project undertook research into Dorset's orchard and cider history discovering that in Symondsbury parish there were over 100 acres of orchard in 1839.

== Governance ==
For elections to the UK parliament, Symondsbury is in the West Dorset constituency. As of 2024, the Member of Parliament is Edward Morello of the Liberal Democrats.

Symondsbury has two-tiers of local government. At the lower level, Symondsbury is a civil parish governed by a parish council with 8 members. At the upper level, Symondsbury is part of Dorset unitary authority. The parish is in the Bridport electoral ward, which elects 3 of the 82 members of Dorset Council.

Historically, Symondsbury was in Bridport Rural District from 1894 to 1974, and then part of West Dorset district from 1974 to 2019.

== Colmer's Hill ==
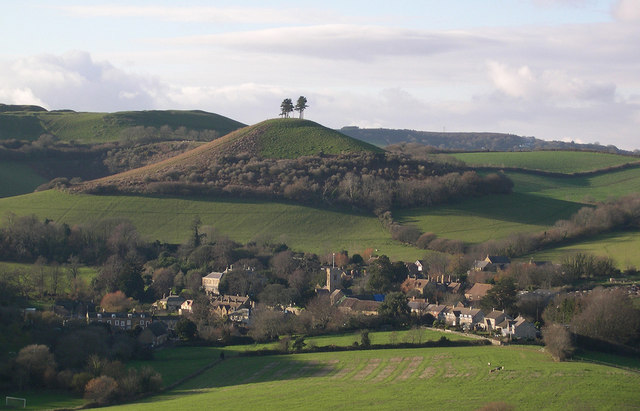
Colmer's Hill above the village

The main landmark in the village is the distinctive Colmer's Hill, a near-conical sandstone eminence topped by pine trees. It is highly visible from the main street in Bridport, and its significance extends back to around the 11th century. The hill takes its name from the "Colmer Tenement". The family were tenants of the Dukes of Somerset and Earls of Ilchester in the 17th and 18th centuries and the Rev. John Colmer was the rector from 1805 to 1806.

During World War I 21 Scots Pine trees were planted on the summit by Major W P Colfox MC in memory of those who had died in battle. In 2006, Sir John Colfox planted some additional Monterey pines. The hill now forms an iconic subject for artists and photographers.

== Church ==
The parish church of St John the Baptist is in Early English style and cruciform shape, it has a nave, transepts, south porch and square tower with six small bells and a clock. The registers date from 1558. Records show that the first rector arrived in 1325. In the north and south transept there are spyholes, known as squints, through which the congregation could see the priest at the altar.

The stained glass in a memorial window in the church was designed around 1884 by William Lethaby, who later became Professor of Ornament & Design at the Royal College of Art.

== Principal houses ==
The principal houses in the village are Symondsbury Manor, Shutes Farmhouse and the Old Rectory (now known as Oakhayes).

Like many so-called manor houses, this one has not formed the administrative centre of the manorial landholding. It was not until the 20th century when the then owners, the Colfox family, had collected together much of the previously manorial land that the house acquired this title. In 1975 the house was separated from the land and sold to Peter Hitchin. Originally a medieval farmhouse, it was heavily remodelled by Crickmay in the late 19th century for the Symonds Udall family to whom Thomas Hardy and William Barnes were regular visitors.

Shutes Farmhouse, originally a medieval hall house, was built from trees felled in 1449. Symondsbury was held by the Abbey of Cerne until dissolution, whence it passed to the Dukes of Somerset and this was the administrative centre of their manorial landholding. In 1672 the Duchess of Somerset, to clear the debts of the late Duke, sold much of Symondsbury in nearly two dozen lots to various tenants, but retained Shutes Farmhouse (the Colmer tenement) as the centre of the residual manorial holding which along with the Lordship were sold shortly afterwards to the Earl of Ilchester whose heir still holds the title, but no land.

Oakhayes was built in two phases at the beginning and end of the 18th century. It was such a rich living that the rector at the time even boasted his own pack of hounds and the kennels can still be seen. An engraving of the house dated 1799 was published in the History of Dorset by John Hutchins.

== Transport ==
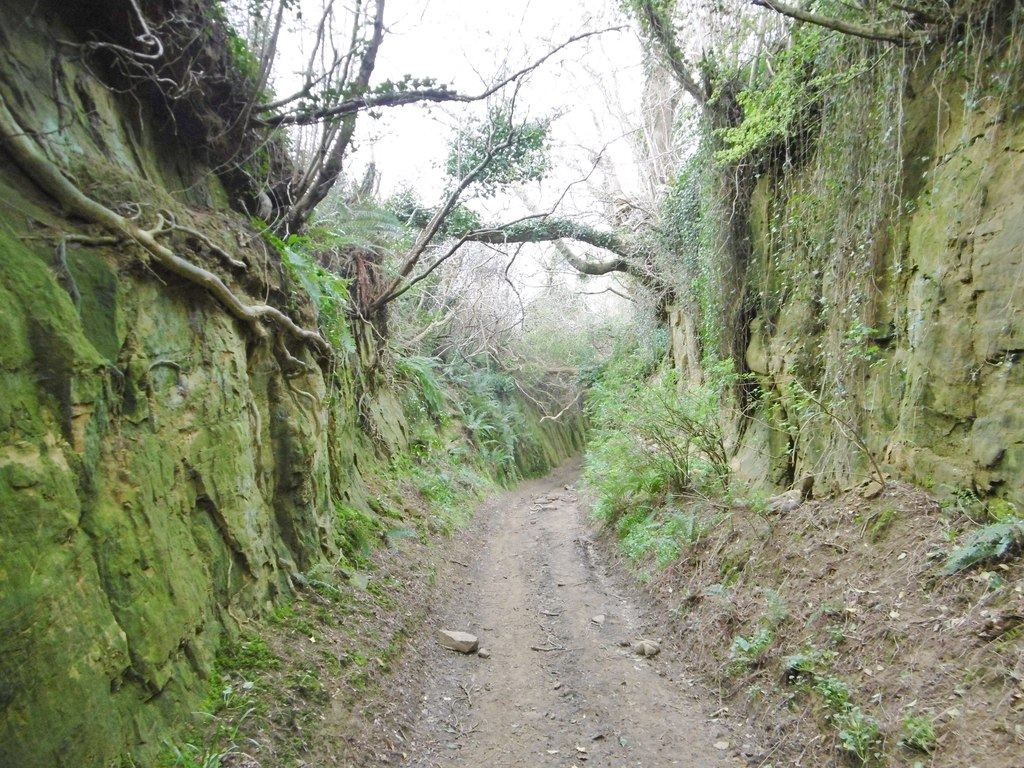
The sunken Hell lane

The village centre is around 600 metres (660 yd) north of the A35 trunk road. There is no bus service through the village, but the X51 Dorchester-Axminster and X53 Weymouth-Axminster services stop on the main road.

Symondsbury has several footpaths into the surrounding area. The nearby sunken lanes Shute's Lane and Hell Lane are a popular local walk.

== Demography ==
In the 2011 census the parish had 581 dwellings, 486 households and a population of 1,059.
