= Bothenhampton =

Village in Dorset, England

Coordinates: 50.7242°N 2.7512°W

Bothenhampton: Bothenhampton
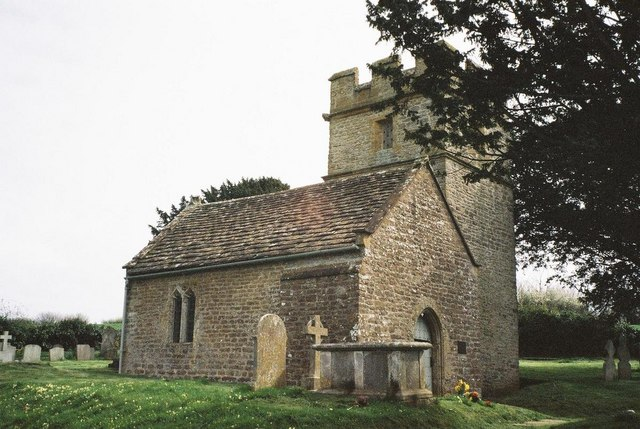
- The old parish church, Bothenhampton

- Location within Dorset
- Population: 2,131
- OS grid reference: SY471919
- Civil parish: Bridport
- Unitary authority: Dorset
- Ceremonial county: Dorset
- Region: South West
- Country: England
- Sovereign state: United Kingdom
- Post town: Bridport
- Postcode district: DT6
- Dialling code: 01308
- Police: Dorset
- Fire: Dorset and Wiltshire
- Ambulance: South Western
- UK Parliament: West Dorset

Bothenhampton is a village in the civil parish of Bridport, in southwest Dorset, England, just outside the town of Bridport. It is separated from the town only by the River Asker and the A35 Bridport by-pass. In the 2011 census the civil parish—which includes the settlement of Walditch—had a population of 2,131.

The parish church, Holy Trinity, was designed by the Arts and Crafts movement architect Edward Schroeder Prior in 1889. It was his first church. By the late 19th century the 15th century Old Holy Trinity Church had fallen into disrepair. There are 2 Commonwealth War Graves in the old churchyard. The new church was funded by J. P. F. Gundry, one of the directors of the West Bay Building Company, by public subscription and anonymous donation. The roof is the most radical feature of the church. The arches spring at 2’6 above floor level and rise to a ridge 30’ high. The windows are filled with a forerunner of Prior's Early English glass. The altar table and furnishings were designed by another leading Arts and Crafts Movement architect, William Lethaby, as was the altar front with its intertwined wild roses, leaves and stems.

At the end of the village is the village park, which is a memorial to John Holt. Annual events, such as a barn dance organised by the Bothenhampton village hall committee, take place in the John Holt play area.

In 1801 the population was 334 and in 1901 this was still only 423. New houses were built between the 1st and 2nd world wars and there was a lot of building in the 1960s. By 1980 the population had grown to approx 1200 and by 2001 it had become 2186. By 2001 11% of Bothenhampton's population were aged under 16, 42% were aged between 16 and 59 and 47% were aged 60 and over.

The civil parish and parish council were abolished with effect from 1 April 2024, with the parish area taken into Bridport.
