= Hugh de Burdet I =

Anglo-Norman nobleman

Hugh de Burdet
- Lord of Lowesby
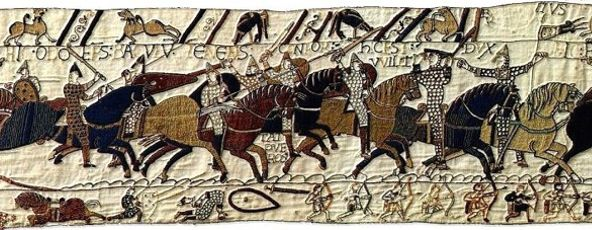
- Companions of William the Conqueror fighting at the Battle of Hastings as shown in the Bayeux Tapestry
- Tenure: c.1076 – 1091
- Predecessor: Waltheof, Earl of Northumbria (before 1066)
- Successor: William de Burdet I
- Born: c.1045 Cully, Duchy of Normandy
- Died: c.1091 Lowesby, Kingdom of England
- Wars and battles: Norman Conquest: Battle of Hastings
- Issue: William de Burdet I

Hugh de Burdet I (c.1045 – c.1091), also listed as Burdett, Bordet, Bourdet, or de Cuilly was a Norman knight, landowner, and companion of William the Conqueror during the Norman Conquest, specifically at the Battle of Hastings in 1066. Burdet's name appears on the Falaise Roll, the Dives-sur-Mer Roll, and the Battle Abbey Roll as a knight accompanying William the Conqueror. Burdet was later ennobled as part of the Anglo-Norman nobility and appointed as a vassal and sub-tenant in the service of both Judith of Lens and Hugh de Grandmesnil. The Domesday Book in 1086 lists Burdet as owning considerable amounts of land in the county of Leicestershire.

== Biography ==
Burdet was born around 1045 in Cully, Calvados in the Duchy of Normandy, he was the son of Robert I Burdet. Burdet's father Robert was the lord of Cully and part of the broader Norman nobility in Calvados near Falaise. The source Domesday People: Domesday Book by Katharine Keats-Rohan written in 1999 lists Hugh as a tenant in Rabodanges. Burdet is known to have one brother, Robert Burdet II, the two brothers were both Norman noblemen. The broader Burdet family were the Barons of Cully in Normandy and held land in Rabodanges, Putanges-le-Lac, and Orne from the Grandmesnil family and were tenants of Hugh de Grandmesnil. Burdet was related to Robert d'Aguiló (born Robert Bordet) who later took part in the Iberian Crusades and Reconquista, eventually becoming the Prince of Tarragona.

Burdet was a knight under William the Conqueror, the Duke of Normandy, and is listed in several sources as being one of his companions during the Norman Invasion at the Battle of Hastings. Burdet's name is listed as Hugue Bourdet (companion 246) on the Dives-sur-Mer Roll and Burdett on the Battle Abbey Roll at Battle Abbey in Battle, East Sussex which is a commemorative list noting each of William the Conqueror's knights and noblemen.

Following the Norman Conquest Burdet was appointed as a vassal and tenant of Judith of Lens, the niece of William the Conqueror, as well as Hugh de Grandmesnil in Leicestershire. Judith's husband was Waltheof, Earl of Northumbria who was executed in 1076 after leading two revolts. Following Waltheof's execution Judith appointed Burdet as her vassal and sub-tenant. Hugh would end up holding a total of six manors throughout Judith's lands in and around Leicestershire, primarily in Lowesby. According to the Domesday Book in 1089 Burdet was titled as the owner of lands in Braunstone, Gaulby, Lowesby, Rearsby, Sysonby, and Welby and paid taxes to Judith of Lens who was the regions tenant-in-chief. Burdet's land and resources included 6 carucate (also called ploughlands), 2 lord's plough teams, 5 men's plough teams, 24 acres of meadow land, one woodland, and one gristmill.

Burdet's son, Robert Burdet, eventually inherited his fathers estates in Lowesby. The Burdet family eventually became ardent supporters of Burton Lazars and the Order of Saint Lazarus. Burdet is reported to have died around 1091, one of Burdet's descendants is Member of Parliament William Burdet, who also owned considerable estates in Lowesby. The Colley family, lineal male ancestors of the Wellesley's is said to descend from Hugh according to the Battle Abbey roll.
