= Burdett baronets of Bramcote (1619) =

Escutcheon of the Burdett baronets of Bramcote

The Burdett baronetcy, of Bramcote in the County of Warwick, was created in the Baronetage of England on 25 February 1619 (Burke in 1949 says 1618) for Thomas Burdett, High Sheriff of Derbyshire from 1610 to 1611.

The 1st Baronet's son, Francis, the 2nd Baronet, was High Sheriff of Derbyshire for 1649. He was succeeded by his son, Robert, the 3rd Baronet, who sat as Member of Parliament for Warwickshire and Lichfield.

His grandson, Robert, the 4th Baronet, succeeded at birth in May 1716, four months after the death of his grandfather. He represented Tamworth in the House of Commons. On his death in 1797 the title passed to his grandson, Francis, the 5th Baronet, who was a prominent reformist politician. Burdett married Sophia, daughter of the wealthy banker Thomas Coutts. He was succeeded by his only son, Robert, the 6th Baronet. He served as High Sheriff of Derbyshire in 1848. He died unmarried in 1880 and was succeeded by his first cousin, Francis, the 7th Baronet. He was the son of William Jones Burdett, younger brother of the 5th Baronet. He was High Sheriff of Surrey in 1880 and was succeeded by his son from his second marriage, Francis, the 8th Baronet.

On the death in 1951 of the 8th Baronet, the baronetcy became dormant. It is now extinct, not appearing on the Official Roll. The seat of the Burdett family was Foremarke Hall, Derbyshire.

== Burdett baronets, of Bramcote (1618) ==
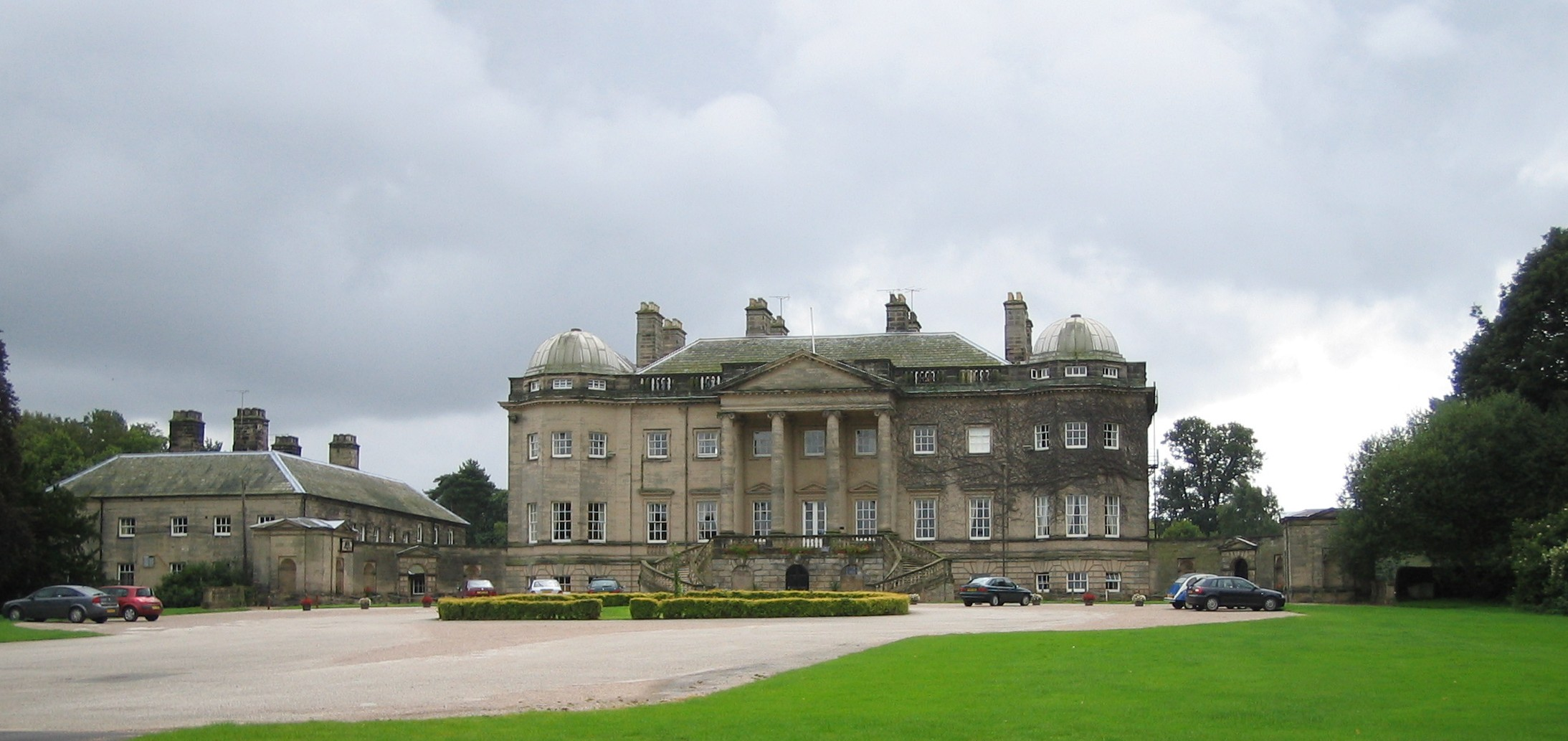
Foremarke Hall, former seat of the Burdett baronets of Bramcote

- Sir Thomas Burdett, 1st Baronet, of Bramcote (1585–c.1647)
- Sir Francis Burdett, 2nd Baronet (1608–1696)
- Sir Robert Burdett, 3rd Baronet (1640–1716)
- Sir Robert Burdett, 4th Baronet (1716–1797)
- Sir Francis Burdett, 5th Baronet (1770–1844)
- Sir Robert Burdett, 6th Baronet (1796–1880)
- Sir Francis Burdett, 7th Baronet (1813–1892)
- Sir Francis Burdett, 8th Baronet (1869–1951)

Burdett baronets, of Bramcott, and Baroness Burdett-Coutts
- Sir Thomas Burdett of Bramcott, 1st Baronet (1585—1647)
  - Sir Francis Burdett, 2nd Baronet (1608—1696)
    - Sir Robert Burdett, 3rd Baronet (1640—1715/6)
      - Robert Burdett (died 1716)
        - Sir Robert Burdett, 4th Baronet (1716—1797)
          - Francis Burdett (1743—1794)
            - Sir Francis Burdett, 5th Baronet (1770—1844)
              - Sir Robert Burdett, 6th Baronet (1796—1880)
              - Angela Georgina Burdett-Coutts, 1st Baroness Burdett-Coutts (1814—1906)
            - William Jones Burdett (c. 1772—1840)
              - Lt.-Col. Sir Francis Burdett, 7th Baronet (1813—1892)
                - Sir Francis Burdett, 8th Baronet (1869—1951)

== Extended family ==
The philanthropist Angela Burdett-Coutts, 1st Baroness Burdett-Coutts, was the youngest daughter of the 5th Baronet.

== Bramcote manor ==
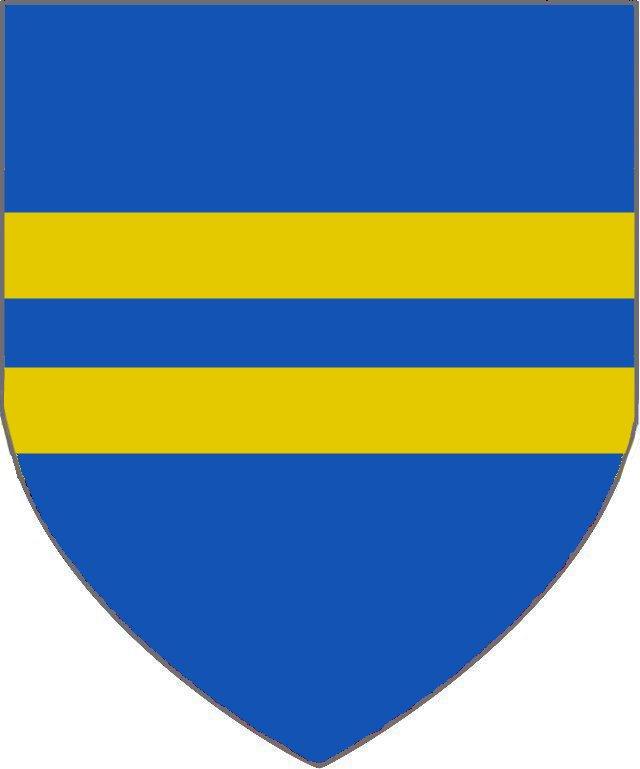
Arms of Burdett of Bramcote: Azure, two bars or (arms of their ancestor Sir William Burdet (died pre-1309) of Lowesby in Leicestershire)

The 1st Baronet was a descendant of Robert Burdet, who had a grant of free warren in Seckington, Warwickshire in 1327. His son and heir Robert was born there in 1345. The manor then followed the descent of Bramcote in this family, until 1919, when the 8th Baronet sold the estate in lots. The manorial rights, attached to Seckington Hall Farm, were bought by Harry Arnold.

== Notes ==
Baronetage of England
Preceded by Leigh baronets	Burdett baronets 25 February 1619	Succeeded by Morton baronets
