= Knightley =

Knightley may refer to:

== People ==
- Sir Charles Knightley, 2nd Baronet (1781–1864), English politician, father of Rainald
- Charles Knightley (cricketer) (born 1972), English cricketer
- John Knightley (disambiguation), multiple people
  - John Knightley (MP), English politician
- Louisa Knightley (1842–1913), British Anglican and women's rights activist, wife of Rainald
- Lucy Knightley (1742–1791), English politician
- Keira Knightley (born 1985), English actress
- Philip Knightley, English politician
- Phillip Knightley (1929–2016), Australian journalist
- Rainald Knightley, 1st Baron Knightley (1819–1895), English politician
- Richard Knightley (1533–1615), English politician
- Steve Knightley (born 1954), English singer-songwriter and musician
- Thomas Knightley (1824–1905), English architect
- Valentine Knightley (disambiguation), multiple people
  - Valentine Knightley (died 1618), English politician and landowner
- Will Knightley (born 1946), English actor, father of Keira
- William Knightley-Smith (1932–1962), English cricketer

== Fictional characters ==
- George Knightley, the hero of Jane Austen's novel Emma

== Places ==
- Knightley, Staffordshire, a hamlet in England.
