= Clement Throckmorton =

Clement Throckmorton may refer to:

- Clement Throckmorton (died 1573) (c. 1512–1573), English landowner and Member of Parliament
- Clement Throckmorton (MP for Warwickshire), English politician who sat in the House of Commons between 1624 and 1626
- Clement Throckmorton (died 1663) (1630–1663), English politician who sat in the House of Commons variously between 1656 and 1663
