= Robert Burdett =

Robert Burdett may refer to:

- Robert Bordet (d.abt.1159), Lord of Cullei & Prince of Tarragona & cousin to the Burdets of Loseby, Huncote & Seckington
- Robert Burdet (Warks MP 1320) (d.1333), MP for Warwickshire and Leicestershire
- Robert Burdett (died 1549), MP for Leicester, Leicestershire and Warwickshire
- Robert Burdett (died 1692), British American legislator and deacon
- Robert Burdett (fl. 1601), MP for Tamworth (UK Parliament constituency)
- Sir Robert Burdett, 3rd Baronet (1640–1716), English MP for Warwickshire 1679–1681 and Lichfield 1689–1698
- Sir Robert Burdett, 4th Baronet (1716–1797), his grandson, English MP for Tamworth 1748–1768

== See also ==
- Robert Jones Burdette (1844–1914), American humorist and clergyman
