= John Catesby (disambiguation) =

John Catesby was a British judge.

John Catesby may also refer to:

- John Catesby (MP for Warwickshire) (died 1405), MP for Warwickshire
- John Catesby (MP for Northamptonshire), MP for Northamptonshire (UK Parliament constituency) in 1425 and 1429
