= Roger Smart (disambiguation) =

Roger Smart (born 1943) is a former footballer.

Roger Smart may also refer to:

- Roger Smart (MP) (fl.1404), MP for Warwickshire
- Roger Smart (Microsoap)
