= Thomas Lucy =

Politician and magistrate in 16th-century England

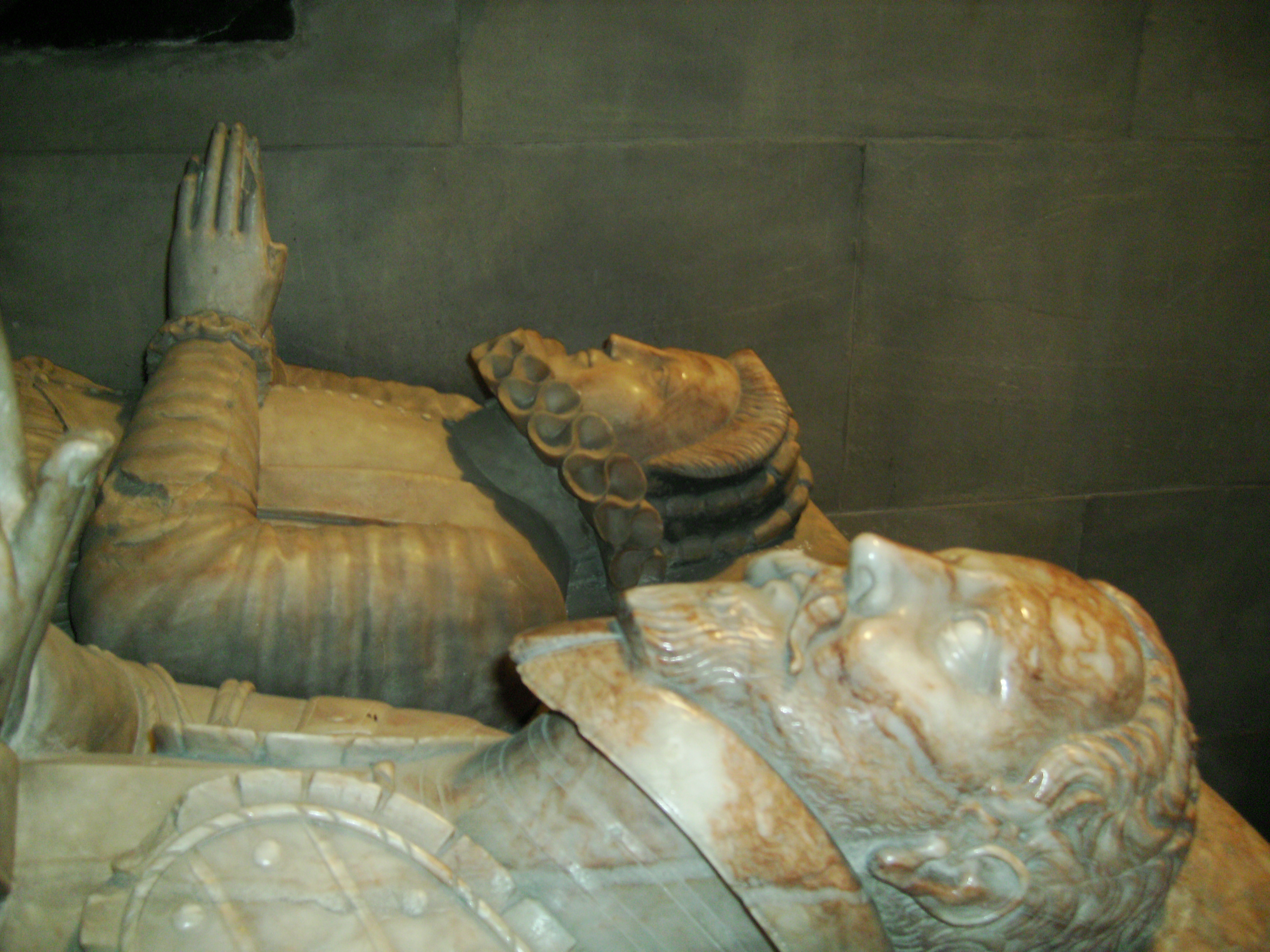
Effigies of Sir Thomas Lucy and his wife, Joyce Acton, St. Leonard's church, Charlecote

Sir Thomas Lucy (24 April 1532 – 7 July 1600) was an English politician who sat in the House of Commons in 1571 and 1585. He was a magistrate in Warwickshire, but is best known for his links to William Shakespeare. As a Protestant activist, he came into conflict with Shakespeare's Catholic relatives, and there are stories that the young Shakespeare himself had clashes with him.

== Early life ==
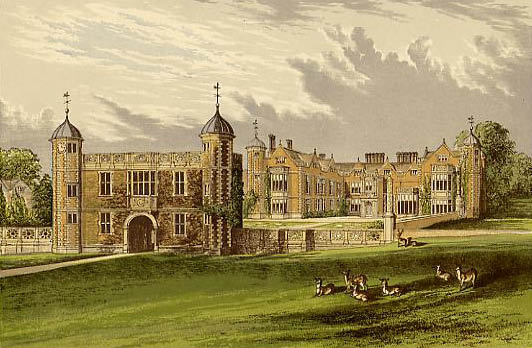
Charlecote Park circa 1880

Thomas Lucy was the eldest son and heir of William Lucy (died 1551) of Charlecote near Stratford-on-Avon, Warwickshire, and Anne Fermer, the daughter of Richard Fermer of Easton Neston, Northamptonshire. His paternal grandparents were Sir Thomas Lucy (died 1525) and Elizabeth Empson, the daughter of Richard Empson, one of Henry VII's chief ministers. The family were descended from the Anglo-Norman de Lucy family.

On his father's death, Lucy inherited Sherborne and Hampton Lucy in addition to the house of Charlecote Park, which was rebuilt for him in red brick by John of Padua, known as John Thorpe, about 1558. Through his marriage he also inherited Sutton Park in Worcestershire.

In 1565, he was knighted by the queen's favourite, Robert Dudley, 1st Earl of Leicester, at the queen's behest.

In 1571, Lucy was elected Member of Parliament for Warwickshire. Queen Elizabeth herself visited Charlecote Park in 1572.

== Protestant activist ==
Lucy was a loyal supporter of Queen Elizabeth and an ardent Protestant. John Foxe, who had witnessed the persecution of Protestants under Queen Mary, had been briefly a tutor in the Lucy household in around 1547. Following the plot by John Somerville against the life of Queen Elizabeth in 1582, and the arrest of Edward Arden as a conspirator, Lucy raided homes of the Arden family to whom Shakespeare was related. Lucy also arrested and interrogated Catholic families in the area after the missionary activities of the Jesuit, Edmund Campion.

In 1584, there was a dispute between Ananias Nason, one of Lucy's servants, and Hamnet Sadler, a friend of Shakespeare. Lucy arbitrated in the matter. Lucy was re-elected MP for Warwickshire in 1585, and in 1586 he became high sheriff of the county.

He often appeared at Stratford-upon-Avon as justice of the peace and as commissioner of musters for the county. As a justice of the peace, he showed great zeal against Catholics and took his share in the arrest of Edward Arden in 1583.

== Shakespeare ==
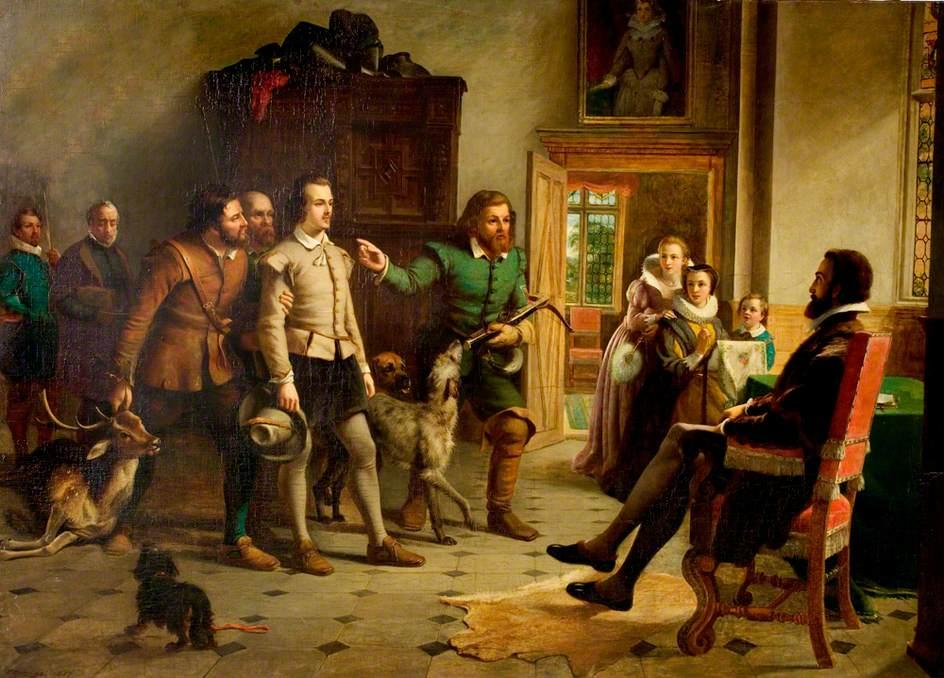
Shakespeare Before Thomas Lucy by Thomas Brooks, a typical Victorian portrayal of the poaching story

According to tradition, the young Shakespeare wrote a lampoon of Lucy at some point in the mid-1580s. This either led to an attempt to prosecute him or to his prudent departure from the area. There are versions of a local ballad mocking Lucy's name and another suggesting his wife was unfaithful. Both were written down by collectors in the late 17th century. The former turns "Lucy" into "lousy",

A parliament member, a justice of peace,
At home a poor scarecrow, at London an ass,
If lousy is Lucy as some folks miscall it
Then Lucy is lousy whatever befall it.

Edmond Malone noted a different ballad seemingly ridiculing Lucy's marriage, which was still being sung in Stratford c. 1687–90 when Joshua Barnes heard it and wrote it down. There is no evidence that Shakespeare wrote either ballad.

=== Poaching ===
Another story, first recorded by Richard Davies in the late 17th century, is that the young Shakespeare was involved in poaching from Lucy's estate. Lucy was at the time noted for his effort in preservation of game, for which he had introduced a bill into Parliament in 1585. Davies wrote, "Shakespeare was much given to all unluckiness in stealing venison and rabbits, particularly from Sir –– Lucy who oft had him whipped and sometimes imprisoned and at last mad[e] him fly his native country to his great advancement." The story was also related by Shakespeare's first biographer, Nicholas Rowe, who links it to the ballad:

For this he was prosecuted by that Gentleman, as he thought, somewhat too severely; and in order to revenge that ill Usage, he made a Ballad upon him. And tho' this, probably the first Essay of his Poetry, be lost, yet it is said to have been so very bitter, that it redoubled the Prosecution against him to that degree, that he was oblig'd to leave his Business and Family in Warwickshire, for some time, and shelter himself in London.

There are no surviving legal records to prove or disprove the poaching incident or the ballad incident. The poaching story became popular in the Victorian period, appearing in many illustrations and paintings. In 1834 Walter Savage Landor published Citation and Examination of William Shakespeare, one of his "Imaginary Conversations", which is presented as the record of Shakespeare's examination by Lucy. Lucy is portrayed as a "mildly pretentious" figure, "longing for the good old days when classes knew their place".

The story has been objected to on the grounds that there were no deer being kept in Charlecote until after Shakespeare's death. Edmond Malone wrote that Lucy did not own a park at this time and that it would have been illegal to keep deer outside a licensed deer park. John Semple Smart and Edgar Innes Fripp also tried to disprove the story by arguing that Lucy could not have kept deer in the 1580s. Samuel Schoenbaum, however, noted that Lucy had a "free warren", which would have supported rabbits, hares, pheasants and other birds, along with larger animals—which could have included roe-deer.

=== Justice Shallow as satire of Lucy ===
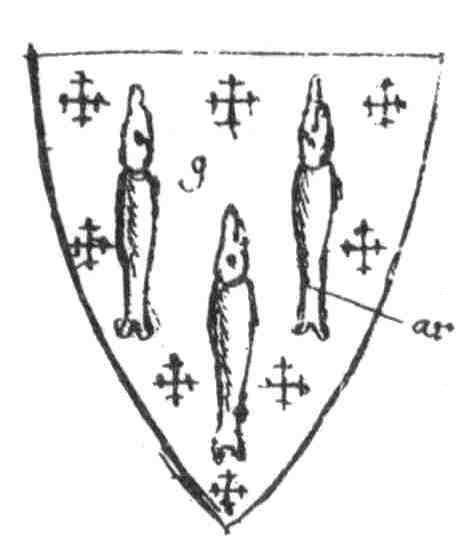
Thomas Lucy's coat of arms, depicting "luces" (pike), from William Dugdale's Antiquities of Warwickshire

Shakespeare is sometimes thought to have satirised Lucy with the character of Justice Shallow, who appears in Henry IV, Part 2 and The Merry Wives of Windsor. The latter play seems to contain jokes about Lucy's name similar to the "lousy" ballad, when Shallow and his dim-witted relative Slender discuss the "luces" (pike) in their coat of arms, which unintentionally becomes literally lice-ridden when this is misinterpreted as a "dozen white louses". Lucy's coat of arms contained "luces". The theory dates back to c. 1688–1700, as part of Davies's comments that Lucy "oft had him whipped and sometimes imprisoned". He goes on, "his revenge is so great that he [Lucy] is his Justice Clodpate [i.e. Shallow], and calls him a great man and that in allusion to his name bore three louses rampant for his Arms".

Samuel Schoenbaum says that a direct parody of Lucy is unlikely. Schoenbaum asks why Shakespeare would risk offending "well placed friends of a man who had done the state some service". The fact that the evidence for the alleged parody of Lucy is confined to the Merry Wives suggests that the character was not invented with Lucy in mind. Certainly "Lucy was, in physical form, social condition and personality, nothing like Shallow" as described in Henry IV, Part 2. Leslie Hotson argues that the satire in Merry Wives is not directed at Lucy, but at William Gardiner, a corrupt Justice of the Peace whose coat of arms also contained luces, though Shakespeare may have remembered the luces/louses pun from anti-Lucy jokes in Stratford. Shakespeare had come into conflict with Gardiner during the latter's attempts to close the Swan Theatre

== Family ==
Lucy married Joyce Acton, daughter of Thomas Acton of Sutton, Worcestershire. Their daughter Anne married Sir Edward Aston of Tixall. She was the mother of the diplomat Walter Aston, 1st Lord Aston of Forfar. Lucy's son, also called Thomas, married twice and had many children. In 1600, there was a major local scandal involving one of Lucy's granddaughters, who eloped with one of the family servants. Lucy died in the midst of this humiliating incident. His son inherited the estate. His grandson Thomas was also an MP for Warwickshire.

== Notes ==
Parliament of England
Preceded by Walter Haddon; John Butler	Member of Parliament for Warwickshire; 1571; With: John Husband	Succeeded by Sir William Devereux; Clement Throckmorton
Preceded by Sir William Devereux; Clement Throckmorton	Member of Parliament for Warwickshire; 1585; With: George Digby	Succeeded by Sir John Harington; Fulke Greville
