= Knightly =

Knightly may refer to:

- Knight, a person granted an honorary title of knighthood
  - Knightly Piety, a specific strand of Christian belief espoused by knights during the Middle Ages
  - Knightly sword, a straight, double-edged weapon with a single-handed, cruciform hilt and a blade length of about 70 to 80 centimetres
- Knightly Chetwood (1650–1720), Anglican priest, poet, and translator

== See also ==
- Knightley (disambiguation)
