= John Bagot (Staffordshire MP) =

English politician

Sir John Bagot (c. 1358–c. 1437) was an English politician. He sat as MP for Staffordshire in 1391, January 1397, September 1397, 1401, October 1404, 1407, 1411 and May 1421 and Sheriff of Staffordshire from 6 November 1413 till 10 November 1414 and 15 January till 12 December 1426.

He was knighted by Michaelmas 1379.

== Offices held ==
He also served as commissioner of inquiry concerning theft of merchandise bound for Calais in Staffordshire in July and November 1384, in Derbyshire, Leicestershire and Staffordshire in July 1394, in Staffordshire in July 1394, in Sussex in December 1413, concerning concealments in Staffordshire in July 1419; commissioner of array in December 1399, September 1403 and March 1419; commissioner to suppress treasonous rumours in May 1402; commissioner of arrest in Staffordshire and Shropshire in May 1407; commissioner to raise a royal loan in Staffordshire in November 1409, January 1420, March 1430 and March 1431.

He also served as controller of a tax in Staffordshire in March 1404; justice of the peace of Staffordshire from 8 February 1406 till February 1407, and 4 December 1417 till his death; escheator of Staffordshire from 9 November 1406 till 2 November 1407; deputy captain of Calais for Sir Thomas Beaufort from 20 June 1408 till 1409; and ambassador to treat for a truce with the Duke of Burgundy on 30 May 1409 and 29 November 1410.

== Family ==
He was the son and heir of Sir Ralph Bagot (died by 1376) by Elizabeth Blithfield. He was probably the half-brother of Sir William Bagot. By c. 1388, he married Beatrice, the daughter of Sir Anketin Mallory (died 1393) and they had one son.
