= Thomas Archer (MP for Warwickshire) =

English politician

Thomas Archer (ca. 1619 – 1685) was an English politician who sat in the House of Commons in 1659 and 1660. He fought in the Parliamentary army in the English Civil War.

== Life ==
Archer was the eldest surviving son of Sir Simon Archer of Umberslade Hall in Tanworth in Arden, Warwickshire and his wife by Anne Ferrers, daughter of Sir John Ferrers of Tamworth Castle, Staffordshire. He was baptised on 14 January 1619.

Archer served as a Parliamentary Colonel during the English Civil War. In 1659, he was elected Member of Parliament for Warwick in the Third Protectorate Parliament. He was elected MP for Warwickshire in April 1660 for the Convention Parliament.

Archer died at the age of about 66 and was buried at the Church of St Mary Magdalene, Tanworth-in-Arden on 25 October 1685.

== Family ==
Archer married Anne Lye daughter of Richard Lye or Leigh, merchant of London by 1650, They had three sons and two daughters. His eldest son and heir was Andrew Archer and his second son was Thomas Archer, the architect and courtier. Of his other children, Leigh died unmarried, Elizabeth married Sir Herbert Croft, 1st Baronet, and Frances (1657 -1715) married first Sir Francis Rouse, 3rd Baronet (d. 1678) and subsequently John Chaplin of Tathwell, Lincs.

Parliament of England
Vacant Unrepresented in Rump Parliament Title last held by Richard Lucy; Joseph Hawkesworth	Member of Parliament for Warwickshire; 1660; With: George Browne	Succeeded by Sir Robert Holte; Sir Henry Puckering
