= William Burdet =

13th-century English politician

Sir William Burdet
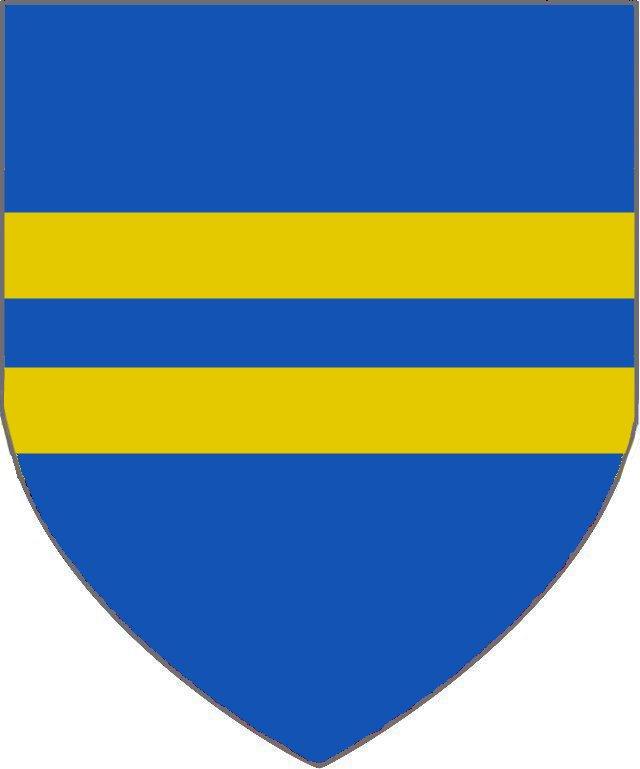
- Arms of William Burdet of Lowesby: Azure, two bars or

Member of Parliament

Knight of the Shire for Leicestershire
- In office 6 Oct 1297 – 14 Oct 1297
- Monarch: Edward I

Personal details
- Died: bef. 8 Mar 1309
- Children: John Burdet

Sir William Burdet (died pre-1309) of Lowesby in Leicestershire, England, was a Member of Parliament for the county seat of Leicestershire.

== Career and Life ==
The Burdet family had been dedicated supporters of the Order of St Lazarus's English headquarters at Burton Lazars since its earliest days but relations soured in 1294 when the Order appropriated the tithes to Lowesby parish for themselves. This was not popular with the villagers and sporadic riots broke out over the following few years. The vicar was excommunicated and in 1297 the churchyard was "polluted by bloodshed" by the actions of Sir William Burdet. The dispute was resolved in 1298 when William agreed to pay for the reconsecration of the church and to reconfirm his family's former grants to the Order of St Lazarus but the former good relationship was never re-established.

Sir William was summoned to Parliament in London on 6 Oct 1297 shortly after the disastrous defeat at the Battle of Stirling Bridge and was mustered for service in the Scottish Wars on 24 Oct 1299.

Sir William died before 8 Mar 1309 when his Inquisition post mortem was held to distribute his estate.

He held lands at Branteston, Huncote, Friseby, Galby, Loseby, Stretton and Norton in Leicestershire and at Maidford, Northamptonshire.

== Progeny ==
He had at least one son:

- John Burdet (b. 1290)

His lands soon passed to other members of the Burdet family. His nephew Sir Robert Burdet was a Member of Parliament for Warwickshire.

== Bibliography ==
- Harleian (1929). The Knights of Edward I. Vol. I. London: Harleian Society.
- Marcombe, David (2003). Leper Knights. Woodbridge: Boydell Press. ISBN 1-84383-067-1.
- Nichols, John (1795). The History and Antiquities of the County of Leicester. Leicester: John Nichols.
- Parliamentary Writs. Vol. I. London: Public Record Office. 1827.
