= William Catesby (disambiguation) =

William Catesby may refer to:

- William Catesby (died 1478), English landowner and MP for Northamptonshire, 1449, 1453
- William Catesby (1450–1485), English landowner and MP for Northamptonshire, 1484
- William Catesby, High Sheriff of Warwickshire in 1371
- William Catesby (died 1383), MP and father of John Catesby (MP for Warwickshire)
