= Moulins en Bessin =

- Commune
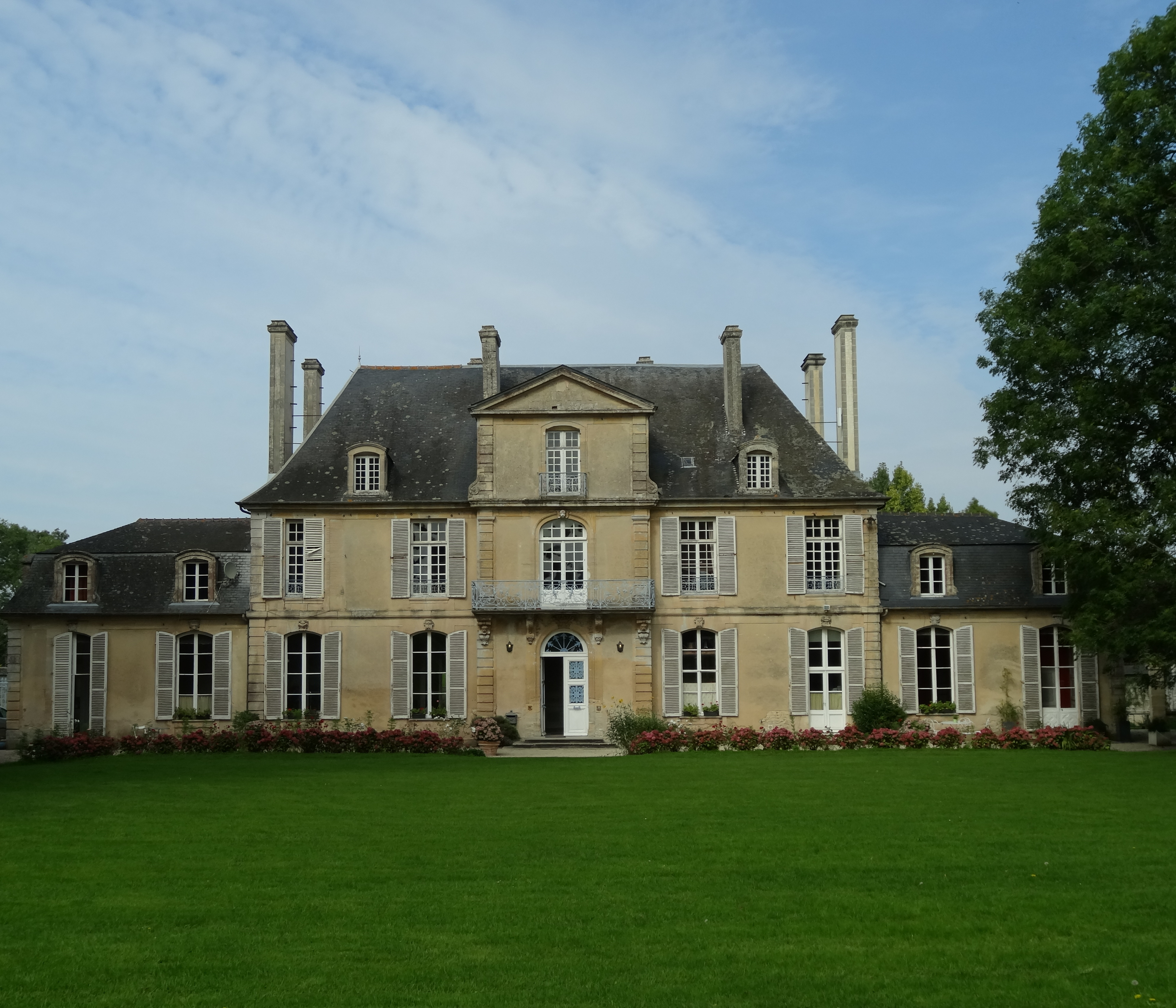
- The chateau in Martragny
- Location of Moulins en Bessin
- Location within France Location within Normandy
- Coordinates: 49°15′07″N 0°35′46″W
- Country: France
- Region: Normandy
- Department: Calvados
- Arrondissement: Bayeux
- Canton: Thue et Mue
- Intercommunality: CC Seulles Terre Mer
- Area^{1}: 17.30 km^{2} (6.68 sq mi)
- Population (2023): 1,125
  - Density: 65.03/km^{2} (168.4/sq mi)
- Time zone: UTC+01:00 (CET)
  - Summer (DST): UTC+02:00 (CEST)
- INSEE/Postal code: 14406 /14740
- ^{1} French Land Register data, which excludes lakes, ponds, glaciers > 1 km^{2} (0.386 sq mi or 247 acres) and river estuaries.

Moulins en Bessin is a commune in the department of Calvados, northwestern France. The municipality was established on 1 January 2017 by merger of the former communes of Martragny (the seat), Coulombs, Cully and Rucqueville.

== See also ==
- Communes of the Calvados department
