= Thomas Leigh, 1st Baron Leigh =

English politician

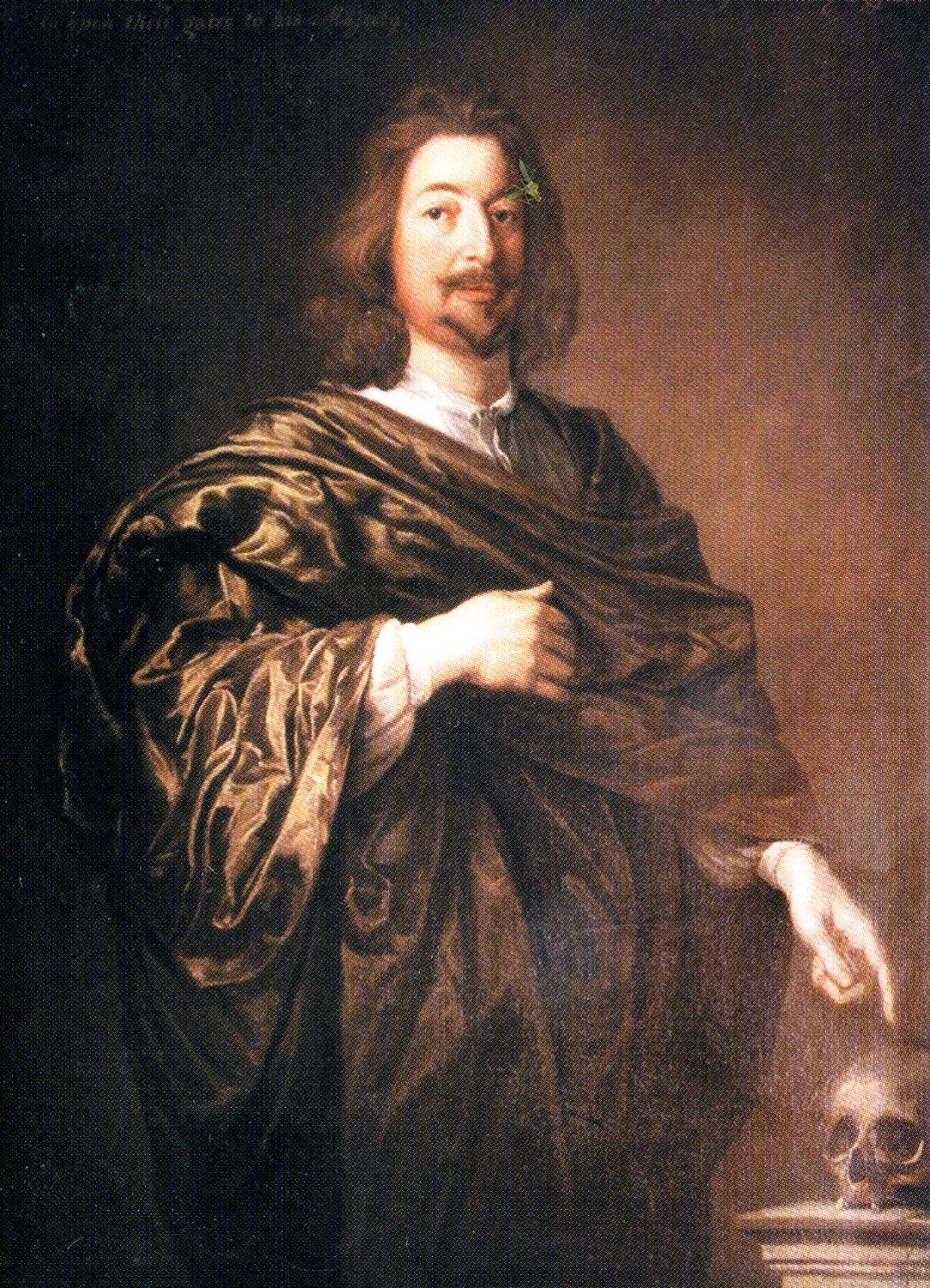
Leigh

Thomas Leigh, 1st Baron Leigh (1595 – 22 February 1672) was an English politician who sat in the House of Commons from 1628 to 1629. He supported the Royalist cause in the English Civil War and was created a baron in 1643.

Leigh was the son of Sir John Leigh and his first wife Ursula Hoddesdon, daughter of Sir Christopher Hoddesdon, of Leighton Buzzard, Bedfordshire. He matriculated at Magdalen College, Oxford, under entry dated 4 November 1608, aged 13. He succeeded to the baronetcy on the death of his grandfather, Sir Thomas Leigh, 1st Baronet, of Stoneleigh, Warwickshire on 1 February 1626. In 1628, he was elected member of parliament for Warwickshire and sat until 1629 when King Charles decided to rule without parliament for eleven years. He was Sheriff of Warwickshire from 1636 to 1637.

During the Civil War, Leigh showed intrepid loyalty to the king whom he entertained at Stoneleigh when the gates of Coventry were shut against him. He was created Baron Leigh of Stoneleigh on 1 July 1643.

In 1644 his aunt Alice, wife of Robert Dudley, famous explorer and (titular) Duke of Northumberland (title recognized in the Holy Roman Empire but not in England) as son of Robert Dudley, 1st Earl of Leicester, was recognized the title of Duchess of Dudley.

Leigh died at the age of about 77.

Leigh married in about 1615 Mary Egerton, daughter of Sir Thomas Egerton, who was the son of Thomas Egerton, 1st Viscount Brackley, and his wife Elizabeth Venables. Leigh and Mary had at least seven children, five sons and two daughters. Thomas, the eldest son, predeceased his father, and the title passed to the eldest grandson, also named Thomas.

Parliament of England
Preceded by Sir Thomas Lucy; Sir Clement Throckmorton	Member of Parliament for Warwickshire; 1628–1629; With: Sir Thomas Lucy	Parliament suspended until 1640
Peerage of England
New creation	Baron Leigh; 1643–1672	Succeeded by Thomas Leigh
Baronetage of England
Preceded by Thomas Leigh	Baronet (of Stoneleigh); 1626–1672	Succeeded by Thomas Leigh
