= John Knightley =

John Knightley may refer to:

- John Knightley (Emma)
- John Knightley (MP) for Warwickshire
- Sir John Knightley, 1st Baronet (c. 1611–c. 1670) of the Knightley baronets
- Sir John Knightley, 2nd Baronet (died 1689) of the Knightley baronets
- Sir John Knightley, 1st Baronet (1747–1812) of the Knightley baronets
