= William Mountfort (MP) =

Member of the Parliament of England

Sir William Mountfort (died 6 December 1452) was an English MP.

He was the second son of Sir Baldwin Mountfort of Coleshill-in-Arden, Warwickshire who he jointly succeeded with his brother Edmund after the disinheritance of their elder brother Baldwin. He was knighted in 1417.

He held a number of commissions in both Warwickshire and neighbouring counties. He was a steward of the household of Richard, Earl of Warwick and was in Normandy during 1417-1418.

He was appointed deputy sheriff of Worcestershire by Richard, Earl of Warwick for 1423–1424 and by the guardians of Richard's son Earl Henry for 1440–1441. He was appointed High Sheriff of Warwickshire and Leicestershire for 1431–32, 1441–42 and 1450–51 and was Captain of Honfleur, Normandy during 1438.

He was elected to Parliament as the MP for Warwickshire in 1410 and returned a further seven times until 1450.

He was married twice:firstly Margaret or Margery, the daughter and heiress of Sir John Pecche of Hampton in Arden, with whom he had 6 sons and 2 daughters and secondly Joan, the daughter of William Alderwich of Aldridge, Staffordshire and the widow of William Brokesby of Shoby, Leicestershire, with whom he had a further son, Edmund.
