= Martragny =

- Part of Moulins en Bessin
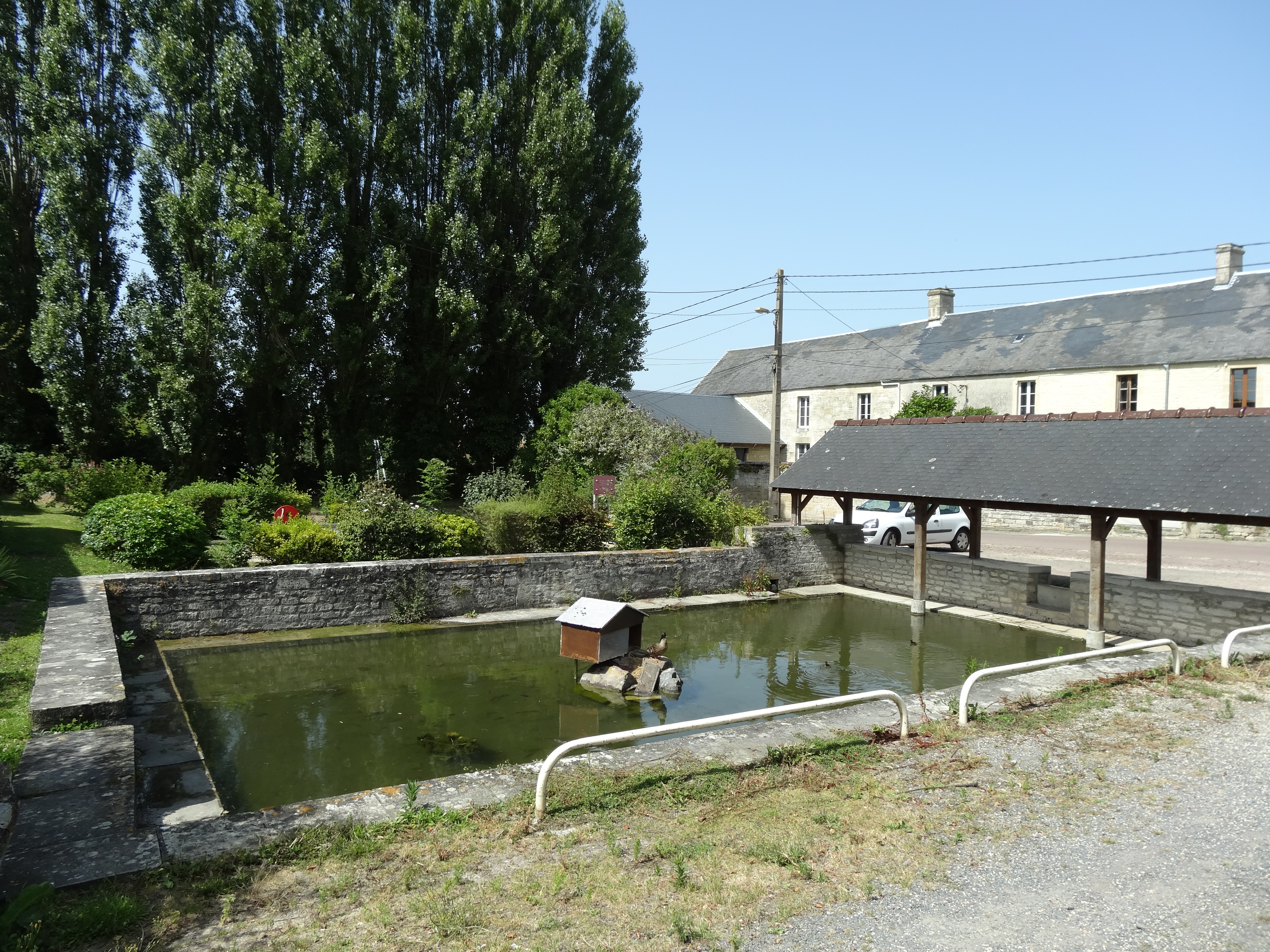
- Location of Martragny
- Location within France Location within Normandy
- Coordinates: 49°15′06″N 0°35′45″W
- Country: France
- Region: Normandy
- Department: Calvados
- Arrondissement: Bayeux
- Canton: Thue et Mue
- Commune: Moulins en Bessin
- Area^{1}: 3.69 km^{2} (1.42 sq mi)
- Elevation: 72 m (236 ft)
- Highest elevation: 82 m (269 ft)
- Lowest elevation: 43 m (141 ft)
- Population (2018): 361
  - Density: 97.8/km^{2} (253/sq mi)
- Time zone: UTC+01:00 (CET)
  - Summer (DST): UTC+02:00 (CEST)
- Postal code: 14740
- ^{1} French Land Register data, which excludes lakes, ponds, glaciers > 1 km^{2} (0.386 sq mi or 247 acres) and river estuaries.

Martragny (French pronunciation: [maʁtʁaɲi]) was a former commune in the Calvados department in the Normandy region of northwestern France. On 1 January 2017, it was merged into the new commune of Moulins en Bessin.

== See also ==
- Communes of the Calvados department
