= William Wigston (MP) =

16th-century English politician

Sir William Wigston (by 1509 – 27 September 1577) was an English politician.

He was the eldest son of Roger Wigston of Leicestershire and probably educated at the Inner Temple. He succeeded his father in 1542 and was knighted on 19 October 1553.

He was escheator for Warwickshire and Leicestershire for 1544–45 and a justice of the peace for Warwickshire from 1547 to his death and for Leicestershire from 1547 to 1553. he was appointed High Sheriff of Warwickshire and Leicestershire for 1551–52 and 1557–58. He was the Recorder for Warwick from 1554 to 1572.

He was elected a member (MP) of the Parliament of England for Leicester in 1539 and Warwickshire in April 1554, November 1554 and 1555.

He died in 1577 and was buried at Wolston. He had married Elizabeth, the daughter of Sir Robert Peyton of Isleham, Cambridgeshire and had 4 sons and 7 daughters. Duried his lifetime he had purchased Belgrave in Leicestershire and Pinley and Wolston in Warwickshire.
