= Roger Smart (MP) =

English politician

Roger Smart or Smert' (fl. 1404) of Kenilworth, Warwickshire, was an English politician.

He was a member (MP) of the parliament of England for Warwickshire in January 1404.

Parliament of England
Preceded by Sir William Bagot; Sir Alfred Trussell	Member of Parliament for Warwickshire; 1404; With: Roger Hugford	Succeeded by Thomas Crewe; Thomas Raleigh
