= Rucqueville =

- Part of Moulins en Bessin
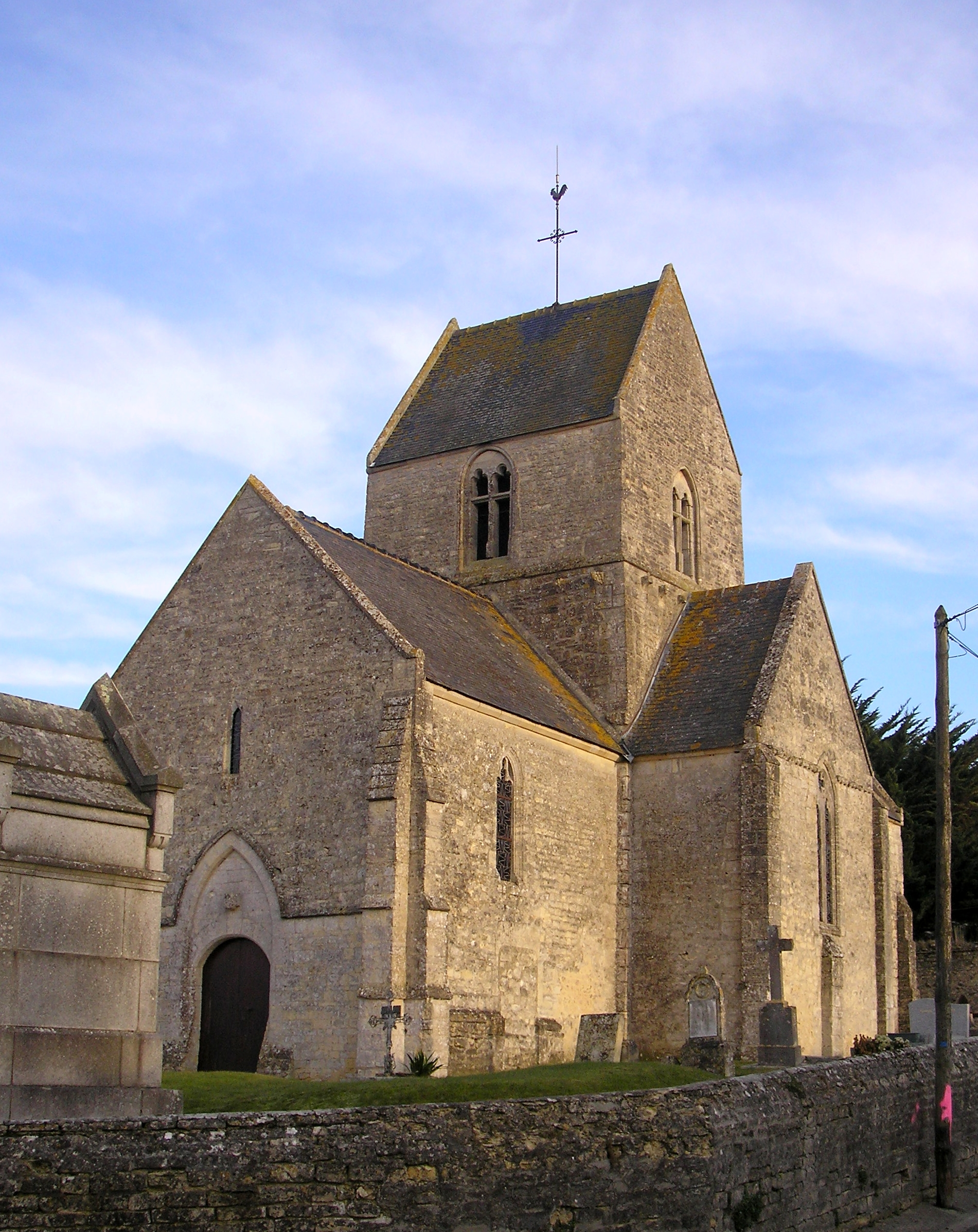
- Location of Rucqueville
- Location within France Location within Normandy
- Coordinates: 49°15′26″N 0°34′57″W
- Country: France
- Region: Normandy
- Department: Calvados
- Arrondissement: Bayeux
- Canton: Thue et Mue
- Commune: Moulins en Bessin
- Area^{1}: 2.63 km^{2} (1.02 sq mi)
- Elevation: 58 m (190 ft)
- Highest elevation: 73 m (240 ft)
- Lowest elevation: 32 m (105 ft)
- Population (2018): 166
  - Density: 63.1/km^{2} (163/sq mi)
- Time zone: UTC+01:00 (CET)
  - Summer (DST): UTC+02:00 (CEST)
- Postal code: 14480
- ^{1} French Land Register data, which excludes lakes, ponds, glaciers > 1 km^{2} (0.386 sq mi or 247 acres) and river estuaries.

Rucqueville (French pronunciation: [ʁykvil]) is a former commune in the Calvados department in the Normandy region in northwestern France. On 1 January 2017, it was merged into the new commune Moulins en Bessin.

== See also ==
- Communes of the Calvados department
