= Robert Burdett (died 1549) =

English politician

Robert Burdett (by 1510 – 11 January 1549), of Bramcote, Warwickshire, was an English politician.

He was a member (MP) of the parliament of England for Leicester in 1542, Leicestershire in 1545 and Warwickshire in 1547.
