= Cully, Calvados =

Cully
- Part of Moulins en Bessin
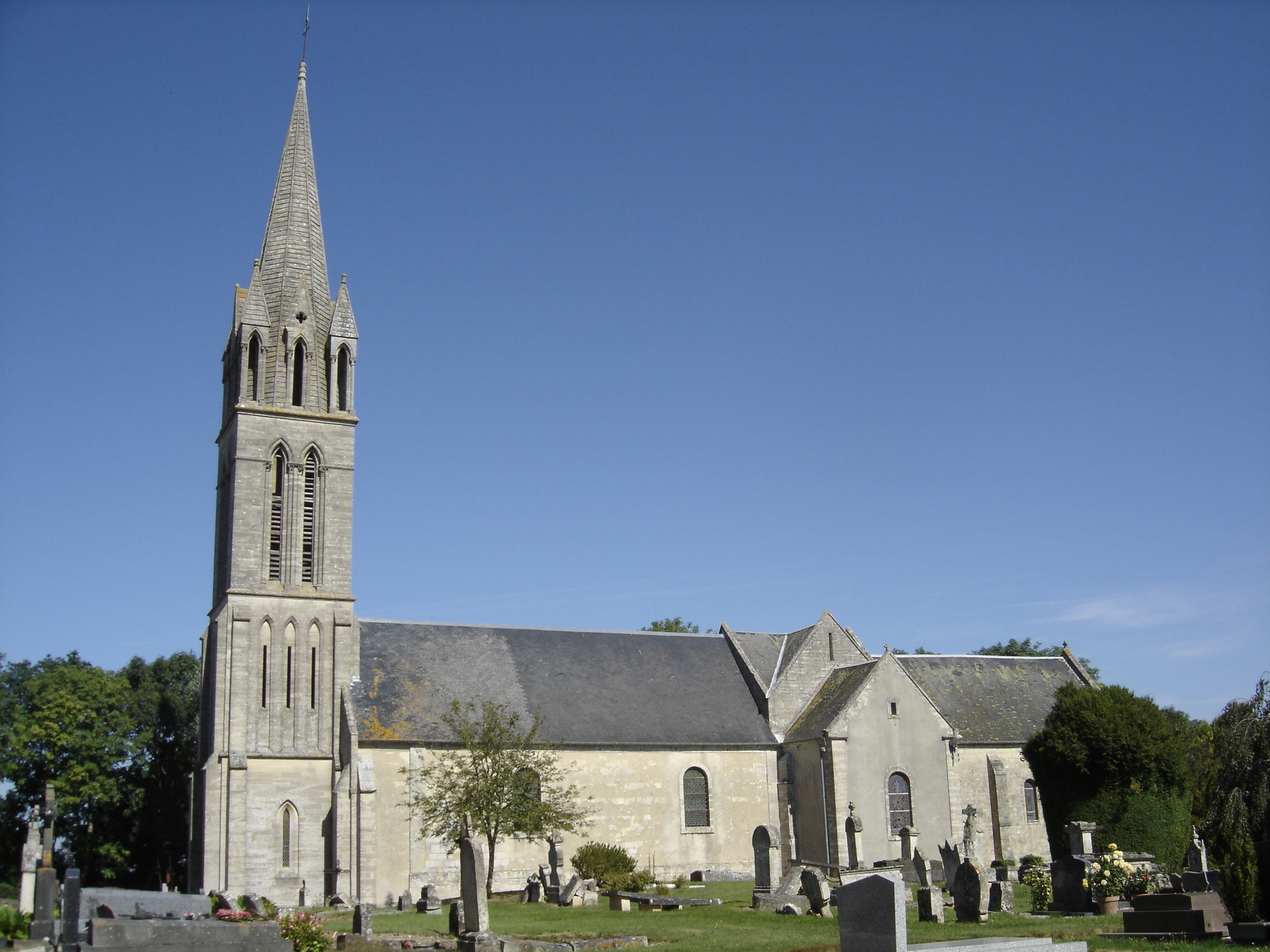
- Location of Cully
- Location within France Location within Normandy
- Coordinates: 49°15′03″N 0°31′57″W
- Country: France
- Region: Normandy
- Department: Calvados
- Arrondissement: Bayeux
- Canton: Thue et Mue
- Commune: Moulins en Bessin
- Area^{1}: 6.55 km^{2} (2.53 sq mi)
- Elevation: 45 m (148 ft)
- Highest elevation: 67 m (220 ft)
- Lowest elevation: 19 m (62 ft)
- Population (2018): 157
  - Density: 24.0/km^{2} (62.1/sq mi)
- Time zone: UTC+01:00 (CET)
  - Summer (DST): UTC+02:00 (CEST)
- Postal code: 14480
- ^{1} French Land Register data, which excludes lakes, ponds, glaciers > 1 km^{2} (0.386 sq mi or 247 acres) and river estuaries.

Cully is a former commune in the Calvados department in the Normandy region in northwestern France. On 1 January 2017, it was merged into the new commune Moulins en Bessin.

== See also ==
- Communes of the Calvados department
