= Clement Throckmorton (MP for Warwickshire) =

English politician

Sir Clement Throckmorton was an English politician who sat in the House of Commons between 1624 and 1626.

Throckmorton was the son of Job Throckmorton of Haseley Warwickshire and his wife Dorothy Vernon, daughter of Thomas Vernon of Howell, Staffordshire. He was awarded the B.A. from Queen's College, Oxford, having been allowed to count eight terms at Cambridge University. He was a student of the Inner Temple in 1600. In 1624, Throckmorton was elected Member of Parliament for Warwickshire. He was re-elected MP for Warwickshire in 1625 and 1626. He was, according to Dugdale, "not a little eminent for his learning and eloquence".

Throckmorton married Lettice Fisher, daughter of Sir Clement Fisher of Packington, Warwickshire and was the father of Job and Clement.

Parliament of England
Preceded by Sir Thomas Lucy; Sir Francis Leigh	Member of Parliament for Warwickshire; 1624–1626; With: Sir Thomas Lucy	Succeeded by Sir Thomas Lucy; Sir Thomas Leigh, 2nd Baronet
