= George Browne (died 1661) =

English politician

Sir George Browne (died 1661) was an English politician who sat in the House of Commons in 1660.

Browne was the son of William Browne of Radford Semele, Warwickshire. He was admitted to Gray's Inn in February 1619.

In April 1660, Browne was elected Member of Parliament for Warwickshire in the Convention Parliament. He was knighted on 30 June 1660.

Browne died early in 1661.when the manors of Leamington and Radford Semele passed to his relative Elizabeth Throckmorton, wife of Sir William Throckmorton.

Browne married Mary Littleton, daughter of Sir Edward Littleton, 1st Baronet in 1636 when his father settled on him the manor of Leamington, with view of frank-pledge, and a water-mill. Following his death, she married Sir Robert Fisher, Bt.
