= John Catesby (MP for Warwickshire) =

John Catesby (died 1404/5), of Ashby St Ledgers, Northamptonshire and Ladbroke, Warwickshire, was an English Member of Parliament (MP).

He was a Member of the Parliament of England for Warwickshire in 1372 and 1393.

Catesby was the son and heir of MP, William Catesby.

Catesby seems to have died in the winter of 1404–5. His estates were divided amongst his heirs, his three sons: William, John and Robert.

Parliament of England
Preceded by William Bagot; Guy Spyne	Member of Parliament for Warwickshire; 1393; With: William Bagot	Succeeded by William Bagot; Thomas Burdet
