= Lowesby =

Coordinates: 52.66°N 0.931944°W

- Location within Leicestershire
- Area: 2.22 sq mi (5.7 km^{2})
- Population: 127 (2011)
  - Density: 57/sq mi (22/km^{2})
- OS grid reference: SK725075
  - London: 90 mi (140 km)
- District: Harborough
- Shire county: Leicestershire
- Region: East Midlands
- Country: England
- Sovereign state: United Kingdom
- Post town: Leicester
- Postcode district: LE7
- Police: Leicestershire
- Fire: Leicestershire
- Ambulance: East Midlands
- UK Parliament: Rutland and Stamford

Lowesby is a small parish and township situated in the district of Harborough in Leicestershire. It is 8 miles east of the county capital, Leicester, and 90 miles north of London.

== Geography ==
Lowesby parish is located 500 feet (150 metres) above sea level in a relatively hilly region. Other than Queniborough brook there are no other sites of topographic interest in Lowesby, partially due to the intensive farming in the area. Local farming may have been influenced by the geology of the area which is predominantly Lower Jurassic Mudstones and minor carbonates.

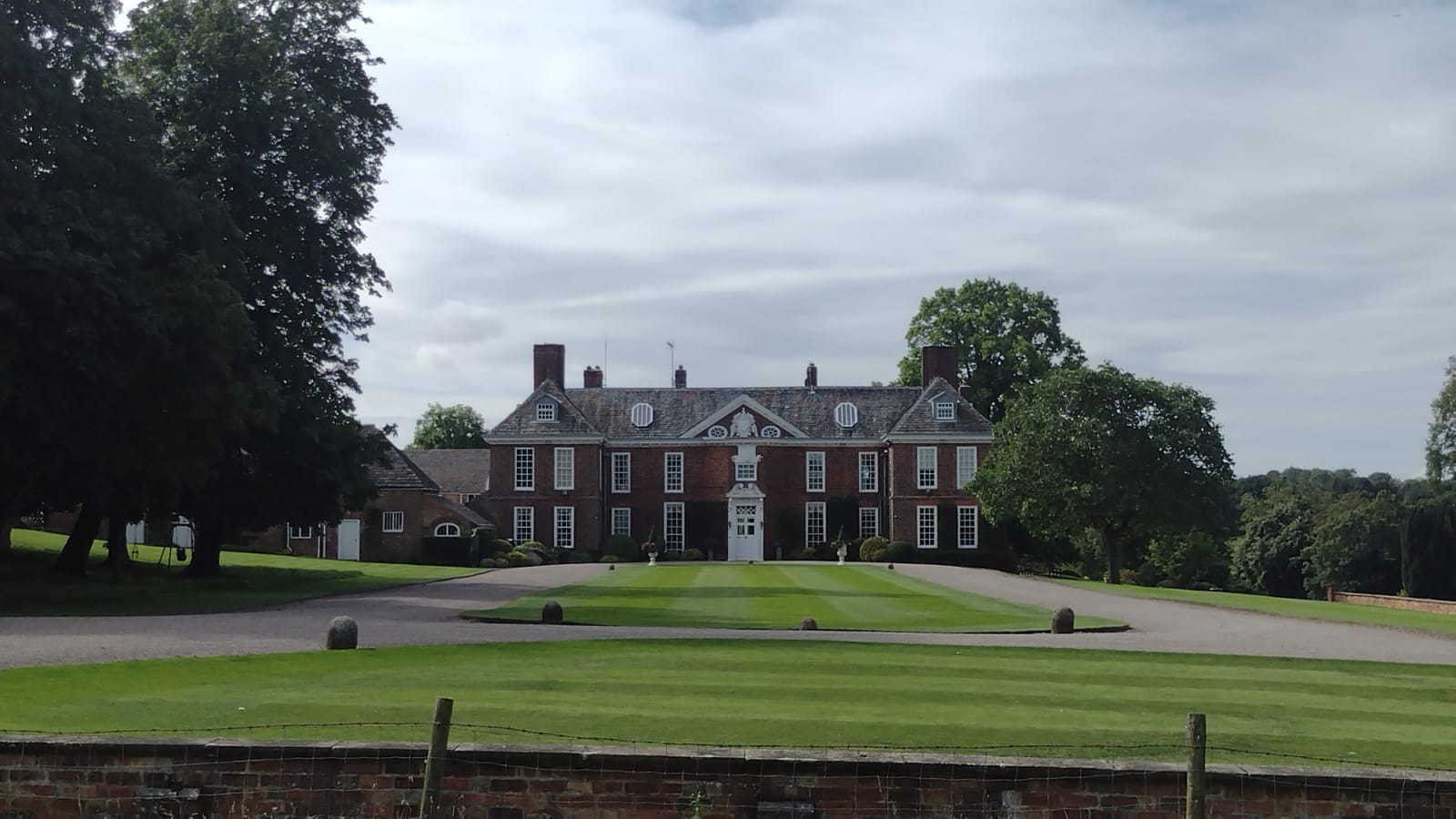
Lowesby Hall from the North East, August 2023

Lowesby Hall was first owned by Richard Wallaston from the mid 17th century and remained in his family until Anne Wallaston married into the Fowke family, in whose hands the Hall remained well into the 20th century. It is now under private ownership.

== Governance ==
The Rutland and Melton District, which includes Lowesby, is represented by Alicia Kearns (Conservative), who has held the seat since 2019. The councillor for Harborough is Michael Rook (Conservative), who was elected in May 2007. The county councillor for Lowesby is Simon Galton (Liberal Democrat).

== History ==
The name Lowesby stems from Old Norse and is thought to mean Lausi's farm or settlement, which refers to the owner and subsequent land use. The manor of Lowesby is recorded in the Domesday Book of 1086 as containing two plough teams consisting of five men each. The manor was held from Countess Judith, a niece of William the Conqueror, by a Norman named Hugh Burdet (or Bourdet/Bordet), originally from Cuilly in Normandy, who made Loseby his seat for many generations.

The Burdets founded Loseby parish church and gave its advowson to the Order of St Lazarus based at Burton Lazars which they supported for many generations until relations soured in about 1290 when the Order started to appropriate part of the parish's tithes. Riots broke out over the ensuing years, Loseby's vicar was excommunicated and William Burdet's actions "polluted" the churchyard by bloodshed in 1297. Gradually calm was restored to the parish and in 1298 Sir William Burdet agreed to pay for the reconsecration of the church and reconfirmed his family's grants to the Order but relations were never the same again.

Occupations in Lowesby in 1831, males aged 20 and over:
1. Farmers employing Labourers (26.6%)
2. Agricultural Labourers (40.6%)
3. Manufacturing (7.81%)
4. Retail & Handicrafts (4.69%)
5. Capitalists, Professionals (9.38%)
6. Labourers (non-agricultural) (3.12%)
7. Servants (7.81%)

In 1831 agriculture was by far the most prominent industry, with two-thirds of the male population of the age of 20 employed in this sector. However, fifty years later, this number had dropped to 40%, and while agriculture was still the most common employment, the remainder of the population was working in other occupations, including as coachmen, gardeners for the manor, or as machinists.

The parish's main land use in 2001 is still farming but just 9% of the population now work in agriculture and the manor no longer provides employment.

== Transport ==
Lowesby railway station has been closed since 7 December 1953, and is now part of a farm. It was the first station to open on the Great Northern Railway route to Leicester on 15 May 1882.

== Economy ==
The tertiary sector, otherwise described as the service sector, is the dominant area of employment in Lowesby with 62% (50 people) of the population working in this area. There has also been a movement into scientific and technical industries, which employs 10% of those working in tertiary industry in Lowesby.

== Demography ==
Historical population
Year	Pop.	±%
1801	147	—
1811	190	+29.3%
1821	217	+14.2%
1831	231	+6.5%
1841	220	−4.8%
1851	243	+10.5%
1881	142	−41.6%
1891	136	−4.2%
1901	107	−21.3%
1911	147	+37.4%
1921	118	−19.7%
1931	135	+14.4%
1951	133	−1.5%
1961	93	−30.1%
2011	127	+36.6%

The population of Lowesby Parish was 127 in 2011. This level of population has not always been constant throughout the parish's history. The population of Lowesby grew by almost 100 people during the first fifty years of the 19th century. By the time of the 1851 census, a UK-wide railway network had almost been completed. Coupled with minor depressions and a second phase of British industrialisation, it may have led to a decline in the local population. The population has not recovered since then, with Lowesby having averaged approximately one hundred inhabitants during the 20th century.
