= Valentine Knightley =

Valentine Knightley may refer to:

- Valentine Knightley (died 1618) (c.1555–1618), MP for Tavistock and Northampton
- Valentine Knightley (MP) (1718–1754), High Sheriff of Northamptonshire, 1743; MP for Northamptonshire, 1748–1754
- Sir Valentine Knightley, 4th Baronet (1812–1898), of the Knightley Baronets
