= Robert Burdet (Warks MP 1320) =

Member of Parliament for Warwickshire and was Sheriff of Warwickshire

Sir Robert Burdet
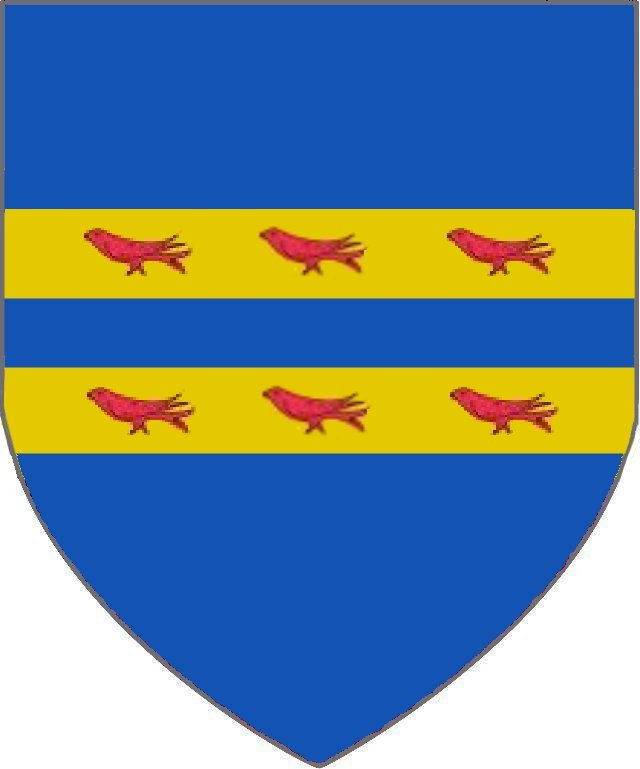
- Arms of Robert Burdet: Azure, two bars or each charged with three martlets gules (Note: the martlets were a difference added to the original Burdet arms based on the fact that Robert's father, Hugh Burdet, was a third son, the difference for whom is a martlet.)

Knight of the Shire for Warwickshire

Member of Parliament
- In office 1320, 1325, 1327
- Monarch: Edward II

Sheriff of Warwickshire
- In office 1329
- Monarch: Edward III

Personal details
- Died: 1333 This date may not be correct, see children below
- Spouse: Elizabeth de Camville
- Children: Sir Gerard Burdet; Sir Robert Burdet; Isabel Burdet
- Parent: Hugh Burdet

Sir Robert Burdet (died 1333) was a Member of Parliament for Warwickshire and was Sheriff of Warwickshire.

== Origins ==
He was the son of Hugh Burdet and was a nephew of Sir William Burdet of Loseby who represented Leicestershire in Parliament in 1297.

== Career ==
He was summoned to Parliament for Warwickshire and Leicestershire in 1320, 1325 and 1327 and served as Sheriff from 1328 to 1329.

== Marriage and children ==
He married Elizabeth de Camville, daughter and sole heiress of Sir Gerard de Camville, and by the marriage he inherited the manors of Arrow (Note: which had passed to the Camvilles upon their marriage to Albreda, daughter of Geoffrey, Baron Marmion of Llanstephan) and Seckington in Warwickshire. By his wife he had children including:

- Sir Gerard Burdet (d. abt 1349), of Arrow, Warwickshire, eldest son and heir apparent, predeceased his father. IF he died in 1349 he can not have predeceased his father (died 1333).
- Sir Robert Burdet (born Seckington, 1345) of Bourton-on-Dunsmore, Warwickshire, eldest surviving son and heir. Ancestor of the Burdett baronets of Bramcote, Warwickshire (cr.1619). If his father died in 1333, how was Sir Robert born in 1345? (long gestation period?)
- Isabel Burdet who married Sir John Berkeley of Wymondham, Leicestershire

== Bibliography ==
- Betham, William (1884). The Baronetage of England. Vol. 1. London: Warde & Betham.
- Harleian (1929). The Knights of Edward I. Vol. I. London: Harleian Society.
- Nichols, John (1795). The History and Antiquities of the County of Leicester. Leicester: John Nichols.
- Parliamentary Writs. Vol. I. London: Public Record Office. 1827.
- Taylor, Ralph Penniston (1996). A History of Wymondham. Wymondham: Witmeha Press.
