= Clement Throckmorton (died 1573) =

English politician

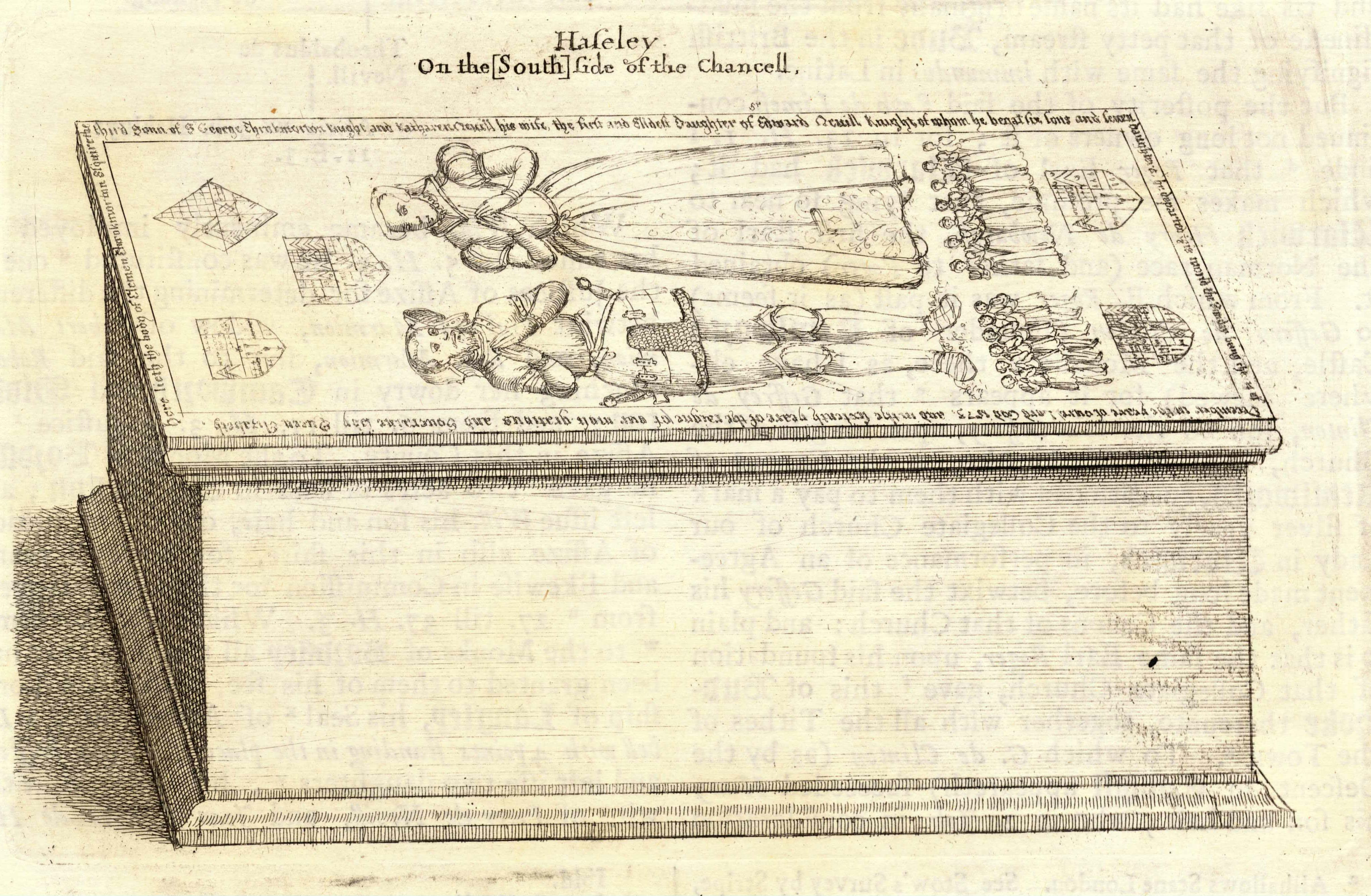
Monument to Clement Throckmorton (d. 1573) and wife Katherine Neville. Chest tomb with monumental brasses on top. Haseley Church, Warwickshire. Drawn by Wenceslaus Hollar (d. 1677)

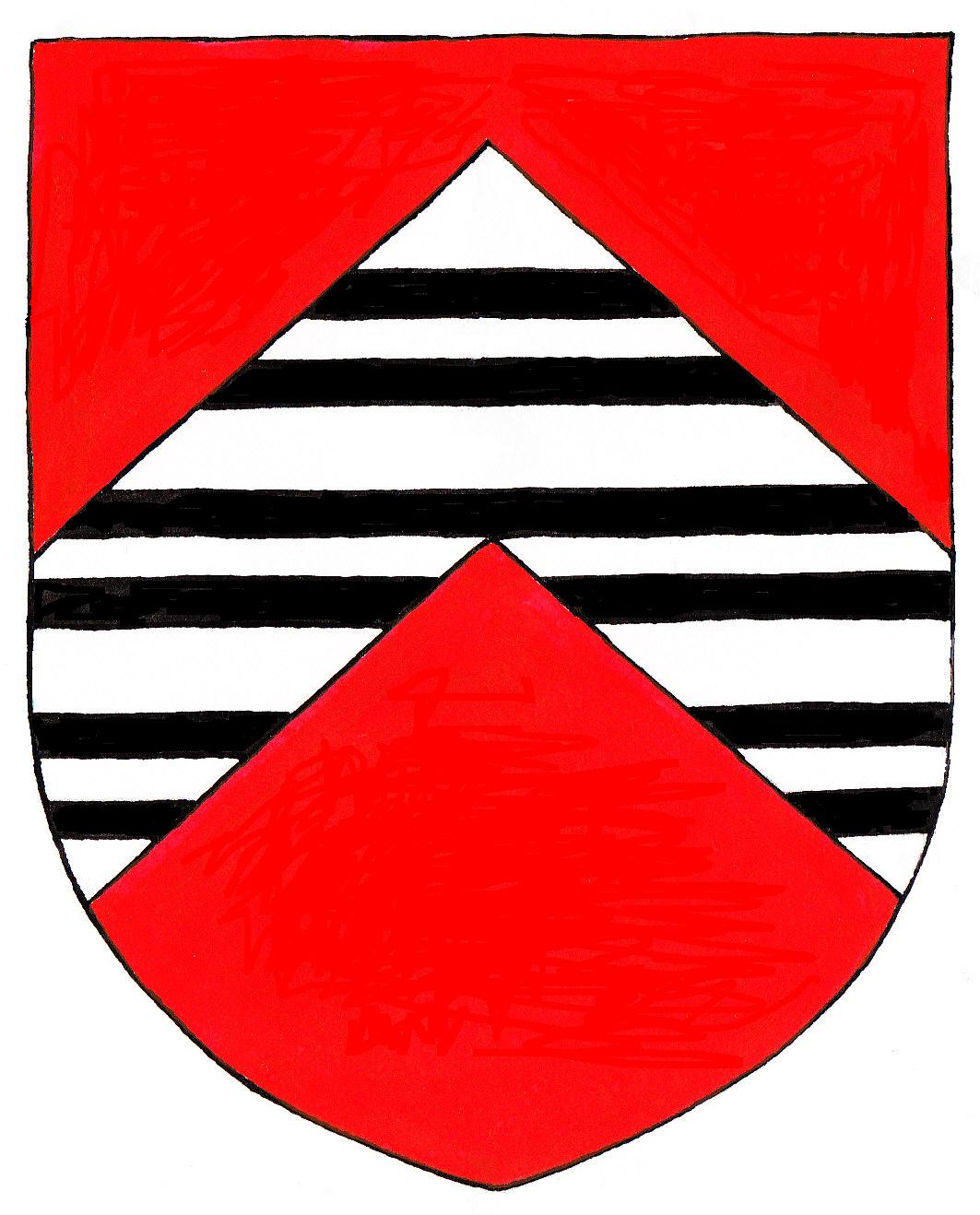
Arms of Throckmorton: Gules, on a chevron argent three bars gemelles sable. Crest: A falcon rising proper belled and jessed or. Mottos: (1): Virtus Sola Nobilitas (Virtue is the only nobility); (2): Moribus Antiquis (With ancient manners)

Clement Throckmorton (c. 1512 – 1573) was an English landowner and member of parliament in the middle years of the 16th century.

A member of a distinguished Warwickshire family, son of Sir George Throckmorton and his wife Katherine Vaux (daughter of Nicholas Vaux and Elizabeth FitzHugh) and the brother of the influential diplomat Sir Nicholas Throckmorton and Robert Throckmorton and cousin of Henry VIII's last Queen, Katherine Parr, Throckmorton sat in nine Parliaments between 1542 and 1572, representing Warwick four times and Warwickshire twice as well as three other scattered boroughs (Devizes, Sudbury and West Looe). He also had a successful military record, and was appointed Constable of Kenilworth Castle in 1553, a post he held until his death. He acquired the estate of Haseley in Warwickshire in 1554 from his uncle, who had himself acquired it from the Crown after the attainder of its previous owner, the Duke of Northumberland. He also enhanced his fortune through successful trading, and was a founder member of the Muscovy Company.

Clement in his youth served as cupbearer to his first cousin Queen Katherine Parr. He was in her household from at least 1544 until her death in 1548.

Throckmorton was a reliable but moderate Protestant, although one of his brothers remained a Catholic, which cast a shadow of doubt over Clement's allegiances, and he himself was loyal to Queen Mary while she was on the throne. However, his son, Job, was later one of the most active lay supporters of the Puritan opposition, and was deeply involved in the publication of the Marprelate Tracts. He married Katherine Neville, daughter of Sir Edward Neville of Addington and Eleanor Windsor, daughter of Sir Andrew Windsor, 1st Baron Windsor.
