= Warwickshire (constituency) =

Parliamentary constituency in the United Kingdom, 1801–1832

- Former county constituency for the House of Commons
- County: Warwickshire

1293–1832
- Replaced by: North Warwickshire and South Warwickshire

Warwickshire was a parliamentary constituency in Warwickshire in England until 1832. It returned two Members of Parliament (MPs), traditionally known as knights of the shire, to the House of Commons of England, Great Britain and House of Commons of the Parliament of the United Kingdom, elected by the bloc vote system.

== History ==
=== Boundaries and franchise ===
The constituency, which seems first to have returned members to Parliament in 1293, consisted of the historic county of Warwickshire, excluding the city of Coventry which had the status of a county in its itself after 1451. (Although Warwickshire also contained the borough of Warwick and part of the borough of Tamworth, each of which elected two MPs in its own right for part of the period when Warwickshire was a constituency, these were not excluded from the county constituency, and owning property within the borough could confer a vote at the county election. This was not the case, though, for Coventry.)

As in other county constituencies the franchise between 1430 and 1832 was defined by the Forty Shilling Freeholder Act, which gave the right to vote to every man who possessed freehold property within the county valued at £2 or more per year for the purposes of land tax; it was not necessary for the freeholder to occupy his land, nor even in later years to be resident in the county at all.

Except during the period of the Commonwealth, Warwickshire had two MPs elected by the bloc vote method, under which each voter had two votes. (In the First and Second Parliaments of Oliver Cromwell's Protectorate, there was a general redistribution of seats and Warwickshire elected four members; the traditional arrangements were restored from 1659.)

=== Character ===
In the Middle Ages Warwickshire was mainly an agricultural county, but the realisation of the value of its mineral wealth, and eventually the coming of the Industrial Revolution, transformed its character. By the time of the Great Reform Act in 1832, Warwickshire had a population of approximately 337,000, of which 142,000 were in Birmingham and its suburbs; since Birmingham had been of little importance in medieval times it was not a borough, and was represented in Parliament only through Warwickshire's county members. The franchise being based on land ownership, the urban areas commanded a much smaller proportion of the votes than of the population: at the election in 1820 when Warwickshire recorded its highest turnout, only 399 of the 3,122 votes were cast in Birmingham, and a little under 300 in total from the other main towns (Warwick, Stratford-upon-Avon and Nuneaton).

Nevertheless, this gave the industrial and manufacturing interests some leverage, which they found necessary since the interests of the rest of the county were sometimes much at odds with their own. As a group of Birmingham manufacturers explained in 1780 letter to the Earl of Dartmouth (one of the most influential of the locally connected noblemen):

The various commercial regulations, so frequently made by the Legislature, affect the trade and manufacturers of this place very much and render it an object of great importance to its inhabitants that gentlemen may, if possible, be chosen for the county who are connected with the people, and not entirely uninformed of the particulars in which their interests consist.

- Letter published in the 13th Report of the Historical Manuscripts Commission, quoted by Porritt

In practice contested elections were rare: the general elections of 1705 and 1774 were the only ones of the 29 between 1701 and 1832 and which Warwickshire's two MPs were not elected unopposed. Elections were held at a single polling place, Warwick, and voters from the rest of the county had to travel to the county town to exercise their franchise; candidates were expected to meet the expenses of their supporters in travelling to the poll, making the cost of a contested election substantial. Potential candidates therefore preferred to canvass support beforehand and usually not insisting on a vote being taken unless they were confident of winning; at most elections, amicable negotiation had settled the outcome well in advance.

The representation was generally in the hands of the leading gentry of the county – notably the Mordaunts of Walton, who held one of the two seats for 82 of the 122 years between 1698 and 1820. But increasingly during the 18th century, it became necessary to defer to the preferences of the Birmingham freeholders in choosing between the available candidates. The 1774 election developed into a hard-fought contest when agreement could not be reached over who should replace Sir Charles Mordaunt, who had retired after forty years as the county's MP. After a poll that lasted 11 days, it was the nominee of the Birmingham interests, Sir Charles Holte of Aston, who emerged triumphant over Mordaunt's son. When Holte in his turn retired after one Parliament, the candidate chosen to replace him by the meeting of Birmingham freeholders was accepted by the county meeting without opposition, the other hopefuls being left to squabble over the one remaining seat.

Nevertheless, the choice remained one between the various gentry of the county, and by the early 19th century Birmingham had become one of the most vocal centres of agitation for parliamentary reform. This resulted in violent disruption of the 1830 Warwickshire election, even though the two candidates were unopposed. A mob from the Birmingham Union, 300 or 400 strong and accompanied by a band, invaded the hustings at Warwick and demanded assurances from the candidates that they would support reform. Peel regarded this "daring attempt to overawe the nomination of representatives at Warwick" as one of the most serious in a generally tumultuous election; yet it seems to have failed to intimidate the candidates, since one was already a reformer and the other refused to give any pledge of support.

=== Abolition ===
The constituency was abolished in 1832 by the Great Reform Act, which divided the county into two new divisions, North Warwickshire and South Warwickshire, as well as establishing Birmingham as a borough electing MPs in its own right.

== Members of Parliament ==
=== 1290–1640 ===
Parliament	First member	Second member
1320	Sir Robert Burdet	
1325	Sir Robert Burdet	
1327	Sir Robert Burdet	
1377	Henry de Ardern	
1380	Henry de Ardern	
1386	George Castell	Sir John Peyto
1388 (Feb)	Sir William Bagot	Guy Spyne
1388 (Sep)	Sir William Bagot	Guy Spyne
1390 (Jan)	Sir William Bagot	Guy Spyne
1390 (Nov)	Sir William Bagot	Guy Spyne
1391	Sir William Bagot	Guy Spyne
1393	Sir William Bagot	John Catesby
1394	Sir William Bagot	Sir Thomas Burdet
1395	Sir William Bagot	William Spernore
1397 (Jan)	Sir William Bagot	Sir Thomas Clinton
1397 (Sep)	Sir William Bagot	Thomas Crewe
1399	Sir William Lucy	Sir Alfred Trussell
1401	Sir Thomas Burdet	Sir Alfred Trussell
1402	Sir William Bagot	Sir Alfred Trussell
1404 (Jan)	Robert Hugford	Roger Smart
1404 (Oct)	Thomas Crewe	Thomas Raleigh
1406	Sir Thomas Burdet	Sir Thomas Lucy
1407	Sir Alfred Trussell	Henry Sutton
1410	Sir William Mountfort	
1411	Sir Thomas Lucy	Thomas Erdington
1413 (Feb)		
1413 (May)	William Birmingham	John Mallory
1414 (Apr)	Robert Castell	Thomas Stafford
1414 (Nov)	John Harewell	John Knightley
1415		
1416 (Mar)		
1416 (Oct)		
1417		
1419	Sir Thomas Burdet	John Mallory
1420	Sir John Cokayne	William Peyto
1421 (May)	William Holt	John Mallory
1421 (Dec)	Sir John Cokayne	John Chetwynd
1422	Sir William Mountfort	Robert Castell
1423	Sir William Mountfort	
1427	Sir William Mountfort	
1429	Sir William Mountfort	
1437	Sir William Mountfort	
1445	Sir William Mountfort	Sir Thomas Malory
1450	Sir William Mountfort	
1463	Sir Simon Mountford	
1485	Sir Simon Mountford	William Hugford
1491	Sir Simon Mountford	
1510–1523	No names known	
1529	Sir George Throckmorton	Sir Edward Ferrers
1536		
1539	Richard Catesby	John Greville
1542		
1545	Sir Fulke Greville	Sir Marmaduke Constable
1547	Sir Fulke Greville	Robert Burdett, died and replaced Jan 1552 by Sir Marmaduke Constable
1553 (Mar)	Sir Richard Catesby	Robert Throckmorton
1553 (Oct)	Robert Throckmorton	Thomas Marrow
1554 (Apr)	(Sir) William Wigston	Sir Fulke Greville
1554 (Nov)	Sir Fulke Greville	Sir William Wigston
1555	Sir Robert Throckmorton	Sir William Wigston
1558	Sir Ambrose Cave	Thomas Throckmorton
1558–1559	Sir Ambrose Cave	Thomas Lucy
1562–1563	Sir Ambrose Cave	Clement Throckmorton
1571	Sir Thomas Lucy	John Huband
1572 (Apr)	Sir William Devereux, died and replaced Nov 1584 by George Digby	Clement Throckmorton, died and replaced Mar 1575 by John Huband
1584 (Nov)	Sir Thomas Lucy	George Digby
1586 (Oct)	Sir John Harington	Fulke Greville
1588 (Oct)	Fulke Greville	Richard Verney
1593	Fulke Greville	Edward Greville
1597 (Oct)	Fulke Greville	William Combe
1601	Fulke Greville	Sir Robert Digby
1604	Sir Edward Greville	Sir Richard Verney
1614	Sir Thomas Lucy	Sir Richard Verney
1621	Sir Thomas Lucy	Sir Fulke Greville ennobled 1621 and replaced by Sir Francis Leigh
1624	Sir Thomas Lucy	Sir Clement Throckmorton
1625	Sir Thomas Lucy	Sir Clement Throckmorton
1626	Sir Thomas Lucy	Sir Clement Throckmorton
1628	Sir Thomas Lucy	Sir Thomas Leigh, 2nd Baronet
1629–1640	No Parliaments summoned	

=== 1640–1832 ===
Year	First member	First party	Second member	Second party
November 1640	Lord Compton	Royalist	Edward Combe	
December 1640	Lord Compton	Royalist	Sir Richard Shuckburgh	Royalist
March 1643	Compton inherited the Earldom of Northampton – seat vacant		Sir Richard Shuckburgh	Royalist
January 1644	Compton inherited the Earldom of Northampton – seat vacant		Shuckburgh disabled from sitting – seat vacant	
1645	Thomas Boughton		Sir John Burgoyne	
December 1648	Boughton and Burgoyne excluded in Pride's Purge – both seats vacant			
1653	John St Nicholas		Richard Lucy	
Representation increased to four members in First Protectorate Parliament
1654	Richard Lucy, Thomas Willoughby, Sir Richard Temple, William Purefoy			
1656	Richard Lucy, (Sir) Roger Burgoyne, Edward Peyto, Joseph Hawkesworth			
Representation reverted to two members in Third Protectorate Parliament
January 1659	Richard Lucy		Joseph Hawkesworth	
May 1659	Warwickshire was not represented in the restored Rump			
April 1660	Thomas Archer		George Browne	
1661	Sir Robert Holte, Bt		Sir Henry Puckering, Bt	
1679	Sir Edward Boughton, Bt		Robert Burdett	Tory
1681	Sir Richard Newdigate, Bt		Thomas Mariet	
1685	Sir Charles Holte, Bt		Sir Richard Verney	
1689	Sir Richard Newdigate, Bt		Sir Richard Verney	
1690	William Bromley		Andrew Archer	
1698	Sir John Mordaunt, Bt		Sir Charles Shuckburgh, Bt	
1705	Sir John Mordaunt, Bt		Andrew Archer	
1710	Sir John Mordaunt, Bt		Lord Compton	
1712	Sir John Mordaunt, Bt		Sir William Boughton, Bt	
1713	Sir John Mordaunt, Bt		Andrew Archer	
1715	William Peyto		Andrew Archer	
1722	William Peyto		Robert Digby	Tory
1726	William Peyto		Edward Digby	Tory
1734	Sir Charles Mordaunt, Bt		Edward Digby	Tory
1746	Sir Charles Mordaunt, Bt		Hon. William Craven	
1765	Sir Charles Mordaunt, Bt		William Throckmorton Bromley	
1769	Sir Charles Mordaunt, Bt		Thomas Skipwith, Bt	
1774	Sir Charles Holte, Bt		Thomas Skipwith, Bt	
1780	Sir Robert Lawley, Bt		Sir George Shuckburgh, Bt	
1793	Sir John Mordaunt, Bt		Sir George Shuckburgh, Bt	
1802	Dugdale Stratford Dugdale		Sir George Shuckburgh, Bt	
1804	Dugdale Stratford Dugdale		Charles Mordaunt	
1820	Dugdale Stratford Dugdale		Francis Lawley	Whig
1831	Sir Grey Skipwith, Bt	Whig	Francis Lawley	Whig
1832	Constituency abolished			
