= Burton Lazars =

Village in Leicestershire, England

Coordinates: 52.7450°N 0.8630°W

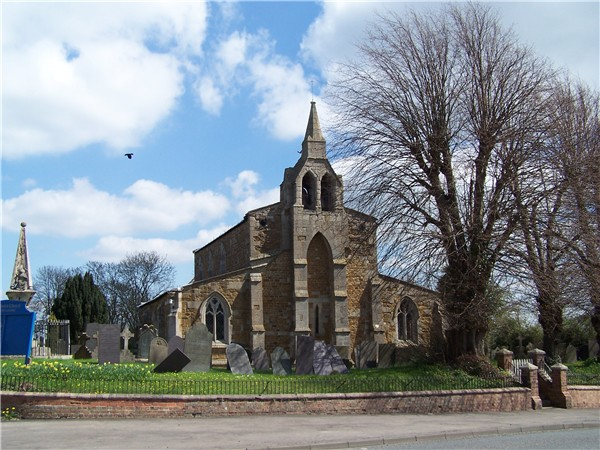
- St James Church, Burton Lazars

- Location within Leicestershire
- Population: 450 (2015 Estimate)
- OS grid reference: SK767168
  - London: 146 kilometres (91 mi) SSE
- Civil parish: Burton and Dalby
- District: Melton
- Shire county: Leicestershire
- Region: East Midlands
- Country: England
- Sovereign state: United Kingdom
- Post town: MELTON MOWBRAY
- Postcode district: LE13-14
- Dialling code: 01664
- Police: Leicestershire
- Fire: Leicestershire
- Ambulance: East Midlands
- UK Parliament: Melton and Syston
- Website: www.burtonlazars.com

Burton Lazars is a village and former civil parish, now in the parish of Burton and Dalby, in the Melton district, in the county of Leicestershire, England. It is two miles (3 km) south-east of Melton Mowbray, having a population of c.450 in 2015. It is the site of the remains of the English headquarters of the military and hospitaller Order of Saint Lazarus.

== Village history ==
The village's name means 'farm/settlement with a fortification'. The name 'Lazars' derives from St Lazarus, and was added after the Leprosy Hospital was opened by the Order of Saint Lazarus in the 12th century.

It was originally an Anglo-Saxon village which was listed under the simple name of 'Burtone' at the time of William the Conqueror's Domesday Book in 1086. Before the conquest it was held by Leofric (the noble) son of Leofwin, but was given to Geoffrey of la Guerche once the Normans had taken control of England. It consisted of 104 acres (42 ha) of meadow and two mills and had a population made up of 30 villagers, 27 smallholders, 4 slaves, 100 freemen, 2 priests and had a value of £23.5.

Burton's name was changed to Burton St Lazarus when the Order of Saint Lazarus opened a Leper Hospital on a hill next to the village during the Crusades of the 12th century. The hospital became the Order's headquarters for the whole of its English estates and raised large amounts of money to fund the Order's activities (both military and hospitalary) in the Holy Land. The village's name quickly became abbreviated to Burton Lazars.

The village has a natural sulphurous spring which was probably a major reason for the location of the hospital. A more recent attempt to use this for bathing was made in 1760 when a bath house was built but this did not achieve commercial success.

The graves of the racing driver Eliot Zborowski and his son Louis Zborowski, also a racing driver, lie in the parish churchyard.

In the early 1900s the village was famous for a steeplechase racecourse and grandstand just east of the village.

In 1866 Burton Lazars became a parish in its own right, on 1 April 1936 the parish was abolished to form "Burton and Dalby". In 1931 the parish had a population of 197.

== Hospital of Burton St Lazarus ==
=== Early history ===
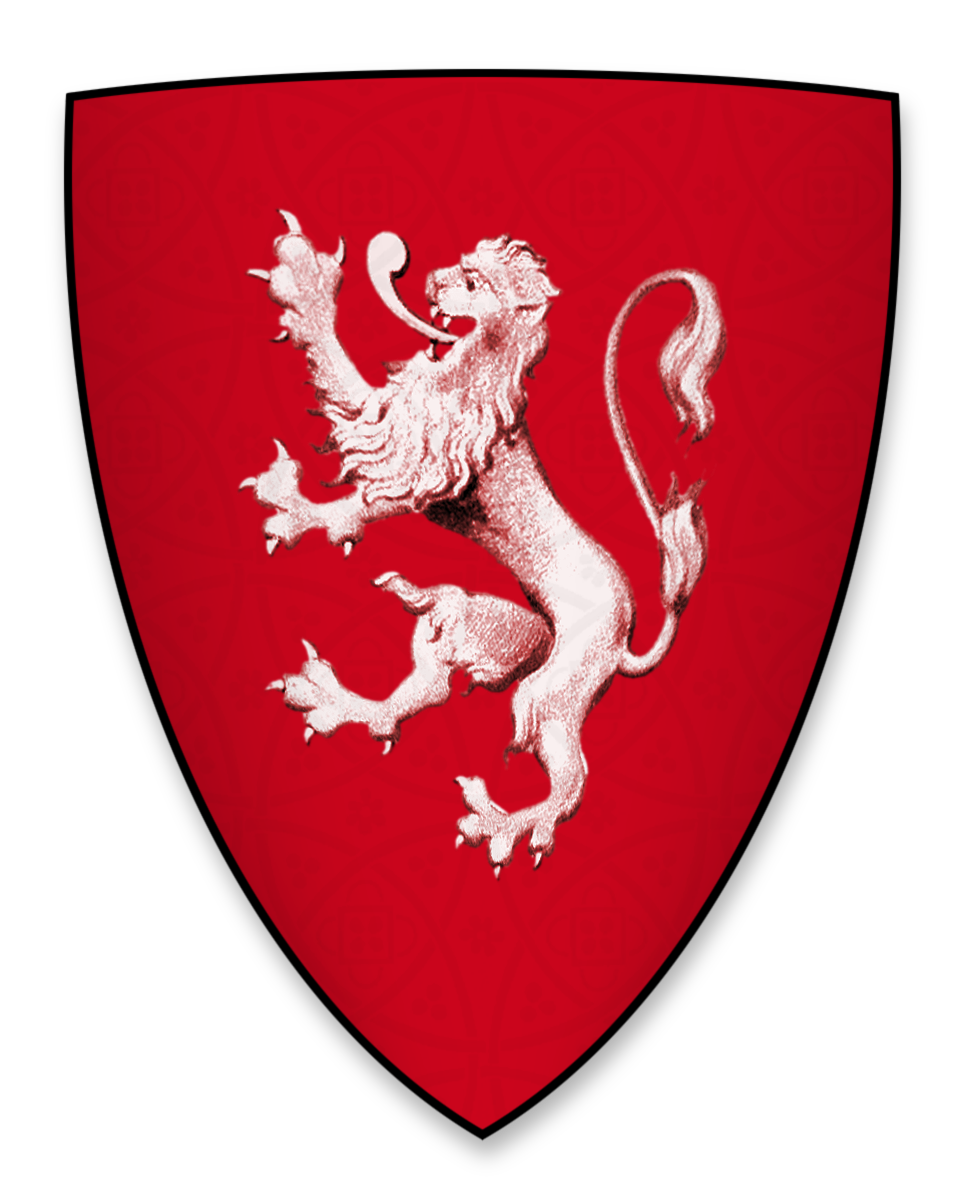
Arms of Roger de Mowbray subsequently adopted by Burton Lazars Hospital - gules, a lion rampant argent

The hospital at Burton Lazars was founded between 1135 and 1138 and is thought to have been financed by subscriptions from throughout England. It was flourishing by 1146 when it started to found cells in other parts of the country to cope with the spread of leprosy brought back by soldiers and pilgrims returning from the crusades.

The largest donor is supposed to have been the Norman landowner Roger de Mowbray who himself took part in the Second Crusade from 1147 to 1148; his lion rampant coat of arms was adopted by the hospital alongside the Order of St Lazarus' normal green cross. He made a generous donation of two carucates of land (c.240 acres (100 ha)), a house and two mills to the Order in 1150 and his family continued their support for many generations.

Burton St Lazarus was dedicated to the Blessed Virgin and St Lazarus and consisted of a Master and eight brethren, who all followed the Augustinian rule, and varying numbers of lepers and injured knights. The brethren (and sisters) wore habits and were not afraid to beg for alms. They had the use of a chapter house, a burial ground and were assisted by lay priests and servants.

Other early donors include Simon, Earl of Huntingdon and his wife Alice daughter of Gilbert de Gant, Earl of Lincoln who gave the churches of Great Hale, Heckington, and Threckingham; William Burdett of Loseby who gave the churches of Haselbech in Northamptonshire and Loseby and Galby in Leicestershire; William de Ferrers, 3rd Earl of Derby who gave Spondon in Derbyshire; and Henry de Lacy who gave the church of Castleford in Yorkshire.

In 1180 King Henry II confirmed the above grants by charter and gave the hospital 40 marks per annum of his own. Subsequent Kings and Popes granted further privileges such as exemption from royal and papal taxes and the right to sell indulgences for the profit of the Order.

The Hospital survived a great fire in the 1300s caused by a plumber.

=== General Commander of the Order of St Lazarus in England ===
The Master of the hospital was not only in charge of the hospital at Burton but also of the Order's lands and hospitals throughout the entirety of England and was known as "General Commander of the Order of St Lazarus in England". He was answerable to no-one but the Master of the Order at Jerusalem. The Master of Burton Lazars travelled throughout the country visiting other Lazarite houses performing administrative duties and correcting faults.

Although the Order's main purpose was to provide protection and hospice for both healthy and leprous pilgrims and knights in the Holy Land, its function in England was primarily a fund-raising one. The Master was responsible for managing its English estates and was involved in frequent territorial disputes. Methods of debt recovery employed by the Leicestershire gentry included kidnapping and theft and the Masters of Burton Lazars were not afraid to use such vigilante practices.

The Order also saw internal conflict with two notable disputes between its brethren. The first concerned Nicholas de Dover who claimed to be Master of the Order in 1364, despite Geoffrey de Chaddesden already being recognised as master and not having resigned. Dover took his case to the Pope and on his return procured a mandate ordering the arrest of Chaddesden, calling him a "vagabond" and dismissing him by referring to him as just a lowly "brother of the Order". Four years later Chaddesden complained that he had been imprisoned by "evil-doers" at Burton St Lazars and that his life was in danger. Luckily for him he had some powerful friends and in 1372 a compromise agreement was reached whereby Geoffrey de Chaddesden gave up command of the order in return for a pension of forty marks a year for the rest of his life.

The second dispute was triggered in 1389 when Richard II appointed two of his own clerks to run Burton Lazars and St Giles Hospital, London, another of the possessions of the Order of St Lazarus. The Order itself had appointed Walter Lynton as its Master and conflict broke out in 1391 when the Abbot of St Mary Graces, Tower Hill seized St Giles Hospital for himself and removed stock and furniture worth £1000. Lynton responded by leading a group of armed men to St Giles and recapturing it using force. The dispute was finally settled in court with the King claiming he had been misled about the ownership of St Giles and recognising Lynton as legal Master of both hospitals.

To avoid further ownership disputes Lynton created the Cartulary of Burton St Lazars to fully document the Order's rights to its lands.

=== Confraternity of Burton Lazars ===
The Fall of Acre in 1291 marked the end of the crusades and pilgrimages to the Holy Land and the role of the Order of St Lazarus changed to one of confraternity as Leprosy slowly died out in England. Wealthy donations to the order were rewarded with membership and prayers for the souls of the donors and their families to help in their purification. Elderly relatives of members were also offered accommodation at Burton in their retirement.

Membership was not just restricted to the local gentry; it also boasted wealthy patrons such as Lady Margaret Beaufort, Sir Henry Stafford and Henry VII and also entire villages such as East and West Hagbourne, Berkshire and Tredington, Gloucestershire. It seems to have been a large business and agents were used to recruit new members in areas far away from the immediate vicinity of Burton.

In 1422 the confraternity of Burton Lazars was granted the older Leper Hospital of the Hospital of the Holy Innocents, Lincoln

A large number of seals have been found in various parts of England that belonged to the Confraternity of Burton St Lazarus.

=== Demise ===
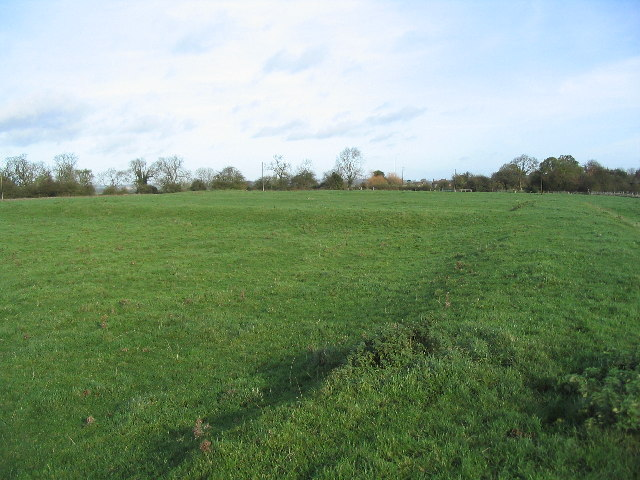
St Lazarus Hospital (site of), Burton Lazars

The hospital survived the initial Dissolution of the Monasteries but was surrendered to the crown on 4 May 1544 when it was valued at £265 10s 2.5d. This figure places Burton St Lazars as being wealthier than other hospitals but not as prosperous as monasteries.

=== Remains ===
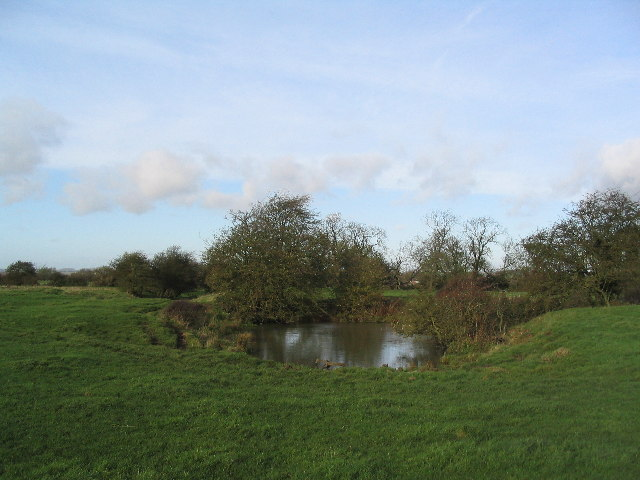
Pond at site of St Lazarus Hospital

The hospital has become buried but its presence can still be seen today in the shape of earthworks and ponds. In 1913 the Marquis of Granby, later the 9th Duke of Rutland, began excavations and uncovered baking ovens and 100 clay tiles (now kept by the British Museum), some bearing the Coats of Arms of families such as the Ferrers, Astleys and Bassets who were patrons or members of the Hospital. The excavation was interrupted by the onset of war and so was not completed.

Aerial photography and fieldwork have subsequently helped make more sense of the layout of the site but, as of yet, no further excavations have been made which would reveal more of its history.
