= John Knightley (MP) =

15th-century English politician

John Knightley (died 1415/16), of Chesterton, Warwickshire was an English Member of Parliament for Warwickshire in November 1414.
