= Order of Saint Lazarus =

Roman Catholic military order founded by crusaders around 1119

The Military and Hospitaller Order of Saint Lazarus of Jerusalem
- Ordinis Fratrum & Militum Hospitalis Leprosorum Sancti Lazari Hierosolymitani
- Flag of the order
- Successor: Order of Saints Maurice and Lazarus (Italian branch, since 1572); Order of Our Lady of Mount Carmel and Saint Lazarus of Jerusalem united (French branch, 1608–1830)
- Established: Circa 1130
- Dissolved: 1572: merger of Italian branch 1608: merger of French branch
- Type: Military order
- Members: Catholic
- Official language: Latin
- Patron saint: Saint Lazarus
- Parent organization: Catholic Church
- Affiliations: House of Savoy (since 1572); House of Bourbon (1608–1830)

The Order of Saint Lazarus of Jerusalem, also known as the Leper Brothers of Jerusalem or simply as Lazarists, was a Catholic military order founded by Crusaders in the Latin Kingdom of Jerusalem and led by a Grand Master. While the monastic order is believed to have been formally established in the 1130s as a hospitaller body, documentary evidence confirms that its central edifice, a leper hospital dedicated to Saint Lazarus, was a functioning concern as early as 1073.

Unlike other major military orders, the Order of Saint Lazarus was centered on the charism of caring for those afflicted with leprosy, and its early membership was largely composed of leprous knights who had been forced to leave the Knights Templar or Knights Hospitaller. Despite its primarily medical and charitable focus, the Order assumed a military role in the 13th century to defend the Holy Land, and received canonical recognition as an order of chivalry from Pope Alexander IV in 1255.

Stemma dell'Ordine di San Lazzaro

Following the Fall of Acre in 1291, the Order relocated its headquarters to the Château de Boigny in France. Over the subsequent centuries, the Order underwent a complex institutional evolution:

- In the Italian states, it was merged in 1572 with the Order of Saint Maurice to form the Order of Saints Maurice and Lazarus under the House of Savoy, which remains a recognized dynastic order today.
- In France, it was administratively linked in 1608 to the Order of Our Lady of Mount Carmel, becoming a prestigious royal institution until it was left to become extinct following the Bourbon Restoration in 1830.

== Origins and the Crusader Era ==
The military and hospitaller Order of Saint Lazarus of Jerusalem originated in a leper hospital founded in the 12th century by Crusaders of the Latin Kingdom of Jerusalem. While the Knights of St. Lazarus later claimed to be a continuation of ancient Eastern leper hospitals to establish a sense of "remote antiquity" and pass as the oldest of all orders, historian Charles Moeller described this pretension as "apocryphal"; however, documentary evidence confirms that the edifice was a functioning concern as early as 1073.

The monastic order itself is believed to have been created in the 1130s as a hospitaller order, adopting the hospital Rule of Saint Augustine in use in the West. It was recognised by King Fulk in 1142. While the Order remained primarily a hospitaller order centered on its charism of caring for those afflicted with leprosy, the knights eventually assumed a military role. Although it has been claimed that the Order assumed a military role in the 12th century, this date may not be supported by verifiable evidence, with the earliest reference to the order's military activity dated to 1234. The Lazarists were distinguished by a green cross upon their mantle.

=== Expansion and Military Action ===
Hospitals dependent on the Jerusalem leprosarium were established in Acre and various countries in Europe, particularly in Southern Italy (Capua), Hungary, Switzerland, France (Boigny), and England (Burton Lazars). In 1154, Louis VII of France, on his return from the Second Crusade, gave the Order the Château of Boigny near Orléans, which became its headquarters outside of the Holy Land. This example was followed by Henry II of England, who established a house at Harehope, and by Emperor Frederick II.

The knights of the Order of Saint Lazarus notably participated in several major engagements:

- Siege of Acre (1191)
- Battle of Arsuf and the Battle of Jaffa (1192)
- Battle of La Forbie (1244), following the fall of Jerusalem in July of that year.
- Defense of Acre (1291).

The Order was canonically recognised as a hospitaller and military order of chivalry under the Rule of Saint Augustine in the Papal bull Cum a Nobis Petitur of Pope Alexander IV in 1255. In 1262, Pope Urban IV assured it the same immunities granted to other monastic orders. Following the Fall of Acre in 1291, the knights moved first to Cyprus, then Sicily, and finally back to Boigny, which had been raised to a barony in 1288. After the fall of the Kingdom of Jerusalem, the order split into two main branches situated in Italy and France.

The green-enameled Maltese Cross of the Order of Saint Lazarus.

== Late medieval period ==
The order quickly abandoned its military activities after the fall of Acre. In 1308, King Philip IV of France gave the order his temporal protection. However, the order faced significant institutional challenges in the 15th century. In 1489 and 1490, Pope Innocent VIII attempted to merge the order and its land holdings with the Knights Hospitaller. This was resisted by the larger part of the jurisdictions of the Order of Saint Lazarus, including those in France, Southern Italy, Hungary, Switzerland, and England. The Knights Hospitaller only managed to appropriate the order's holdings in what is now Germany.

Although the merger was confirmed in 1505 by Pope Julius II, the Order of Saint Lazarus continued to resist, and the Order of St. John never came into possession of the French property. This claim was legally rejected by the Parlement of Paris in 1547. In 1565, Pope Pius IV annulled the bulls of his predecessors and restored all possessions to the order, attempting to give the grand magistry to his favorite, Giovanni de Castiglione; however, Castiglione did not succeed in securing the commanderies in France.

== Continuations after 1572 ==
=== Royal House of Savoy ===
With the death of Castiglione in 1572, Pope Gregory XIII united the Italian branch with the Order of Saint Maurice to form the Order of Saints Maurice and Lazarus. This order was linked in perpetuity with the House of Savoy, and the title of Grand Master became hereditary in that house. However, the merger excluded the order's holdings in the southern part of Italy, then part of the Spanish realm, which were transformed into ecclesiastical benefices.

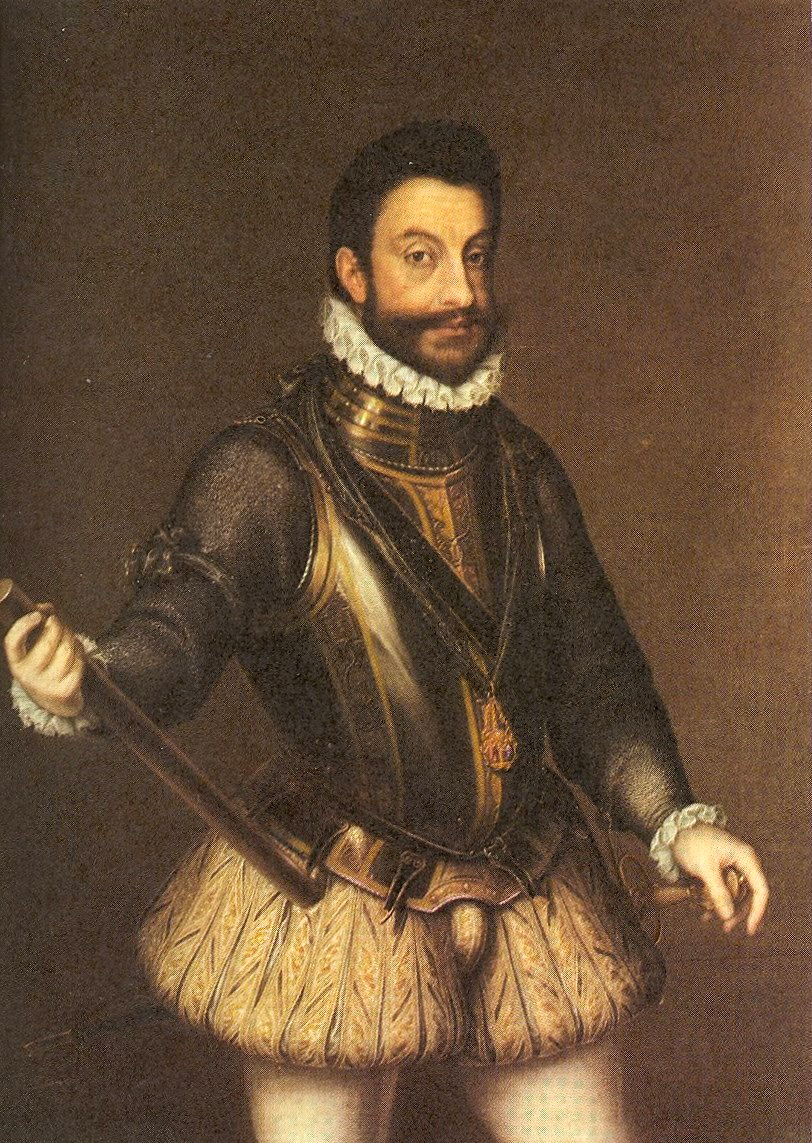
Emmanuel Philibert, Duke of Savoy (1528–1580), founder and first Grand Master of the amalgamated Order of Saints Maurice and Lazarus, recognised in 1572 by Pope Gregory XIII.

By the time of Pope Clement VIII, the order had two houses: one at Turin for land combat and one at Nice to provide galleys to fight the Turks at sea. It became a national order of chivalry upon the Unification of Italy in 1861 but has been suppressed by law since the foundation of the Republic in 1946. Since 1951, the order has not been recognized officially by the Italian state, though the House of Savoy in exile continues to bestow it for eminence in public service, science, art, and charitable works.

=== Royal House of France ===
In 1604, Henry IV of France re-declared the French branch a protectorate of the French Crown. In 1608, with the approval of the Holy See, he linked the branch administratively to the Order of Our Lady of Mount Carmel to form the Royal Military and Hospitaller Order of Our Lady of Mount Carmel and Saint Lazarus of Jerusalem united. Unlike the Savoyard merger, the French branch was not completely merged; the orders were managed as two separate entities, with individuals being admitted to one order but not necessarily both.

During the French Revolution, a decree of 30 July 1791 suppressed all royal and knightly orders in France, followed by the confiscation of property in 1792. The Holy See did not suppress the order, and the Grand Master, Louis, Count of Provence (the future Louis XVIII), continued to function in exile. During this period, several Russian and Baltic nobles were admitted to the order, including General John Lamb, Prince Suvorov, Count Pahlen, and Count Jacob Sievers.

The order was listed in the Almanach Royal from 1814 to 1830. Following the deaths of Louis XVIII and the order's lieutenant-general, the duc de Châtre, in 1824, appointments to the order ceased to be made from 1830 and was removed from the royal registers.

== Relationship with the Holy See ==
The Holy See maintains a strict and definitive position regarding chivalric orders. According to official statements from the Vatican Secretariat of State, most recently reaffirmed in a formal note in 2012, the Catholic Church recognizes only its own sovereign orders (such as the Order of Christ or the Order of St. Gregory the Great) and two specific protected entities: the Sovereign Military Order of Malta and the Equestrian Order of the Holy Sepulchre of Jerusalem.

Guy Sainty claims that the Order of Saints Maurice and Lazarus is the legitimate dynastic successor to the medieval order, based on the 1572 Papal Bull issued by Pope Gregory XIII that united the Italian branch of the Order of Saint Lazarus with the Order of Saint Maurice in perpetuity under the Grand Magistry of the Savoy dynasty.

== Legacy ==
The word lazarette (in some languages being synonymous with leprosarum) is derived from the hospitaller Order of Saint Lazarus. Their foundations were adapted as quarantine stations in the 15th century, when leprosy was no longer the scourge it had been in earlier centuries.

The order's legacy has been claimed by a modern Order of Saint Lazarus, statuted in 1910, which claims to maintain the spirit and history of the medieval Order of Saint Lazarus. While its origins and claims to regularity have attracted some controvery in chivalric and academic circles, its membership has included several prominent figures in nobility and politics.

== Gallery ==
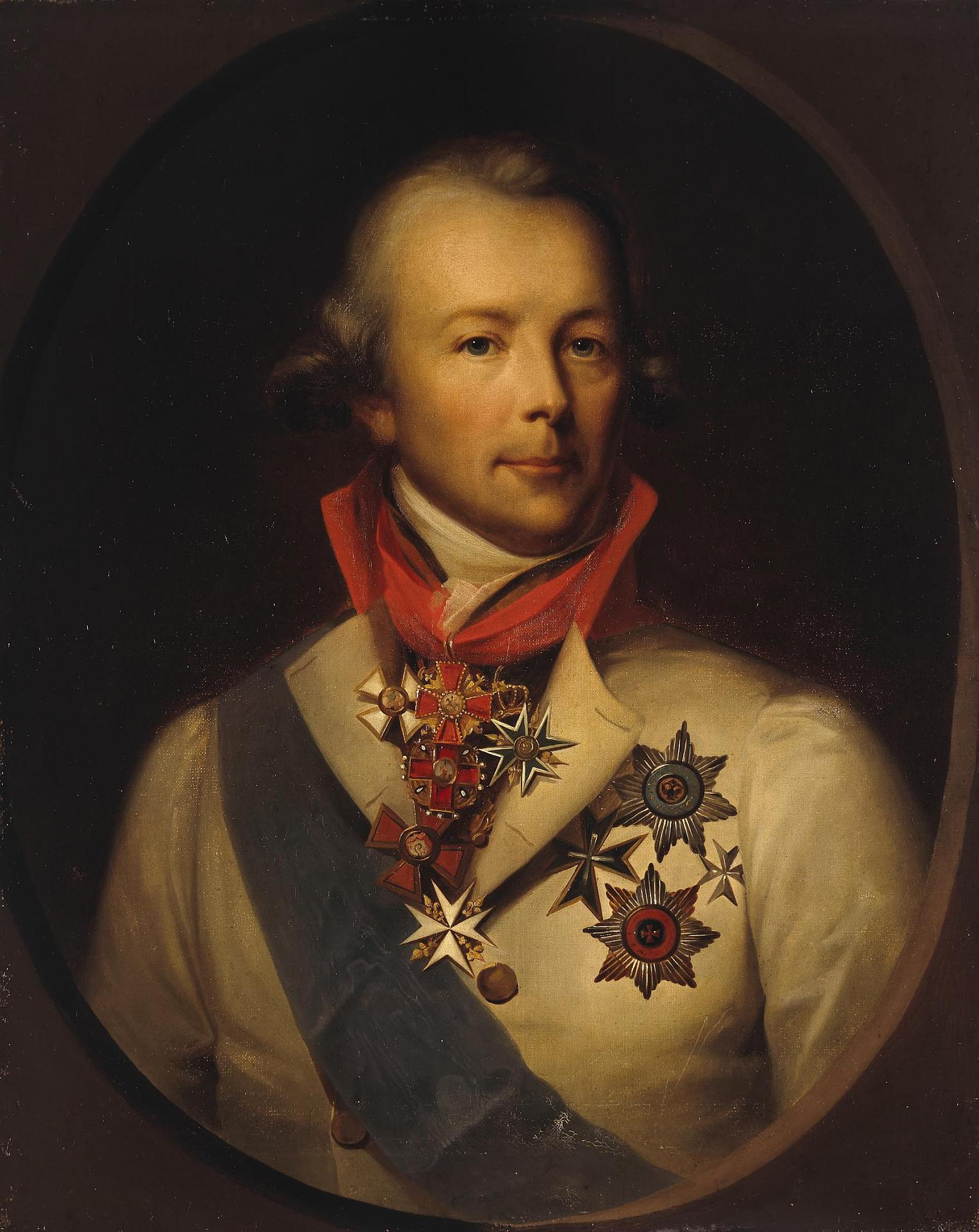
Peter Ludwig von der Pahlen (1745–1826) with the Order of Saint Lazarus knight cross

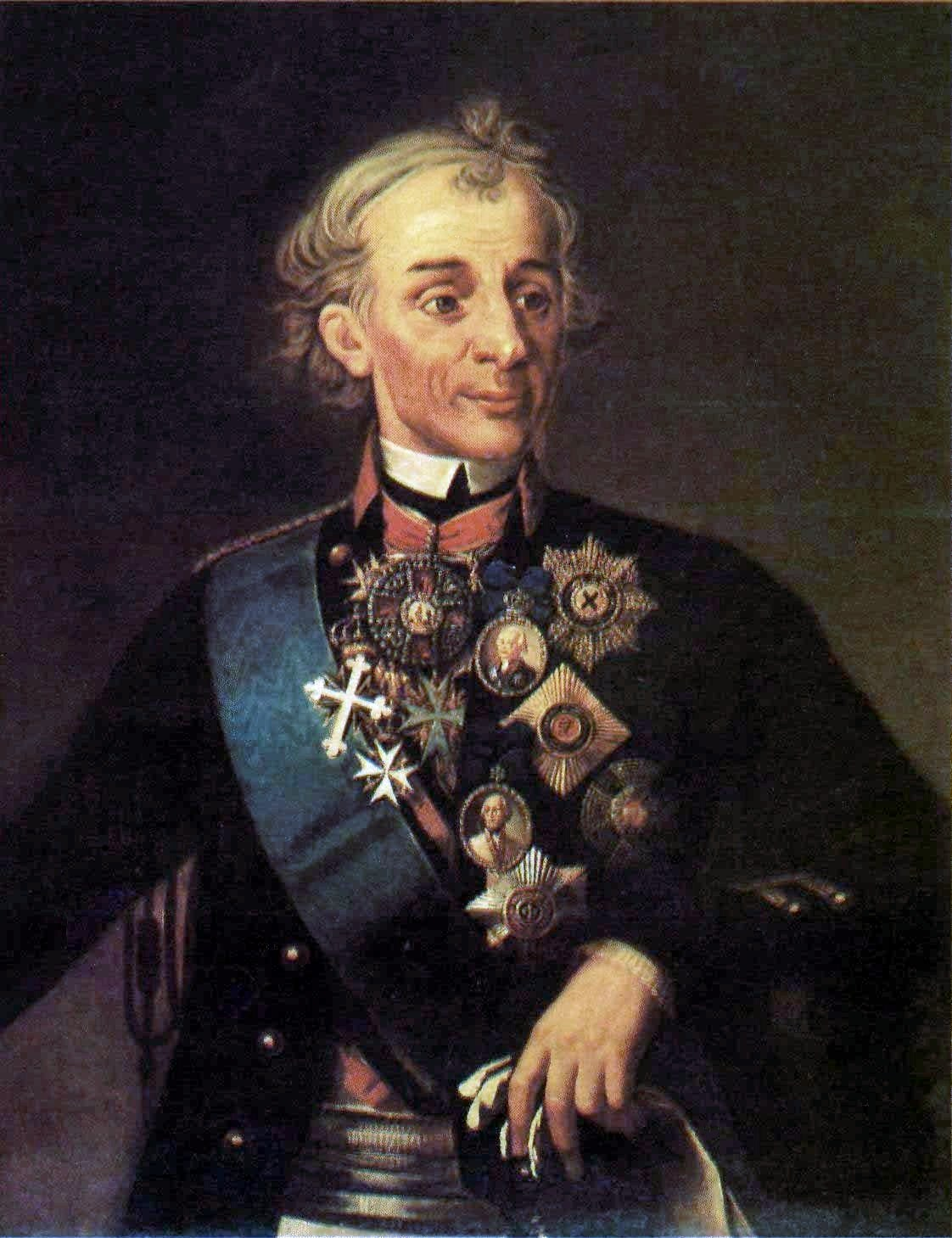
Russian General Alexander Suvorov (1730-1800) with the Order of Saint Lazarus knight cross

== External link ==
- Moeller, Charles (1910). "Order of St. Lazarus of Jerusalem" . Catholic Encyclopedia. Vol. 9.
