= William Bagot (politician) =

Politician and administrator under Richard II

Sir William Bagot (died 1407) was a politician and administrator under Richard II.

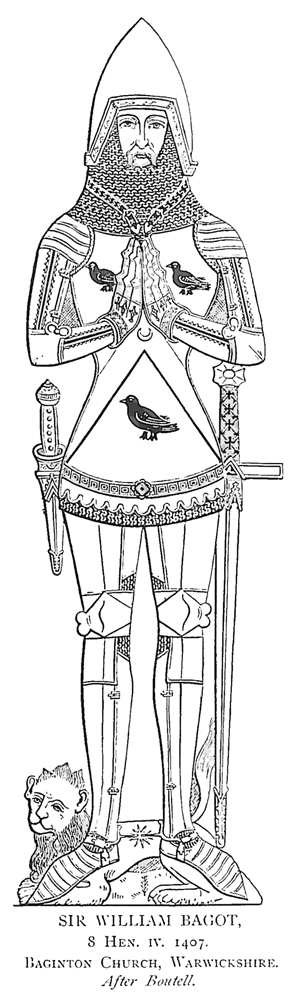

William Bagot was a Warwickshire man who began his career in politics in Warwickshire under the Earl of Warwick. In addition, he also served both John of Gaunt and his son Henry Bolingbroke, as well as Thomas de Mowbray, 1st Duke of Norfolk, future Duke of Norfolk. He was knighted by 1386. He was appointed High Sheriff of Leicestershire and Warwickshire jointly for 1382/3 and attended Parliament as a Knight of the Shire for Warwickshire 11 times between 1388 and 1402.

He became one of Richard II's "continual councillors" together with Sir John Bussy and Sir Henry Green. The three continual councillors acquired an infamous reputation.

He was tasked by Richard in 1399 with the other two councillors and Treasurer William le Scrope, 1st Earl of Wiltshire, to assist the Duke of York in protecting the realm during his forthcoming military expedition to Ireland. The exiled and dispossessed Henry Bolingbroke seized the opportunity to return to England and forcibly recover his inheritance. Bussy, Green, and Scrope were captured when Bristol Castle surrendered to Henry and summarily tried and executed the next day. Bagot managed to escape to Ireland but was eventually captured and brought to London for trial. He was treated lightly by King Henry (as he was by then) and only imprisoned for a year.

He died at his Warwickshire home on 6 September 1407. He had married by 1379, Margaret, sister and heiress of Robert Whatton of Nottinghamshire; they had 2 daughters. His heir was his daughter Isabel, who married Thomas Stafford. Brasses of William and Margaret can be seen in Baginton Church, Warwickshire.

He appears as a character in Shakespeare's play Richard II.
