= Henry Christopher Wise =

Henry Christopher Wise may refer to:

- Henry Christopher Wise (politician) (1806–1883), English Conservative politician
- Henry Christopher Wise (British Army officer) (1829–1854), his son, highest-ranking British soldier who died in the Eureka rebellion

== See also ==
- Henry Wise (disambiguation)
