= Hardy baronets of Dunstall Hall (1876) =

- Escutcheon of the Hardy baronets of Dunstall Hall
- Creation date: 1876
- Status: extinct
- Extinction date: 2017
- Seat: Dunstall Hall
- Motto: Armé de foi hardi (armed with brave faith)
- Arms: Argent, on a bend invected plain cottised Gules, three Catherinewheels Or; on a chief of the second as many leopards' faces of the Third.
- Crest: A dexter arm embowed in armour Proper, garnished Or, entwined by a branch of oak Vert, charged with two catherine-wheels, the one above, the other below the elbow Gules, the hand grasping a dragon's head erased Proper.

The Hardy baronetcy, of Dunstall Hall in the County of Stafford, was created in the Baronetage of the United Kingdom on 23 February 1876 for the politician John Hardy, He had previously represented Midhurst, Dartmouth and Warwickshire South in the House of Commons. He was the son of John Hardy (1773–1855) and the elder brother of Gathorne Gathorne-Hardy, 1st Earl of Cranbrook.

The 2nd Baronet was High Sheriff of Staffordshire in 1893. The title became extinct on the death without a male heir of the 5th Baronet in 2017.

== Hardy baronets, of Dunstall Hall (1876) ==
- Sir John Hardy, 1st Baronet (1809–1888)
- Sir Reginald Hardy, 2nd Baronet (1848–1938)
- Sir Bertram Hardy, 3rd Baronet (1877–1953)
- Sir Rupert John Hardy, 4th Baronet (1902–1997)
- Sir Richard Charles Chandos Hardy, 5th Baronet (1945–2017), left no heir.

== Notes ==
Baronetage of the United Kingdom
Preceded by Greenall baronets	Hardy baronets of Dunstall Hall; 23 February 1876	Succeeded by Walrond baronets
