= Sir John Hardy, 1st Baronet =

British politician (1809–1888)

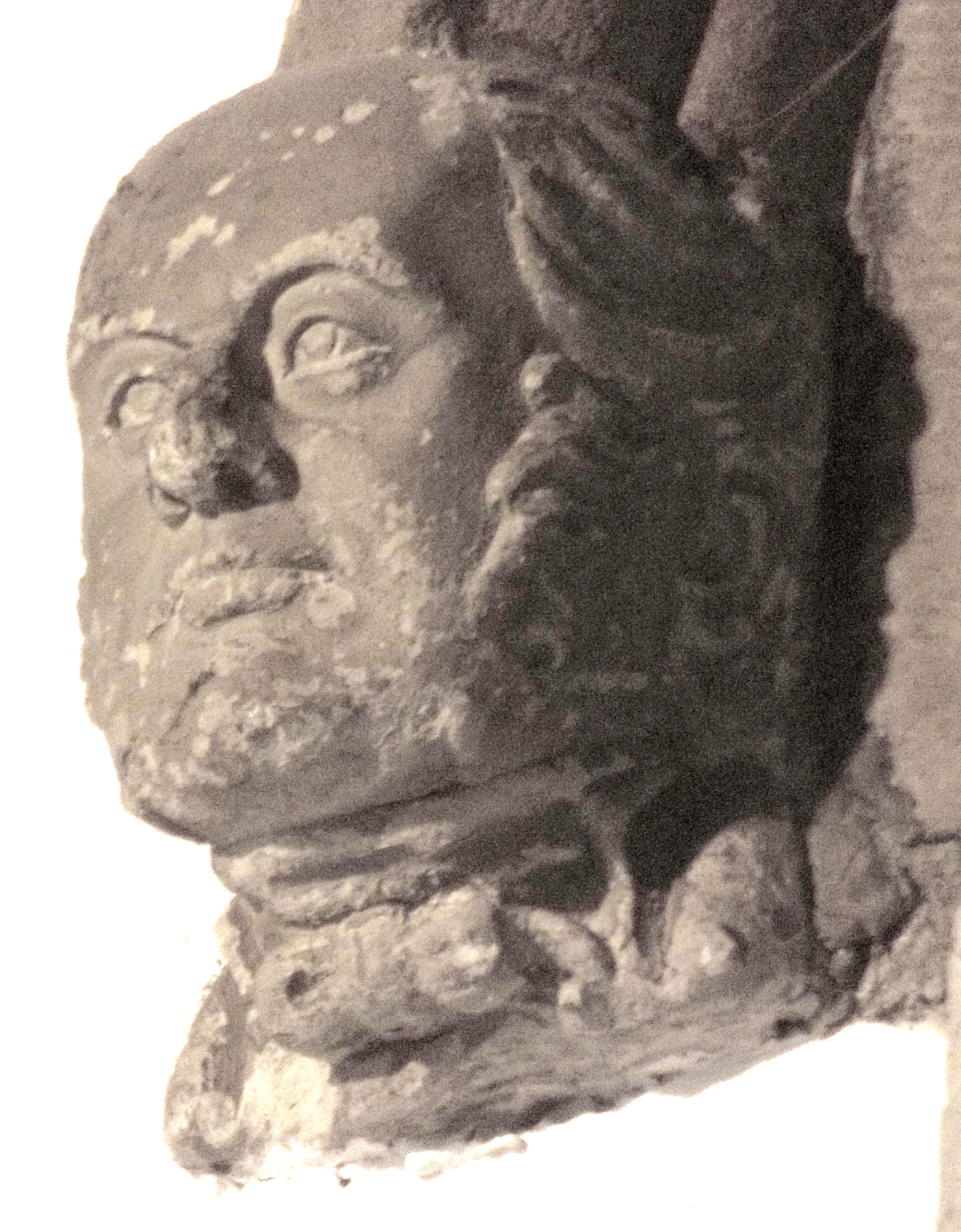
Sculpture of John Hardy MP

Sir John Hardy, 1st Baronet (23 February 1809 – 9 July 1888), was a British Conservative Member of Parliament.

== Background ==
Hardy, born 23 April 1809, was the eldest son of John Hardy and Isabele Gathorne. Gathorne Gathorne-Hardy, 1st Earl of Cranbrook, was his younger brother. He attended Oriel College, Oxford, gaining a BA in 1831, and a MA in 1834. On 13 June 1846 at Farnborough Church, Warwickshire, he married Laura Holbech or Holbeck, third daughter of William Holbech of Farnborough Hall, Warwickshire. At Low Moor, Bradford, the "roaring of cannon" and the "merry note of village bells" continued throughout the day. At 4.30pm the event was celebrated by 40 agents of the Low Moor Ironworks at Buttershaw House, with many toasts and speeches. The cannon "poured forth their voices of thunder" once more at nine pm.

The eldest of their three surviving sons was Sir Reginald Hardy (1848–1938), a JP and deputy lieutenant for Staffordshire, who succeeded to the baronetcy. A younger son was barrister Gerald Holbeck Hardy (Atherstone 1852 – Burton-upon-Trent 1929) of Arlington Street, Piccadilly. Gerald served as a major in the Queen's Own Royal Regiment, Staffordshire, in 1914. Another son was Laurence Hardy, Member of Parliament for Ashford from 1892 to 1918.

== Career ==
Hardy was the proprietor of the Low Moor Ironworks, Bradford. He was elected to the House of Commons for Midhurst in March 1859, but held the seat for less than two months. The following year he was returned for Dartmouth, a constituency he represented until 1868, and then sat for Warwickshire South from 1868 to 1874. His three unsuccessful attempts at representation were Plymouth (1857), Banbury (1859) and East Staffordshire (1880).

On 23 February 1876 he was created baronet of Dunstall Hall in the County of Stafford. In 1878 he was appointed High Sheriff of Staffordshire, after serving there as deputy lieutenant and magistrate, and on the Commission of the Peace for the West Riding of Yorkshire.

== Death ==
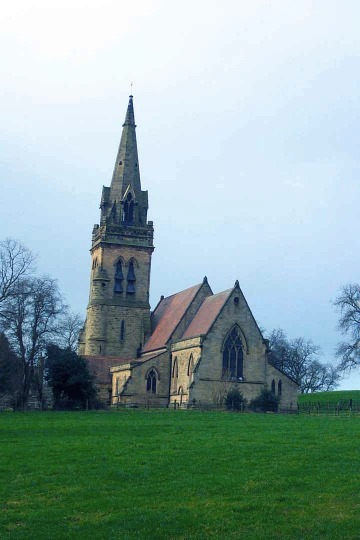
St Mary Dunstall where Hardy is buried

John Hardy died aged 79 years on Monday 2 July 1888, after being hit by a brougham in windy weather and busy traffic while crossing South Audley Street, London, to post a letter. He sustained a compound fracture of the right femur, was placed on the floor of the brougham and taken the short distance to 22 South street, Park Lane. The wound did not begin to heal, and he died at home on the afternoon of 9 July 1888 of shock and exhaustion. The coroner's enquiry found that Hardy was of sound mind and that the driver of the brougham was not to blame. The funeral took place at 2 o'clock on Friday 13 July, at Dunstall Hall. He was buried in a plain oak coffin on the same day at St Mary's Church, Dunstall, in the graveyard outside the east end of the chancel, beside the grave of his wife Laura. The grave is "simply turfed at the head and sides." The funeral cortege walked from Dunstall Hall to the churchyard, and included local school children. Every blind in the village was closed in mourning, and local flags flew at half mast.

== See also ==
- Gathorne Gathorne-Hardy, 1st Earl of Cranbrook
- Hardy baronets
- Dunstall Hall

Parliament of the United Kingdom
Preceded by Samuel Warren	Member of Parliament for Midhurst; March 1859 – April 1859	Succeeded by William Townley Mitford
Preceded by John Dunn	Member of Parliament for Dartmouth; 1860–1868	Constituency abolished
Preceded by Sir Charles Mordaunt; Henry Christopher Wise	Member of Parliament for Warwickshire South; 1868–1874; With: Henry Christopher Wise	Succeeded by Earl of Yarmouth; Sir John Eardley-Wilmot
Honorary titles
Preceded by Henry Hodgetts-Foley	High Sheriff of Staffordshire; 1878	Succeeded by Augustus East Manley
Baronetage of the United Kingdom
New creation	Baronet (of Dunstall Hall); 1876–1888	Succeeded by Reginald Hardy
