= Laurence Hardy =

British politician (1854-1933)

Laurence Hardy PC
- Hardy in 1895

Member of Parliament for Ashford
- In office 1892–1918
- Preceded by: William Pomfret
- Succeeded by: Samuel Strang Steel

Personal details
- Born: 14 April 1854
- Died: 21 January 1933 (aged 78)
- Party: Conservative
- Spouse: Evelyn Wood (m. 1886)
- Children: 3
- Parent: Sir John Hardy, 1st Baronet (father)
- Education: Eton College
- Alma mater: Christ Church, Oxford

Laurence Hardy, PC (14 April 1854 – 21 January 1933) was a Conservative Party British politician. He was a member of parliament (MP) for Ashford from 1892 to 1918.

== Biography ==
Hardy was the fourth son of Sir John Hardy, 1st Baronet, of Dunstall Hall, and was educated at Eton and Christ Church, Oxford, where he took first-class honours in history.

He was elected to the House of Commons in 1892, representing Ashford as a Conservative. He was Deputy Chairman of Ways and Means from 1905 to 1906, and was sworn of the Privy Council in 1911.

From 1917 to 1920, he was a member of the Defence of the Realm Losses Commission. He was an Ecclesiastical Commissioner from 1918 and Seneschal of Canterbury Cathedral from 1930.

== Family ==
Hardy married Evelyn Wood, daughter of J. G. Wood of Thedden Grange, Alton, in 1886; she died in 1911. They had two sons and a daughter.

Parliament of the United Kingdom
Preceded by William Pomfret	Member of Parliament for Ashford; 1892–1918	Succeeded by Samuel Strang Steel
