= Sir Thomas Skipwith, 4th Baronet =

English politician

Sir Thomas George Skipwith, 4th Baronet (c. 1735 – 28 January 1790) of Newbold Revel Hall was an English politician who sat in the House of Commons from 1769 to 1784.

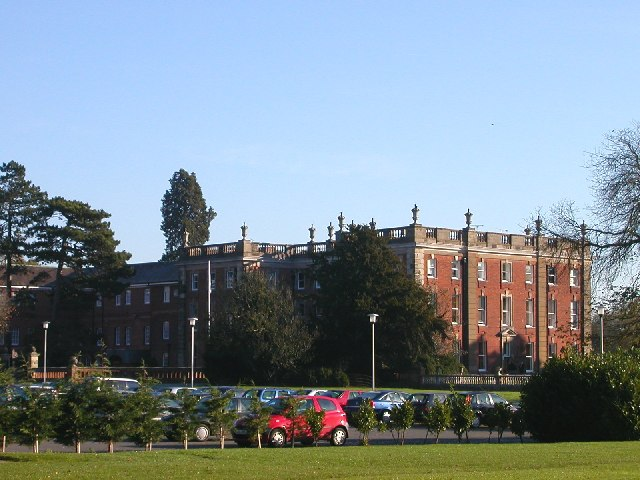
Newbold Revel, Warwickshire

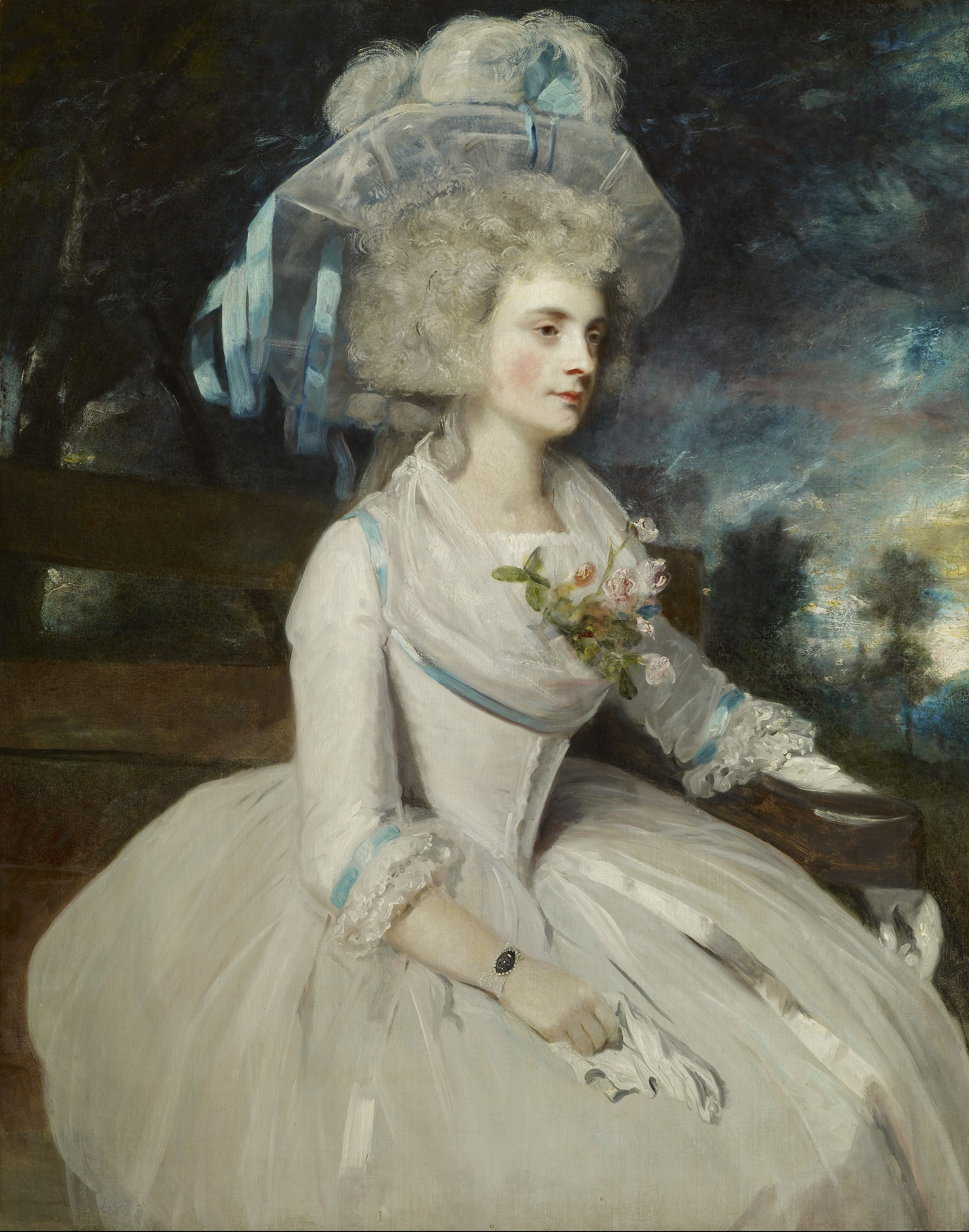
Selina, Lady Skipwith, 1787

He was the eldest son of Sir Francis Skipwith, 3rd Baronet (c. 1705–1778), of Newbold Revel. His mother Ursula, was the daughter of Thomas Cartwright MP, from Northamptonshire; her brother was William Cartwright MP. Skipwith was educated at Rugby School and at Trinity College, Cambridge.

He was elected as a Member of Parliament (MP) for Warwickshire at a by-election in 1769, to fill the vacancy caused by the death of William Throckmorton Bromley MP. A former member of the Birmingham Bean Club, he had been recommended in 1764 as a sound Tory, but fell in with the Rockingham Whigs and voted consistently with that faction. He was re-elected in 1774, but refused to stand again in 1780, when he was returned for the borough of Steyning in Sussex. He had been given that seat by Sir John Honywood, but the two men fell out and Skipwith was not re-elected in 1784.

He died in 1790. In 1785 he had married Selina, daughter of George Shirley and granddaughter of the 1st Earl Ferrers. They had no children, and the baronetcy which he inherited from his father in 1778 became extinct on his death. His estates were left to his relative Sir Grey Skipwith, 8th Baronet.

Parliament of Great Britain
Preceded by Sir Charles Mordaunt, Bt; William Throckmorton Bromley	Member of Parliament for Warwickshire; 1769–1780; With: Sir Charles Mordaunt, Bt to 1774; Sir Charles Holte, Bt 1774–80	Succeeded by Sir Robert Lawley, Bt; Sir George Shuckburgh, Bt
Preceded by Thomas Edwards-Freeman; Filmer Honywood	Member of Parliament for Steyning; 1780–1784; With: Filmer Honywood to November 1780; Colonel John Bullock November 1780 – 1784	Succeeded by Richard Howard; Sir John Honywood, Bt
Baronetage of England
Preceded by Francis Skipwith	Baronet (of Newbold Hall); 1778–1790	extinct
