= Sir Charles Mordaunt, 8th Baronet =

English politician

Sir Charles Mordaunt, 8th Baronet (5 January 1771 – 30 May 1823) was an English politician. He represented the constituency of Warwickshire in 1804–1820.

He was one of the Mordaunt baronets, succeeding Sir John Mordaunt, 7th Baronet to the title. He was succeeded by his only son Sir John Mordaunt, 9th Baronet.

Parliament of the United Kingdom
Preceded by Sir George Shuckburgh, Bt; Dugdale Stratford Dugdale	Member of Parliament for Warwickshire; 1804–1820; With: Dugdale Stratford Dugdale	Succeeded by Dugdale Stratford Dugdale; Francis Lawley
Baronetage of England
Preceded by John Mordaunt	Baronet (of Massingham Parva); 1806–1823	Succeeded by John Mordaunt
