= Grey Skipwith =

Sir Grey Skipwith, 8th Baronet (17 September 1771 – 13 May 1852) was an English Whig politician from Warwickshire.

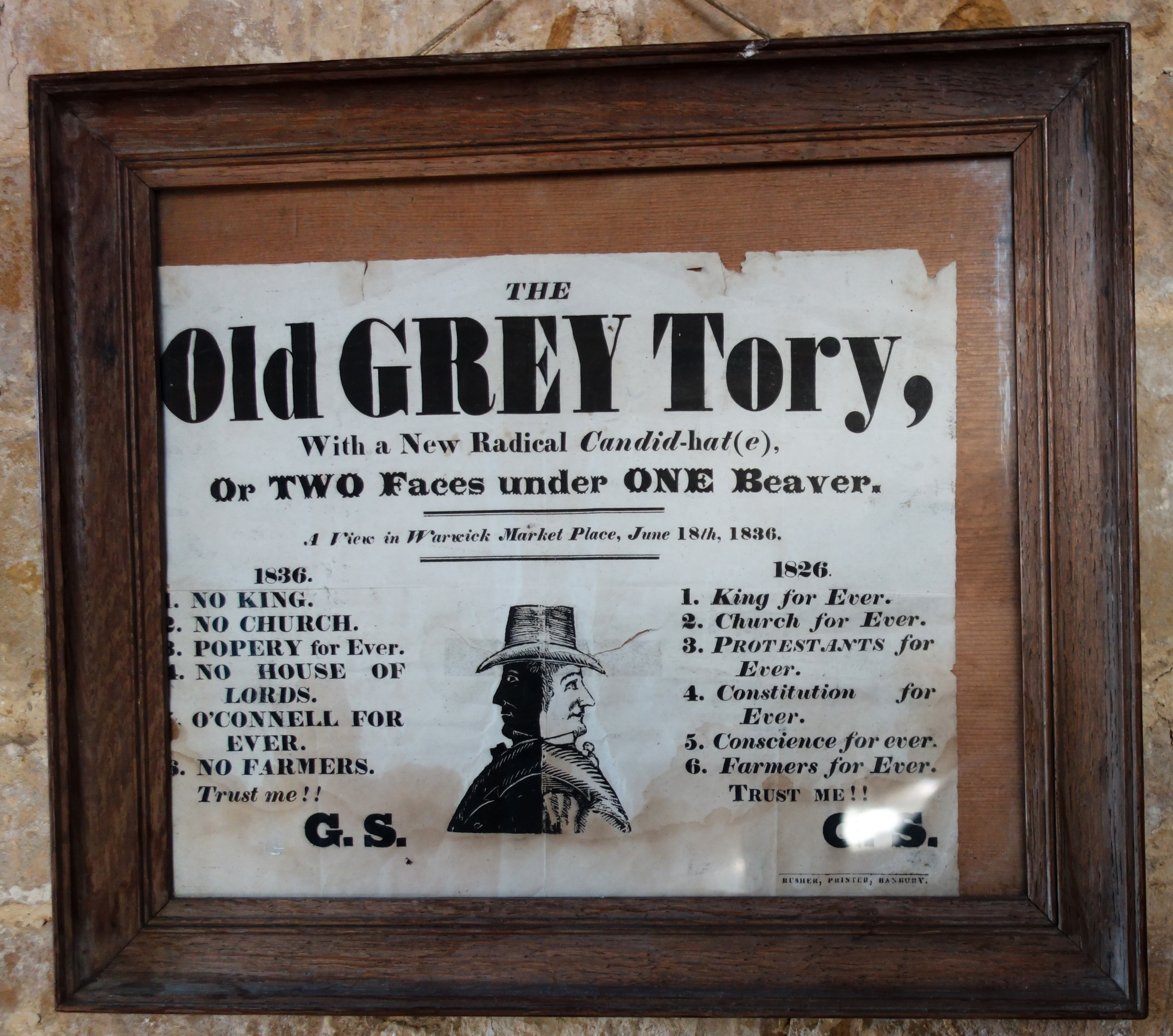
Election poster attacking Skipwith as "The Old Grey Tory"

He was the eldest son of Sir Peyton Skipwith, 7th Baronet (died 1805), of Mecklenburg County, Virginia. His mother Anne, was the daughter of Hugh Miller of Grenock, Blandford, Virginia.

Skipwith was educated at Eton College and at Trinity College, Cambridge. In 1801 he married Harriett, the daughter of Gore Townsend of Honington Hall, Warwickshire and granddaughter of the 4th Earl of Plymouth; they had 12 sons and 8 daughters. His younger brothers inherited his father's estates in Virginia, but Grey inherited the estates of his relative Sir Thomas Skipwith, 4th Baronet, including Newbold Revel.

He was commissioned as Lieutenant-Colonel Commandant of the 2nd Warwickshire Militia when it was formed in 1803, until its disbandment in 1805.

At the 1831 general election he was elected as a Member of Parliament (MP) for Warwickshire. When the county was divided in 1832 he was elected for the new Southern division of Warwickshire. He stood down in 1835, and then unsuccessfully contested two by-elections: South Warwickshire in 1836 and North Warwickshire in 1837.

Parliament of the United Kingdom
Preceded by Dugdale Stratford Dugdale; Francis Lawley	Member of Parliament for Warwickshire; 1831–1832; With: Francis Lawley	Constituency divided
New constituency	Member of Parliament for South Warwickshire; 1832–1835; With: Sir George Philips, Bt	Succeeded by Edward Sheldon; Sir John Mordaunt, Bt
Baronetage of England
Preceded by Peyton Skipwith	Baronet (of Prestwould); 1805–1852	Succeeded by Thomas George Skipwith
