= Henry Wise =

Henry Wise may refer to:

- Henry Wise (gardener) (1653–1738), English gardener, designer, and nurseryman
- Henry Wise (merchant) (1802–1866), English mariner and merchant
- Henry Wise (publisher) (1835–1922), New Zealand publisher
- Henry A. Wise (1806–1876), Governor of Virginia, U.S. Minister to Brazil
- Henry A. Wise (attorney), United States Attorney for the Southern District of New York
- Henry A. Wise (New York state senator) (1906–1982), New York politician
- Henry Augustus Wise (1819–1869), author and U.S. Naval Officer
- Henry Seiler Wise (1909–1982), United States federal judge
- Henry Wise Jr. (1920–2003), American physician and World War II Tuskegee Airman fighter pilot
- Henry Christopher Wise (politician) (1806–1883), English Conservative politician
- Henry Christopher Wise (British Army officer) (1829–1854), his son, highest-ranking British soldier who died in the Eureka rebellion
- Henry Wise (footballer) (born 2000), English professional footballer
