= Mordaunt baronets =

Title in the Baronetage of England

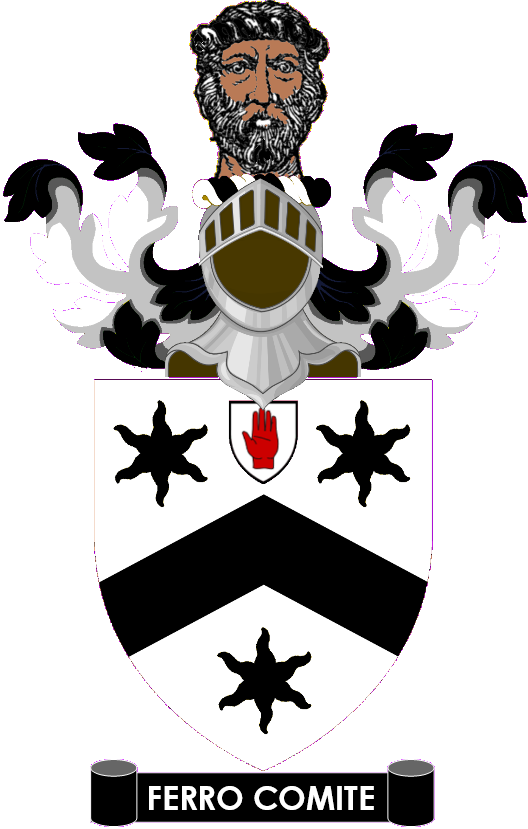
- Crest: A Saracen’s head full-faced Proper wreathed around the temples Argent and Sable.
- Shield: Argent a chevron between three estoiles Sable.
- Motto: Ferro Comite (The Sword My Companion)

The Mordaunt Baronetcy, of Massingham Parva in the County of Norfolk, is a title in the Baronetage of England. It was created on 29 June 1611 for Lestrange Mordaunt, who had earlier distinguished himself in the Wars of the Low Countries during the reign of Elizabeth I. The fifth, sixth, seventh and eighth Baronets all represented Warwickshire in the House of Commons. The ninth and tenth Baronets sat as Members of Parliament for Warwickshire South.

In addition to the Massingham seat, the Mordaunts acquired Walton Hall, Warwickshire, near Wellesbourne, Warwickshire by the marriage in 1541 of Robert Mordaunt to Barbara Lestrange, heiress of Walton.

The family surname is pronounced "Mordant". Massingham Parva is now known as Little Massingham.

== Mordaunt baronets, of Massingham Parva (1611) ==
- Sir Lestrange Mordaunt, 1st Baronet (1572–1627)
- Sir Robert Mordaunt, 2nd Baronet (died 1638)
- Sir Charles Mordaunt, 3rd Baronet (c. 1615–1648)
- Sir Charles Mordaunt, 4th Baronet (c. 1638–1665)
- Sir John Mordaunt, 5th Baronet (died 1721)
- Sir Charles Mordaunt, 6th Baronet (c. 1697–1778)
- Sir John Mordaunt, 7th Baronet (1734–1806)
- Sir Charles Mordaunt, 8th Baronet (1771–1823)
- Sir John Mordaunt, 9th Baronet (1808–1845)
- Sir Charles Mordaunt, 10th Baronet (1836–1897)
- Sir Osbert L'Estrange Mordaunt, 11th Baronet (1884–1934)
- Sir Henry Mordaunt, 12th Baronet (1867–1939)
- Sir Nigel John Mordaunt, 13th Baronet (1907–1979)
- Sir Richard Nigel Charles Mordaunt, 14th Baronet (born 1940)

The heir apparent to the baronetcy is Kim John Mordaunt (born 1966), only son of the 14th Baronet.

== Notes ==
Baronetage of England
Preceded by Hussey baronets	Mordaunt baronets 29 June 1611	Succeeded by Bendish baronets
