= Birmingham Bean Club =

The Birmingham Bean Club was a loyalist dining club founded in Birmingham, England shortly after the Restoration of the monarchy in 1660, serving as a forum for confidential discussion between the leading Tory citizens of the growing industrial town and the gentlemen of the surrounding counties. It both reflected and encouraged the 18th century establishment of Birmingham as the political hub of the surrounding region, seeking to accommodate the political implications of the development of Birmingham within the framework of the 18th century constitution. By the end of the century the club was described as including "representatives of the Magnates of the County, the Gentlemen and Tradespeople of the town, the Clergy and the officers from the Barracks, and the principal representative actors from the local theatre".

In a town with a tradition of Radicalism and an influential Nonconformist minority, the Bean Club was strongly Tory and exclusively Anglican. No Dissenter was ever admitted, and its membership excluded not just influential local Whig aristocrats such as the Earl of Warwick, the Earl of Conway and Lord Archer, but also more moderate Tories such as the Earl of Aylesford, and influential conservative Birmingham Anglicans who were closely associated with Dissenters, such as Matthew Boulton and Samuel Garbett.

== Re-established ==
The club was re-established in May 1749 and quickly built up a national importance. Its leading figures – Lord Craven, Lord Leigh and, from the mid-1750s, the Earl of Denbigh – effectively controlled the selection of Members of Parliament for Warwickshire during the early and mid 18th century. The 1750s and 1760s were difficult times for Toryism nationwide, however, and the club's fortunes reflected this. Meetings were cut back from weekly to monthly in 1753, and in 1759 they were further reduced to annual occasions. This era also saw strained relations between the Birmingham and country members: only 42 of the 387 members in 1755 were from Birmingham and there is evidence of tension between the groups. Most notably, no attempt was made to elect Samuel Aris when he succeeded his father Thomas Aris as editor of the conservative Birmingham Gazette in 1761.

The Bean Club was reinvigorated after the dramatic election of Thomas Skipwith – a disaffected Bean Club member – to one of the Warwickshire county seats with the votes of the Birmingham freeholders in 1769, as Birmingham's electoral influence was made clear and the leading county Tories made renewed efforts to reach an accommodation with the town. 56 new members were elected to the club between 1770 and 1773 – more than during the entire previous decade – and 36 of these came from Birmingham, including Samuel Aris in 1770. The frequency of meetings was increased to quarterly in 1771. The club's members became increasingly influential in the government of the town over the following decades – eight members of the Street Commissioners elected in 1769 were Bean Club members, as were seven of the committee of the Birmingham General Hospital in 1765, and members were prominent among the subscribers to Birmingham's Anglican Sunday Schools.

The club also took a leading role in the establishment of the "Birmingham interest" as a force in regional politics after 1774. All of the Members of Parliament for Warwickshire elected between 1769 and 1782 on the back of the strength of the Birmingham freeholders' vote were County Stewards of the Bean Club – Skipwith, Sir Charles Holte, Sir George Shuckburgh and Robert Lawley. Neither were the Bean Club's interests were not confined to Warwickshire. Edward Foley and William Lygon, both Members of Parliament for Worcestershire, served as county stewards in 1784, by which time members lived as far away as Bridgnorth in Shropshire, Stone and Burton on Trent in Staffordshire, Stoke in Herefordshire, Malvern in Worcestershire, Appleby in Leicestershire and Daventry in Northamptonshire.

Although the society claimed in 1769 to be "ever devoted to the support of Liberty and Independence", the opinions of members were split over the American War of Independence, and adopted an increasingly conservative outlook over the course of the 1770s. By the 1790s Bean Club members were closely involved in the formation of loyalist associations in the wake of the Priestley riots, such as the Birmingham Church and King Club founded in 1792.

== Bibliography ==
- Money, John (1977), Experience and identity: Birmingham and the West Midlands, 1760–1800, Manchester University Press, ISBN 978-0-7190-0672-2
- Wilson, Adrian (2002), "The Birmingham General Hospital and its Public, 1765–79", in Sturdy, Steve (ed.), Medicine, Health and the Public Sphere in Britain, 1600–2000, Routledge Studies in the Social History of Medicine, vol. 16, London: Routledge, pp. 85–106, ISBN 978-0-415-27906-2
