= Listed buildings in Dunstall =

Dunstall is a civil parish in the district of East Staffordshire, Staffordshire, England. It contains 13 buildings that are recorded in the National Heritage List for England. Of these, two are listed at Grade II*, the middle grade, and the others are at Grade II, the lowest grade. The parish contains the village of Dunstall and the surrounding countryside. The Trent and Mersey Canal passes through the eastern part of the parish and associated with this are a roving bridge and a milepost, and there is also a listed milepost nearby on the A38 road. The other listed buildings include a country house and associated structures, a smaller house, farmhouses and farm buildings, a church, and a former school.

== Key ==
| Grade | Criteria |
|---|---|
| II* | Particularly important buildings of more than special interest |
| II | Buildings of national importance and special interest |

== Buildings ==
| Name and location | Photograph | Date | Notes | Grade |
|---|---|---|---|---|
| Newbold Manor House; 52.76855°N 1.69944°W | — | Late 18th century | A farmhouse in red brick with a hipped slate roof. There is a double-depth rectangular plan, three storeys, a front of three bays, and sides of two bays. The central doorway has half-round pilasters and an open pediment, and the windows are sashes. | II |
| Canal Milepost; 52.77656°N 1.69034°W | | 1819 | The milepost is on the towpath of the Trent and Mersey Canal. It is in cast iron, and consists of a circular post with a moulded head and two convex tablets. On the tablets are inscribed the distances in miles to Shardlow and to Preston Brook, and the date and details of the maker are on the shaft. | II |
| Canal Bridge No 36; 52.77198°N 1.69197°W | | Early 19th century | A roving bridge over the Trent and Mersey Canal. It is in red brick with dressings in blue brick, and stone coping. The bridge consists of a single segmental arch with convex sides, and the parapet is swept over the span. | II |
| Dunstall Hall and orangery 52.78136°N 1.71896°W | | Early 19th century | A country house that was extended later in the 19th century, it is built in stone, and has a cornice, a balustraded parapet, and a flat roof. There is an L-shaped plan; the garden front on the east has two storeys and ten bays, the middle four bays recessed. The entrance front at the south has a tetrastyle porte-cochère with Ionic columns and a fretted parapet. Above this a frieze, a pediment, and an attic tower, to the right is one bay, to the left are two bays, and further to the left is a seven-bay ballroom wing. The windows are sashes. To the north of the garden front is a seven-bay orangery with semicircular-headed windows. | II* |
| Carriage arch, Dunstall Hall; 52.78129°N 1.71960°W | — | Early 19th century | The carriage arch is in rusticated stone, and consists of a single semicircular arch on a plinth. It has moulded voussoirs, a fluted keystone on fluted impost bands, a dentilled cornice, and a moulded pediment. On the angles are ball finials, and there is a rusticated plaque in the tympanum. | II |
| Lower Farmhouse; 52.77744°N 1.70789°W | — | Early 19th century | A red brick farmhouse with dentilled eaves and a tile roof. There are two storeys and an attic, and a rectangular plan with a front of three bays. The central doorway has flat pilasters, a fanlight and a hood, and the windows are sashes with painted wedge heads. | II |
| Old Hall Farmhouse; 52.78035°N 1.73092°W | — | Early 19th century | The farmhouse is in red brick with a hipped slate roof. There are two storeys, and a T-shaped plan with a front of three bays and a rear wing. In the centre is a porch with angle pilasters and a hipped roof, and above the door is a fanlight. On the front the windows are sashes, and in the rear wing they are top-hung casements. | II |
| Farm buildings, Old House Farm; 52.78088°N 1.73030°W | — | Early 19th century | The farm buildings to the east of the farmhouse include stables and a hayloft, cow houses, implement sheds, and a horse engine house. They are in red brick and have hipped tile roofs, other than a shed with a slate roof. The whole complex forms an irregular H-shaped plan, the horse engine house having an apsidal plan. The openings include stable doors, hayloft doors, a cart door, and pitching holes. | II |
| Implement shed, Old House Farm; 52.78051°N 1.72983°W | — | Early 19th century | The shed is in red brick with a hipped tile roof. There is one storey and seven bays. The front is open with two steel and three cast iron columns. | II |
| Milepost; 52.77602°N 1.68368°W | | 19th century | The milepost is on the east side of the A38 road. It is in cast iron and has a triangular plan and a sloping top. On the top is the name of the parish, and below are the distances to Alrewas, Lichfield, and Burton upon Trent. | II |
| Church School; 52.78101°N 1.72425°W | | 1852–53 | The school, later used for other purposes, was designed by Henry Clutton. It is in Hollington sandstone, and has a tile roof with verge parapets. The building consists of a schoolroom with an attached lean-to range. Most of the windows are mullioned casements, the window in the south gable end has five lights and is mullioned and transomed, and there is a hipped dormer. | II |
| St Mary's Church; 52.78121°N 1.72361°W | | 1852–53 | The church, designed by Henry Clutton is built in Hollington sandstone with tile roofs. It consists of a nave, a south aisle, a south porch, a chancel with a north vestry, and a southwest steeple. The steeple has a tower with three stages, diagonal buttresses, a circular stair turret, a corbelled cornice, gargoyles, and a fretted parapet with flying buttresses to a broach spire that has large gabled lucarnes. | II* |
| Home Farmhouse and farm buildings 52.78130°N 1.72085°W | | 1858 | The buildings are in red brick with stone dressings, quoins and tile roofs with coped verges. On the front is a carriage arch with buttresses and a pointed arch, over which is a mullioned window and a plaque in a gable. The house to the right has two storeys, three bays, a doorway with a fanlight and mullioned casement windows. The farm building to the left has four two-light mullioned windows and quatrefoil vents, and at the end a gable with a two-light trefoil-headed window. There are two wings at the rear. | II |
