= William Pomfret =

English banker and Conservative politician

William Pomfret Pomfret (1823 – 11 August 1902) was an English banker and Conservative politician who sat in the House of Commons from 1885 to 1892.

Pomfret was born as William Pomfret Burra, the son of William Burra of Ashford, Kent and his wife Mary Catharine Pomfret, only child of John Butler Pomfret of Tenterden, Kent. He was educated at Shrewsbury School and Tonbridge School. On 2 October 1882 Burra was granted a Royal Licence allowing him to assume the surname Pomfret in lieu of Burra, and to quarter the Pomfret arms with his own.

By 1885 he had become the senior partner in the Ashford Bank, was a magistrate for Kent, and was living at Godinton Park, outside the town.

At the 1885 general election he was elected as Conservative Member of Parliament for Ashford. He held the seat at the 1886 general election, retiring prior to the next election in 1892.

Pomfret died at Mystole, near Canterbury in August 1902.

Pomfret married firstly in 1853, Isabella Nottidge, daughter of George Nottidge of Yardley Lodge, Tunbridge, Kent and secondly in 1878, Flora Rose Hore, daughter of Charles Frederick Hore of Hilden, Beckenham.

Parliament of the United Kingdom
New constituency	Member of Parliament for Ashford; 1885–1892	Succeeded by Laurence Hardy
