= Sir George Philips, 1st Baronet =

British politician

Sir George Philips, 1st Baronet (24 March 1766 – 3 October 1847) was an English textile industrialist and politician. He was closely associated with Manchesterism and has been described as the "unofficial member for Manchester", though not formally representing it.

== Biography ==
Philips came from an old Staffordshire family that had held manors there since the reign of Edward VI, and were seated at Heath House in the same county since the early seventeenth century, that continued to be lived in by his cousins. George's father, Thomas Philips (1728–1811) of Sedgley, Lancashire, established a cotton manufacturing company in Manchester.

George attended several schools, including Stand Grammar School. He was brought up in the dissenting tradition. Towards the end of the eighteenth century he joined forces with Samuel Boddington and "Conversation" Sharp (alias Richard Sharp) to form the West India company of 'Boddington, Sharp and Philips' which was based at 15 Mark Lane, London.

As fellow Dissenters, the three partners shared many common interests. Philips enjoyed writing poetry and he was especially pleased with his Epistle from Windemere to Richd. Sharp Esq., which was proudly shown to such friends as James Mackintosh, Samuel Rogers, and William Wordsworth. Boddington and Philips followed Sharp's example by becoming dissenting Whig Members of Parliament and in time Philips gained a reputation for his fine oratory, speaking in the House on several occasions in opposition to regulating child labour in the cotton mills.

In Parliament he sat as a Whig and represented Ilchester 1812, Steyning 1818–1820, Wootton Bassett 1820–30. Philips was an MP for Warwickshire South following the Reform Act until 1835.

He is pictured in a commemorative painting by Sir George Hayter of the 1833 parliament.

== Weston House ==
As his wealth grew (Sydney Smith teasingly nicknamed him "King Cotton"), Philips left the family home in Manchester, Sedgley Hall, and built Weston House in Warwickshire. It was the work of James Trubshaw to the design of Edward Blore, constructed from 1826 to 1833, and was fitted out by Augustus Pugin. The building was demolished in 1932.

== Works ==
Under the influence of Thomas Cooper, Philips wrote a pamphlet The Necessity of a Speedy and Effectual Reform in Parliament, published 28 January 1793. It included advocacy of votes for women, and was criticised. Philips then retracted it.

== Family ==
Philips married Sarah-Ann, eldest daughter of Nathaniel Philips of Hollinghurst. They had one son, George Richard.

== See also ==
- J. & N. Philips

Parliament of the United Kingdom
Preceded by Richard Brinsley Sheridan; Michael Angelo Taylor	Member of Parliament for Ilchester; 1812–1818; With: Richard Sharp	Succeeded by Sir Isaac Coffin; John William Drage Merest
Preceded by James Martin Lloyd; Sir John Aubrey	Member of Parliament for Steyning; 1818–1820; With: Sir John Aubrey	Succeeded by George Richard Philips; Lord Henry Howard-Molyneux-Howard
Preceded by William Taylor Money; Richard Ellison	Member of Parliament for Wootton Bassett; 1820–1830; With: Horace Twiss	Succeeded by Viscount Mahon; Thomas Hyde Villiers
New constituency	Member of Parliament for South Warwickshire; 1832–1835; With: Sir Grey Skipwith	Succeeded by Sir John Mordaunt; Edward Sheldon
Baronetage of the United Kingdom
New creation	Baronet (of Weston, Warwickshire); 1828–1847	Succeeded by George Richard Philips
