= Sir John Mordaunt, 9th Baronet =

English politician

Sir John Mordaunt, 9th Baronet (24 August 1808 – 27 September 1845) was an English politician.

He was appointed High Sheriff of Warwickshire in 1833 and represented the constituency of South Warwickshire. from 1835 to 1845.

He was one of the Mordaunt Baronets, succeeding his father Sir Charles Mordaunt, 8th Baronet to the title. Upon his death, he was succeeded by his eldest son Sir Charles Mordaunt, 10th Baronet. His younger son was the cricketer John Mordaunt.

Parliament of the United Kingdom
Preceded by Sir Grey Skipwith; Sir George Philips	Member of Parliament for South Warwickshire; 1835–1845; With: Edward Ralph Charles Sheldon 1835–1836; Evelyn Shirley 1836–1845	Succeeded by Evelyn Shirley; Lord Brooke
Honorary titles
Preceded by John Gamaliel Lloyd	High Sheriff of Warwickshire; 1833	Succeeded by Francis Holyoake-Goodricke
Baronetage of England
Preceded by Charles Mordaunt	Baronet (of Massingham Parva); 1823–1845	Succeeded by Charles Mordaunt
