= 1879 South Warwickshire by-election =

UK Parliamentary by-election

The 1879 South Warwickshire by-election was fought on 21 February 1879. The by-election was fought due to the incumbent Conservative MP, Earl of Yarmouth, becoming Comptroller of the Household. It was retained by the unopposed Earl of Yarmouth.
