= Dunstall =

Village in Staffordshire, England

Coordinates: 52.781°N 1.725°W

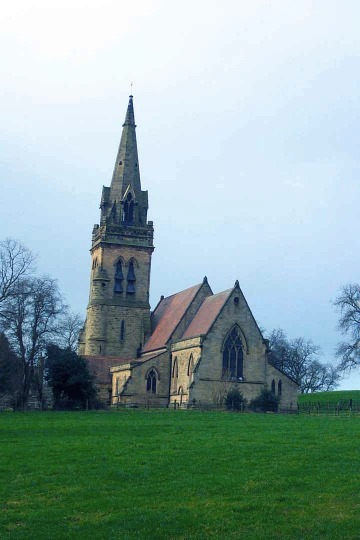
- St. Mary's Church, Dunstall

- Location within Staffordshire
- Population: 209 (2011 census)
- OS grid reference: SK 186204
- District: East Staffordshire
- Shire county: Staffordshire
- Region: West Midlands
- Country: England
- Sovereign state: United Kingdom
- Post town: BURTON-ON-TRENT
- Postcode district: DE13
- Dialling code: 01283
- Police: Staffordshire
- Fire: Staffordshire
- Ambulance: West Midlands
- UK Parliament: Lichfield

Dunstall is a small village and civil parish in the borough of East Staffordshire, Staffordshire, England. It lies between Burton upon Trent and Barton-under-Needwood. The population of the parish at the 2001 census was 215, decreasing to 209 at the 2011 Census.

== History of Dunstall ==
=== Population ===
The population of Dunstall has fluctuated in the past, but not very dramatically. In 1801 it was reported that the population was 177, in 1817 it was 157, in 1821 it was 184 and in 1831 it was 204 showing that the population has always fluctuated in this once registered township. In 1870–72, John Marius Wilson described Dunstall as "a town-ship chapelry" with a population of just 240 residents living in 51 houses; however, while the population has decreased the number of houses has gradually increased with 1950 seeing more than 90 houses and the 2001 census reporting a population of 215. Of the population of 215 reported in 2001, 37 are aged between 0 and 15, 19 are aged between 16 and 24, 51 are aged between 25 and 44 and the largest age group within the population of Dunstall is 45 to 64 with 71 people fitting between this age bracket and just 29 are aged 65 and over. Therefore, the dependent population is smaller than the economically active population, showing Dunstall does not have a large problem with an ageing population unlike the majority of other places within the United Kingdom.

==== Population change in Dunstall ====
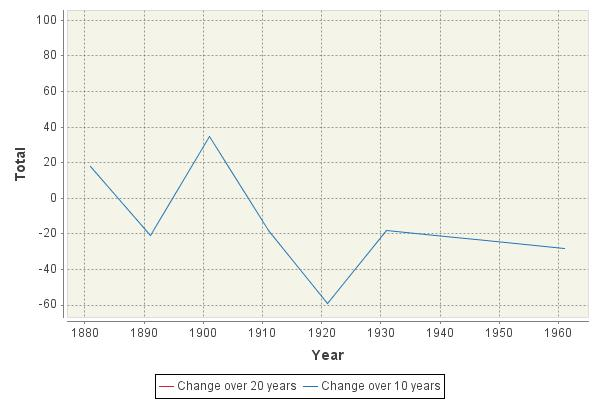

This line graph shows the pattern in the population change of Dunstall dating from 1880 to 1960. The rate of change has fluctuated in Dunstall with the highest amount of change happening between 1900 and 1920, reflecting times of war with possibly people migrating to be in the army and possibly dying during the First World War. There were also high rates of emigration from the United Kingdom to places such as Canada shown in the Canadian census of 1901 where 12.7% of the population were foreign born migrants. The increase in the population is evident and is perhaps a direct result of the decline in infant mortality that was present in the United Kingdom in the late 19th century along with a decrease in fertility rates combined with a higher life expectancy contributing to the age structure of Dunstall as well as the whole of the United Kingdom. However, overall the population of Dunstall seems to be declining but not rapidly.

=== Employment and Revenue ===
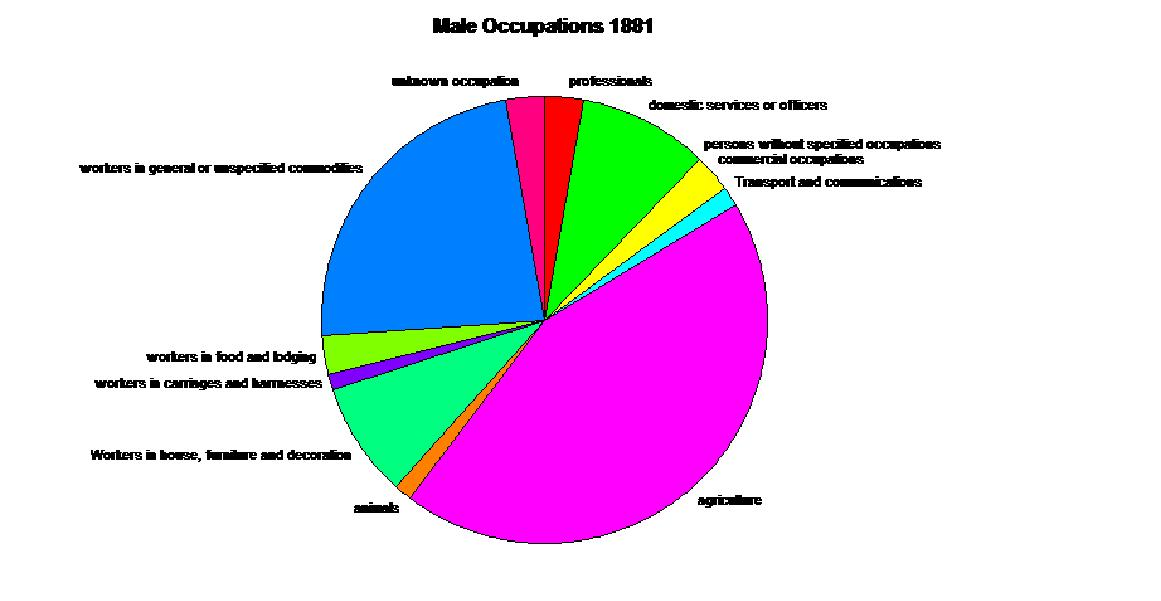

Dunstall historically had a mainly charity based revenue, centred on the church: The common lands were controlled by church wardens in the 1860s who annually sold the grazing's produced and reinvested the money into various community projects, shown in 1907 where Dunstall's income was registered as charity based with allotments being granted to young apprentice's for £5-£10, and these became so popular that rent on these allotments steadily rose from £30 in 1907 to £45 by 1970 to over £350 in the 1990s. Historical records show that Dunstall was predominately an agricultural area with 32 males and 2 females being employed in agriculture, the largest number of people employed in any occupation in 1881. The pie charts show the employment structures of both male and female residents in 1881. It is reported that out of the occupations that are known for women, the largest sector was in domestic service or office, reflecting the role and place for women at the time. In the 2001 census, Dunstall was reported to have 111 economically active residents with 75 of those people being employed in services and 39 being employed in manufacturing and extractive industries. This therefore shows that people are now employed in more service based industries rather than the primary sector, reflecting the development of the United Kingdom and the move away from primary industries.

=== Boundary changes ===
The area known as Dunstall has been adjusted by the boundaries of the parish being changed in line with population fluctuations and therefore land allocations changing due to population demands. 4 changes are known to have taken place and been mapped in response to the changing population and land allocations.

== Places of interest ==
=== Dunstall Hall ===
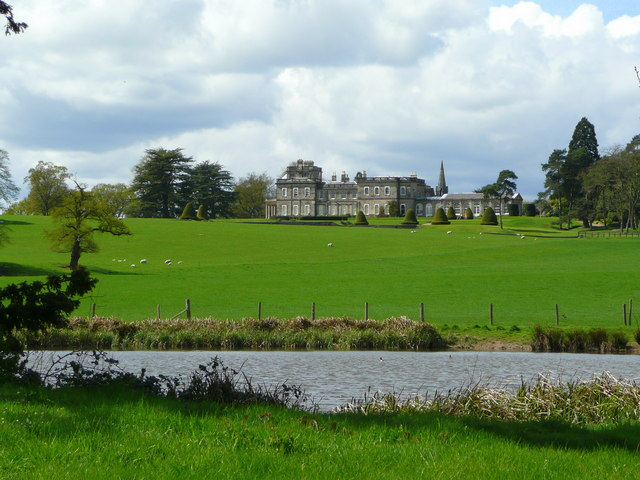
Dunstall Hall and Estate

The parish includes the estate of Dunstall Hall and within the grounds of the estate, Deer Park Cricket Ground, which has been used by Staffordshire and the Derbyshire Cricket Board. It is also a popular destination for weddings and other celebrations after being opened in March 2007 for events of those kinds as well as a venue for business functions. Dunstall Hall is a stone Grade II listed house which has been in the hands of many owners throughout centuries who have inherited land and created Dunstall Hall Estate. Dunstall Estate, which compromises over 1,000 acres of land, has been passed through and bought by seven different families since 1145 and Dunstall Hall that stands today was built on the original foundations of the old Dunstall Hall which was rebuilt in the 1600s. The present owners, Sir Stanley and Lady Clarke, acquired the estate in 1997 after the previous owner died who had carried out a mass refurbishment to an exceptional standard allowing for Dunstall Hall to become the popular destination it is today. One of the previous owners was Charles Arkwright, who had inherited the estate from his father, Richard Arkwright junior. Richard junior was the son of Sir Richard Arkwright; Sir Richard was the inventor in 1764 of the water frame (a component of the first spinning jenny) and was the builder of the first water-powered cotton-spinning mill (at Cromford in Derbyshire). Richard junior purchased the estate as a gift for his son Charles. Richard junior had invested in property and banking after selling his father's mills and left an estate worth approximately £3.5 million (£150 million today) when he died in 1842.

=== Church ===
The parish church of Dunstall, St Mary's, was built to serve the Dunstall Hall estate by the Arkwright family. After their move to Cromford, the new owner of the estate, John Hardy, completed the church in 1853. The Arkwright family pledged £12,000 in total to help build the church, school (which is now the church hall) and a parsonage as Charles had always wanted to have a church in this community, however he died before any stones were laid, leaving the Hardy family to complete his wishes. To show the community's appreciation to John Hardy and his wife Isobel, a stained-glass window was erected and dedicated to their memory. It is a Grade II* listed building with enough seats to house a carol service of approximately 120 people.

Today the church is part of a joint benefice with St James, Barton and St Michael & All Angels, Tatenhill.

== Sport and Leisure ==
=== Cricket ===
Dunstall Cricket Club was founded in the 1870s and reformed in 1960. Their home ground is located on the Dunstall Estate (The Deer Park). The club originally played in the Burton and District Cricket League before they moved to the Derbyshire County Cricket League in 1992. The club was awarded the ECB Clubmark in 2009, and they have a long established Junior training section that play competitive cricket in the Burton & District Youth Cricket League.

Dunstall Cricket Club has been host to former professional cricketers Derek Randall and Devon Malcolm who have played for the England cricket team as well as former West Indies internationals Phil Simmons and Jimmy Adams.

== See also ==
- Listed buildings in Dunstall
