= Sir Charles Mordaunt, 6th Baronet =

English landowner and Tory politician

Sir Charles Mordaunt, 6th Baronet (c. 1697 – 11 March 1778), of Walton d'Eiville in Warwickshire, was an English landowner and Tory politician who sat in the House of Commons for 40 years from 1734 to 1774.

Mordaunt was the eldest son of Sir John Mordaunt, 5th Baronet, of Walton D’Eiville and Little Massingham and his second wife Penelope Warburton, daughter of Sir George Warburton, 1st Baronet, of Arley, Cheshire. He matriculated at New College, Oxford 8 June 1714, aged 16 and Lincoln's Inn on 21 May 1718. Mordaunt married Dorothy Conyers daughter of John Conyers of Walthamstow on 1 December 1720. He succeeded to the baronetcy on 6 September 1721. Mordaunt's wife Dorothy died in 1726, and he married as his second wife Sophia Wodehouse, daughter of Sir John Wodehouse of Kimberley, Norfolk on 7 July 1730.

Mordaunt entered Parliament at a by- election on 6 February 1734 as Member of Parliament (MP) for Warwickshire. He and held the seat for the next forty years, never having to fight a contested election. In the 1750s, Mordaunt was regarded as one of the Tory leaders in the House, and in the early days of George III's reign, when the balance of power was in doubt, both court and opposition made vigorous efforts to win his support; he was eventually won over to the royal cause by his son, John, being appointed a Groom of the Bedchamber. Mordaunt retired from Parliament in 1774, expecting his son to succeed him as MP, but the Birmingham manufacturers put up a rival candidate and he was defeated.

Mordaunt died on 11 March 1778 having had two daughters by his first wife and two sons by his second wife. He was succeeded in the baronetcy by his son John.

Parliament of Great Britain
Preceded by William Peyto; Edward Digby	Member of Parliament for Warwickshire; 1734–1774; With: Edward Digby 1734–46; Hon. William Craven 1746–65; William Throckmorton Bromley 1765–69; Thomas Skipwith 1769–74	Succeeded by Sir Charles Holte; Thomas Skipwith
Baronetage of England
Preceded by John Mordaunt	Baronet (of Massingham Parva); 1721–1778	Succeeded by John Mordaunt
