= William Throckmorton Bromley =

William Throckmorton Bromley (c. 1726 – 3 March 1769) was an English politician, MP for Warwickshire 1765–1769.

== Biography ==
Bromley was the son of William Bromley MP (son of William Bromley MP, Speaker of the House of Commons) and his wife Lucy Throckmorton, daughter of Sir Clement Throckmorton.

He was educated at Westminster School, and matriculated at Christ Church, Oxford in 1744, aged 17.

Bromley was elected MP for Warwickshire in a by-election in February 1765, without a contest. He voted against the repeal of the Stamp Act 1765. He was re-elected in 1768.

He died on 3 March 1769.

=== Family ===
In May 1756, Bromley married Bridget Davenport, daughter of Richard Davenport. They had one son:

- William Davenport Bromley (died 1810)

Parliament of Great Britain
Preceded by Sir Charles Mordaunt, Bt; Hon. William Craven	Member of Parliament for Warwickshire; 1765–1769; With: Sir Charles Mordaunt, Bt	Succeeded by Sir Charles Mordaunt, Bt; Sir Thomas Skipwith, Bt
