= Edward Sheldon (politician) =

English politician

Edward Ralph Charles Sheldon (2 March 1782 – 11 June 1836) was an English politician. He represented the constituency of South Warwickshire from 1835 until his death.

== Life ==
Sheldon was the only son of Ralph Sheldon (1741 – 1822), of Weston in Long Compton in Warwickshire, a convert from Anglicanism to the Church of England, who was MP for Wilton from 1804 to 1822.

Sheldon moved to Brailes House in Warwickshire in 1822, the year of his father's death. He became a magistrate for the counties of Warwickshire and Worcestershire, a Deputy Lieutenant of Warwickshire, and major of the militia of Warwickshire.

He was elected as a Liberal Member of Parliament for South Warwickshire in 1835, representing the seat until his death the next year.

== Family ==
Sheldon married Marcella, daughter of Thomas Meredith Winstanley, of Lissen Hall, County Dublin, on 14 August 1817. They had eight children, five of whom died in childhood.

Sheldon died on 11 June 1836, aged 54. His wife survived him by thirteen years, dying on 23 July 1849. His son, Henry James Sheldon, was High Sheriff of Warwickshire in 1860.

== Notes ==
Parliament of the United Kingdom
Preceded by Sir Grey Skipwith, Bt; Sir George Philips, Bt	Member of Parliament for South Warwickshire; 1835–1836; With: Sir John Mordaunt, Bt	Succeeded by Sir John Mordaunt, Bt; Evelyn Shirley
