= Deer Park, Dunstall =

Cricket ground in Dunstall, Staffordshire, England

Coordinates: 52°46′46″N 1°43′03″W

Deer Park
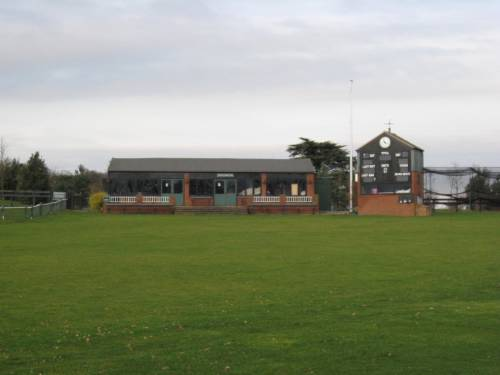

Ground information
- Location: Dunstall, Staffordshire
- Establishment: 1997 (first recorded match)

Team information
Staffordshire	(1998)
Derbyshire Cricket Board	(1999)
- As of 14 August 2010; Source: Ground profile

Deer Park is a cricket ground within the grounds of Dunstall Hall, Dunstall, Staffordshire. The first recorded match on the ground was in 1997, when the Derbyshire Second XI played the Durham Second XI in the Second XI Trophy. The ground held 2 MCCA Knockout Trophy matches in 1999. The first saw the Derbyshire Cricket Board as the home team against Shropshire and the second saw Staffordshire against the Nottinghamshire Cricket Board. The ground has held a number of Second XI Championship and Second XI Trophy matches for the Derbyshire Second XI.

The ground has held a single List-A match which saw the Derbyshire Cricket Board play Wales Minor Counties in the 1999 NatWest Trophy.

In local domestic cricket, Deer Park is the home ground of Dunstall Cricket Club who play in the Derbyshire Premier Cricket League.
