= Sir Robert Hamilton, 6th Baronet =

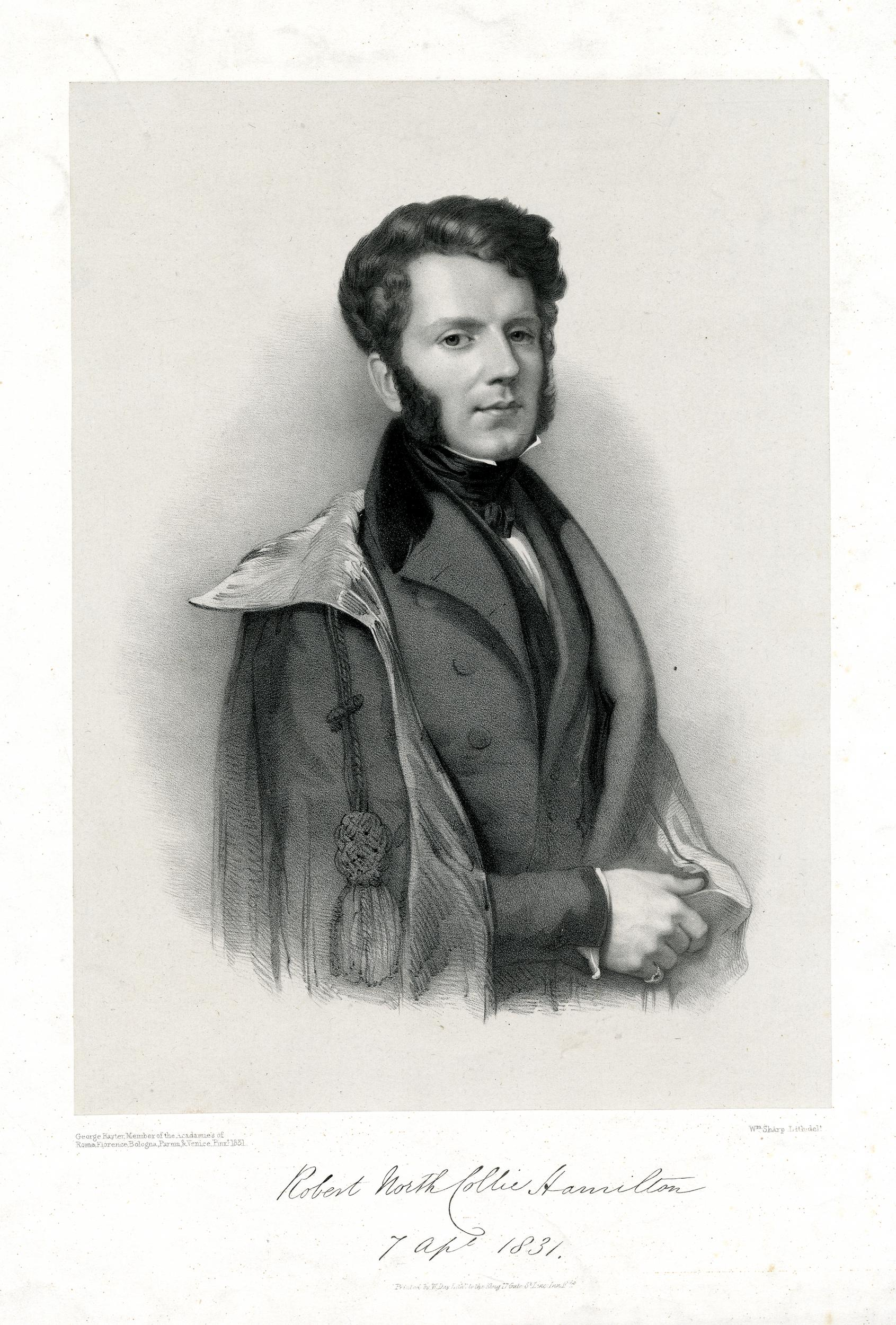
Sir Robert Hamilton, 6th Baronet

Sir Robert North Collie Hamilton, 6th Baronet KCB DL (7 April 1802 – 31 May 1887) was a British politician and East India Company civil servant.

Hamilton was the eldest son of Sir Frederic Hamilton, 5th Baronet, and his wife, Eliza Ducarel Collie. He succeeded to the Baronetcy in 1853.

== Career ==
He entered the East India Company civil service in 1820, and served in Benares until 1830. He was appointed Magistrate and Collector of Meerut in 1834 and served in this post for three years before moving to be Commissioner of the Agra Division from 1837 to 1841, including during the famine.

His next post was as secretary to the Lieutenant Governor of the North-West Provinces from 1841 to 1852, before he became Agent to the Governor-General in Central India (1852–60). He was appointed a member of the Governor-General's Council in 1859 and Knight Commander of the KCB in 1860, before retiring from the East India Company in the latter year.

On his return to England, he was a Deputy Lieutenant and Magistrate for Warwickshire and was appointed High Sheriff of Warwickshire for 1866. He lived at Avon Cliffe in Stratford-upon-Avon, Warwickshire.

He contested the Parliamentary Constituency of South Warwickshire as a Liberal candidate in the 1868 and 1874 general elections.

== Marriage and issue ==
In 1831, he married Constance, daughter of General Sir George Anson. She died in 1842, having had two sons and three daughters:

- Constance Eliza Ann Hamilton (1832–1919), married Maj.-Gen. Alexander Ross Eliot Hutchinson
- Sir Frederick Hamilton, 7th Baronet (1836–1919), army officer
- Frances "Fanny" Isabella Hamilton (1835–1906), married Capt. William Ross Shakespear
- Louisa Catherine Emma Hamilton (1843–1938), married Charles Raymond Pelly
- Francis Henry Hamilton (1840–1891), army officer

He was succeeded by his eldest son, Frederick, in 1887.

Baronetage of Nova Scotia
| Preceded by Frederic Hamilton | Baronet (of Silvertonhill); 1853–1887 | Succeeded by Frederic Harding Anson Hamilton |
