= William Craven, 5th Baron Craven =

English nobleman and Member of Parliament

William Craven, 5th Baron Craven (19 September 1705 – 17 March 1769) was an English nobleman and Member of Parliament.

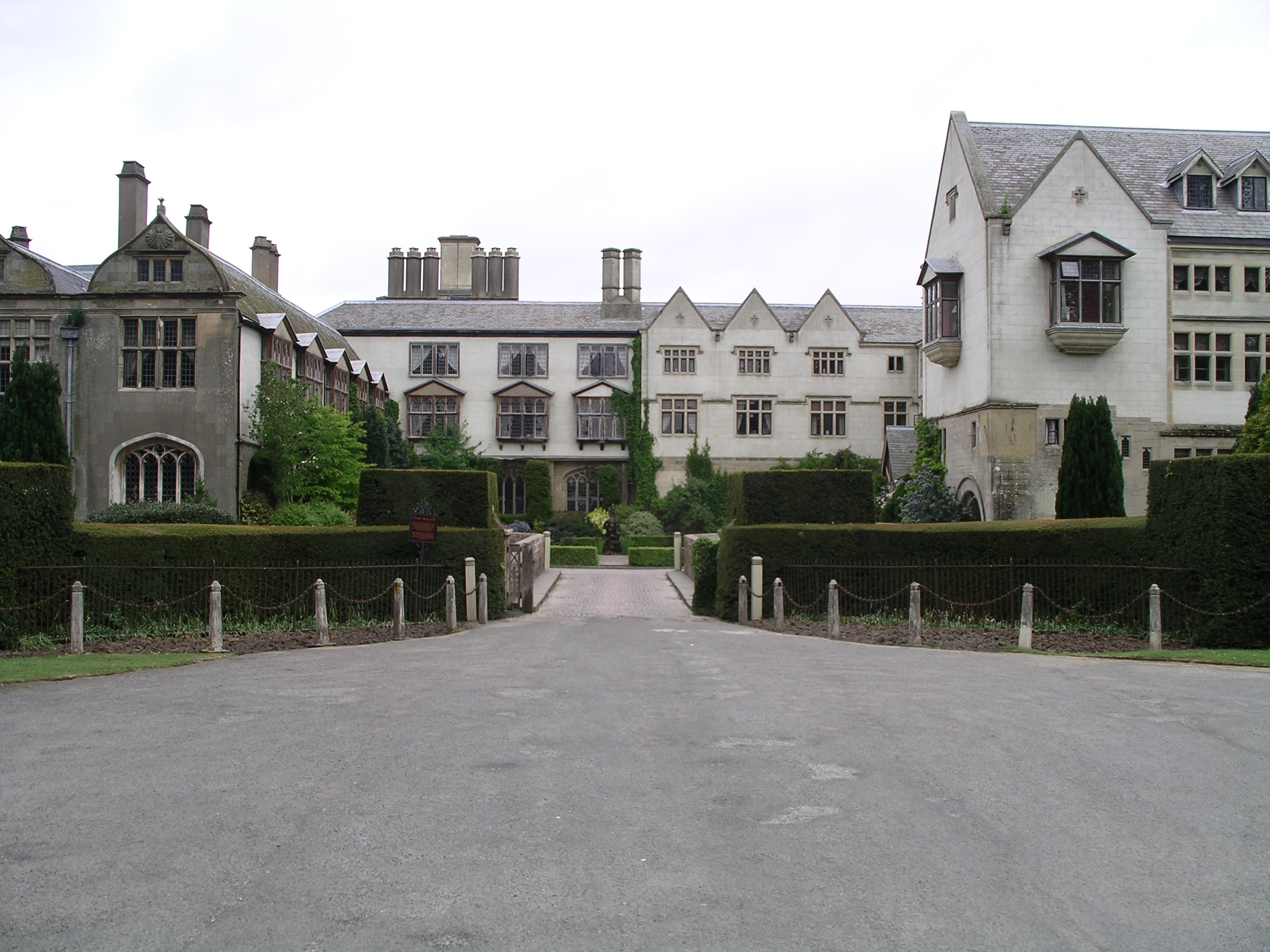
Coombe Abbey, Warwickshire

He was born the son of John Craven of Whitley, Coventry in Warwickshire and educated at Emmanuel College, Cambridge.

He was the Member of Parliament for Warwickshire from 24 December 1746 to 10 November 1764.

In 1749 he married Jane, the daughter of the Rev. Rowland Berkeley of Cotheridge, Worcestershire but had no children. He succeeded his cousin, Fulwar Craven, as Baron Craven in 1764, inheriting and residing at Coombe Abbey in Warwickshire.

He was succeeded in turn by his nephew William Craven, 6th Baron Craven, the son of his brother John.

Parliament of Great Britain
| Preceded by Edward Digby; Sir Charles Mordaunt | Member of Parliament for Warwickshire; 1746–1764; With: Sir Charles Mordaunt | Succeeded by Sir Charles Mordaunt; William Throckmorton Bromley |
Peerage of England
| Preceded by Fulwar Craven | Baron Craven; 1764–1769 | Succeeded by William Craven |
