= Samuel Strang Steel =

British politician

Sir Samuel Strang Steel

Member of Parliament for Ashford
- In office 1918–1929
- Preceded by: Laurence Hardy
- Succeeded by: Roderick Kedward

Personal details
- Born: 1 August 1882
- Died: 14 August 1961 (aged 79)
- Party: Conservative
- Spouse: Vere Mabel Cornwallis (m. 1910)
- Children: Fiennes Steel; Jock Steel; James Steel; Grizel Steel; Robert Steel
- Parents: William Steel (father); Rosetta Barber (mother)
- Education: Eton College
- Alma mater: Trinity College, Cambridge

Military service
- Allegiance: United Kingdom
- Branch/service: British Army
- Rank: Major
- Unit: Duke of York's Own Loyal Suffolk Hussars; Lothians and Border Horse; Royal Company of Archers

Sir Samuel Barber Strang Steel of Philiphaugh, 1st Baronet, Territorial Decoration (1 August 1882 – 14 August 1961) was a landowner and Conservative Party politician in the United Kingdom. He was Member of Parliament (MP) for Ashford from 1918 to 1929.

== Early life ==
Samuel Strang Steel was the only son of William Steel, who founded Steel Brothers & Co with his older brother James in Burma and his wife Rosetta Barber (married 25 October 1881). William and Rosetta Steel were divorced in Scotland in 1888.

== Education ==
Samuel Strang Steel was educated at Cargilfield Preparatory School, Edinburgh and Eton College, before going on to Trinity College, Cambridge, in 1900 and graduating BA (1903) and MA (1908). He was admitted to Middle Temple in 1902 and was called to the bar in 1905, but appears not to have practised as a barrister.

== Family life ==
On 3 August 1910 he married the Hon. Vere Mabel Cornwallis (died 1964), daughter of Fiennes Stanley Wykeham Cornwallis, 1st Baron Cornwallis and his wife Mabel Leigh. They had five children:

- Fiennes William Strang Steel, 2nd Baronet.
- Jock Wykeham Strang Steel (1914-1991), married Lesley Graham, daughter of Sir John Reginald Graham of Larbert Bt, VC.
- James Malcolm Strang Steel, Lieutenant Grenadier Guards,(1919-1943) killed in action WW2.
- Grizel Mabel Strang Steel (1921-2000).
- Robert Stanley Strang Steel (1934-2011).

== Career ==
In 1910, Samuel Strang Steel stood, unsuccessfully, as the Liberal Unionist candidate for Peebles and Selkirk in the two general elections that year. Samuel Strang Steel succeeded his father, William Strang Steel, at Philiphaugh in 1911. He was first commissioned into the Duke of York's Own Loyal Suffolk Hussars on 20 March 1901. During the 1st World War he served, as a Major, with the Lothians and Border Horse on the Macedonian front.

After the war he was elected at the 1918 general election as the MP for Ashford Kent, holding the seat until the 1929 election, when he lost the seat to the Rev. Roderick Kedward, the Liberal Party candidate. He was Permanent Private Secretary to the Minister for Agriculture (Sir Robert Sanders) (1923–24) and to the Financial Secretary to the Treasury (Walter Guinness) (1925). He was President of the Scottish Unionist Association (1937–38 and 1942–3). He was created a Baronet for "political and public services in Scotland" on 2 July 1938.

Samuel Strang Steel was a Director of the London and North Eastern Railway, which named a LNER Class B1 No 61244 locomotive 'Strang Steel', and of the Bank of Scotland. He served with distinction as a Forestry Commissioner (1932-1949). He built up the Scottish Co-operative Forestry Society Ltd which merged with the Scottish Woodland Owners' Association. During the war he was appointed Deputy Controller of the Home Grown Timber Production Department responsible for its activities in Scotland.

He was a County Councillor for Selkirkshire and Convenor (1946). He was Lord Lieutenant of Selkirkshire from 1948 to 1956. He was a member of The Queen's Bodyguard for Scotland, Royal Company of Archers, promoted to Ensign (1953).

== Succession ==
Sir Samuel died on 14 August 1961. He was succeeded by his eldest son Sir (Fiennes) William Strang Steel (1912-1992) as 2nd Baronet. Sir William was educated at Eton College and Royal Military Academy Sandhurst and served in the 17th/21st Lancers during WW2. He was a Forestry Commissioner (1958-1967) and a member of Selkirk County Council (convenor 1967). He married, on 7 August 1941, Joan only daughter of Brigadier-General Sir Brodie Henderson KCMG, CB, who died 1992.

== General references ==
- Craig, F. W. S. (1983) [1969]. British parliamentary election results 1918-1949 (3rd ed.). Chichester: Parliamentary Research Services. ISBN 0-900178-06-X.
- ThePeerage.com
- Leigh Rayment's list of baronets
- Leigh Rayment's Historical List of MPs

Parliament of the United Kingdom
Preceded by Laurence Hardy	Member of Parliament for Ashford; 1918–1929	Succeeded by Roderick Kedward
Honorary titles
Preceded by Charles Plummer	Lord Lieutenant of Selkirkshire; 1948–1958	Succeeded by Sir Conolly Abel Smith
Baronetage of the United Kingdom
New creation	Baronet of Philiphaugh; 1938–1961	Succeeded by Fiennes Steel
