= George Shuckburgh-Evelyn =

British politician (1751–1804)

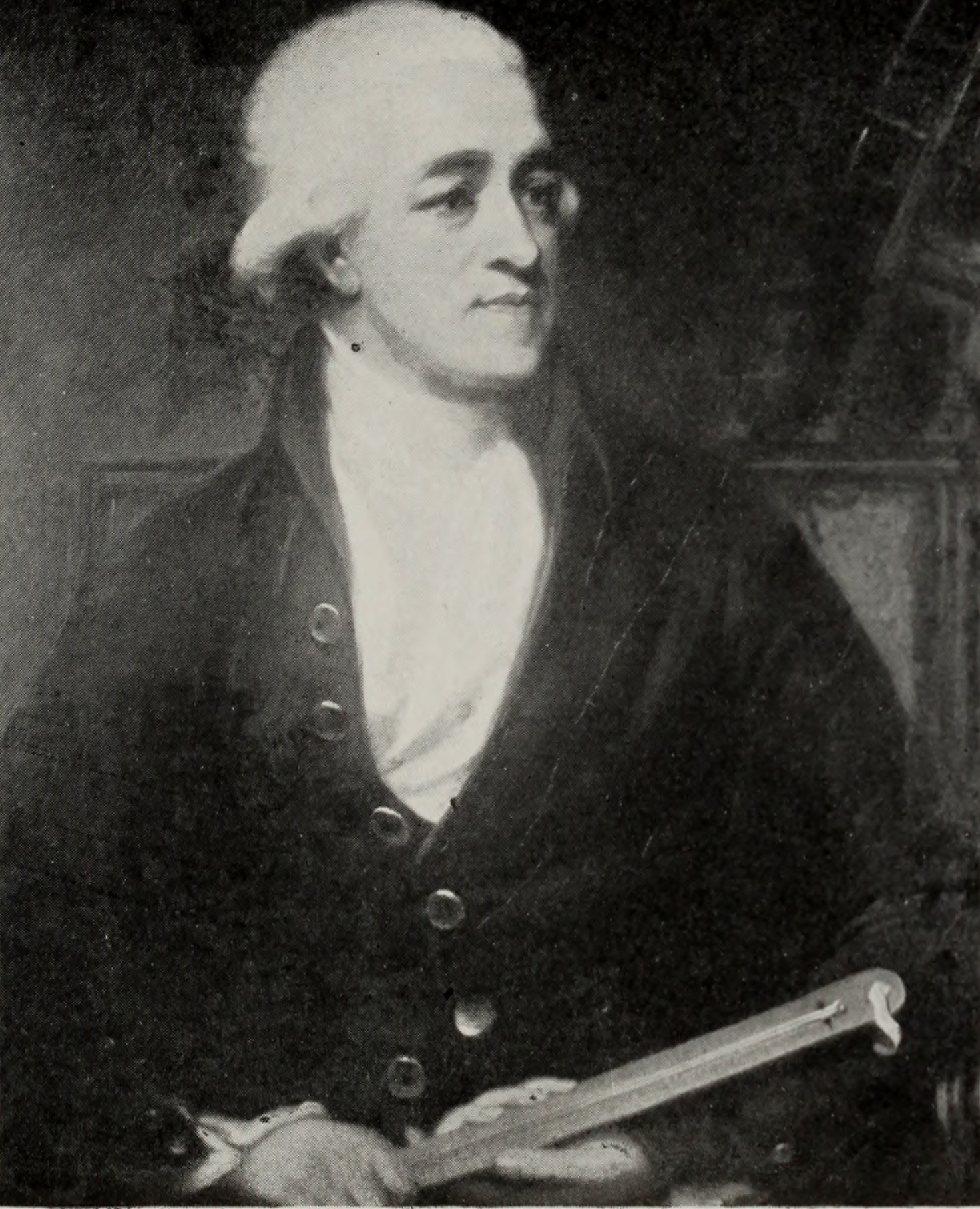
Sir George A. W. Shuckburgh-Evelyn, 6th Bart, copy of a portrait by John Hoppner

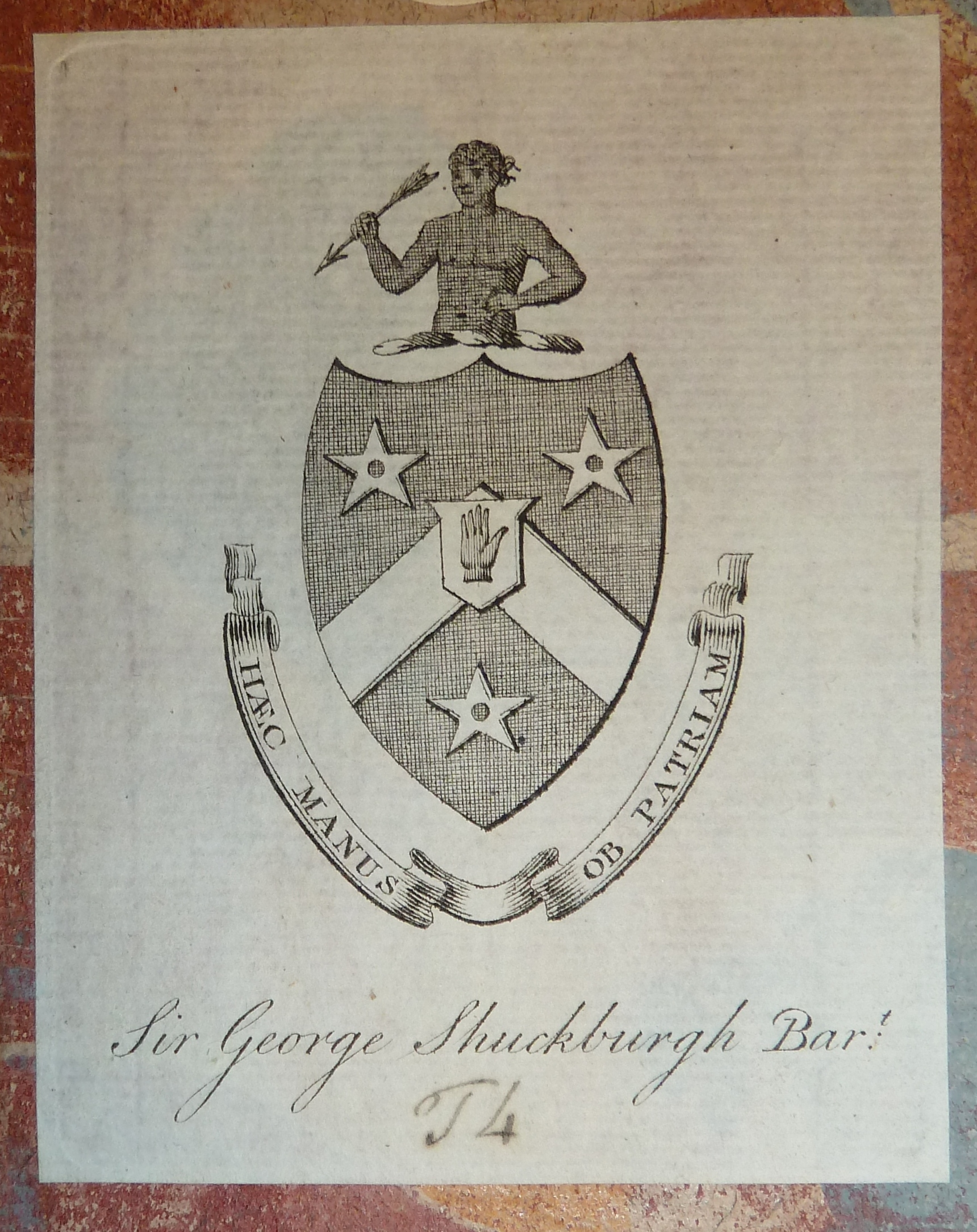
Armorial bookplate of Sir George Shuckburgh, Bart

Sir George Augustus William Shuckburgh-Evelyn, 6th Baronet (23 August 1751 – 11 August 1804) was a British politician, mathematician and astronomer.

== Life ==
George Shuckburgh was born on 23 August 1751, the son of Richard Shuckburgh of Limerick. He was educated at Rugby School and Balliol College, Oxford, from which he earned a bachelor's degree in 1772.

He became a baronet in 1773, on the death of his uncle, and (after returning from his postgraduate travels to Europe) moved to Shuckburgh Hall, the family estate in Shuckburgh, Warwickshire.

In 1774, Shuckburgh was elected a Fellow of the Royal Society.

He served in the House of Commons as a Member of Parliament for Warwickshire from 1780 until his death in 1804.

Shuckburgh's Name Act 1794
- Act of Parliament
- Parliament of Great Britain
- Long title: An act to enable Sir George Augustus William Shuckburgh, Baronet, to take, use, and bear, the Surname and Arms of Evelyn.
- Citation: 34 Geo. 3. c. 45 Pr.
- Territorial extent: Great Britain

Dates
- Royal assent: 17 April 1794
- Commencement: 21 January 1794 (Note: Start of session.)

Status: Current legislation

In 1782, he was married to Sarah Johanna Darker, daughter of John Darker. His second marriage on 6 October 1785 was to Julia Annabella Evelyn, the daughter of James Evelyn of Felbridge; when his father-in-law died in 1793, Shuckburgh added Evelyn to his own surname by a private act of Parliament, Shuckburgh's Name Act 1794 (34 Geo. 3. c. 45 Pr.). Their daughter, Julia Evelyn Medley Shuckburgh, married Charles Jenkinson, 3rd Earl of Liverpool.

Shuckburgh died on 11 August 1804 in Lower Shuckburgh, Warwickshire.

== Scientific contributions ==
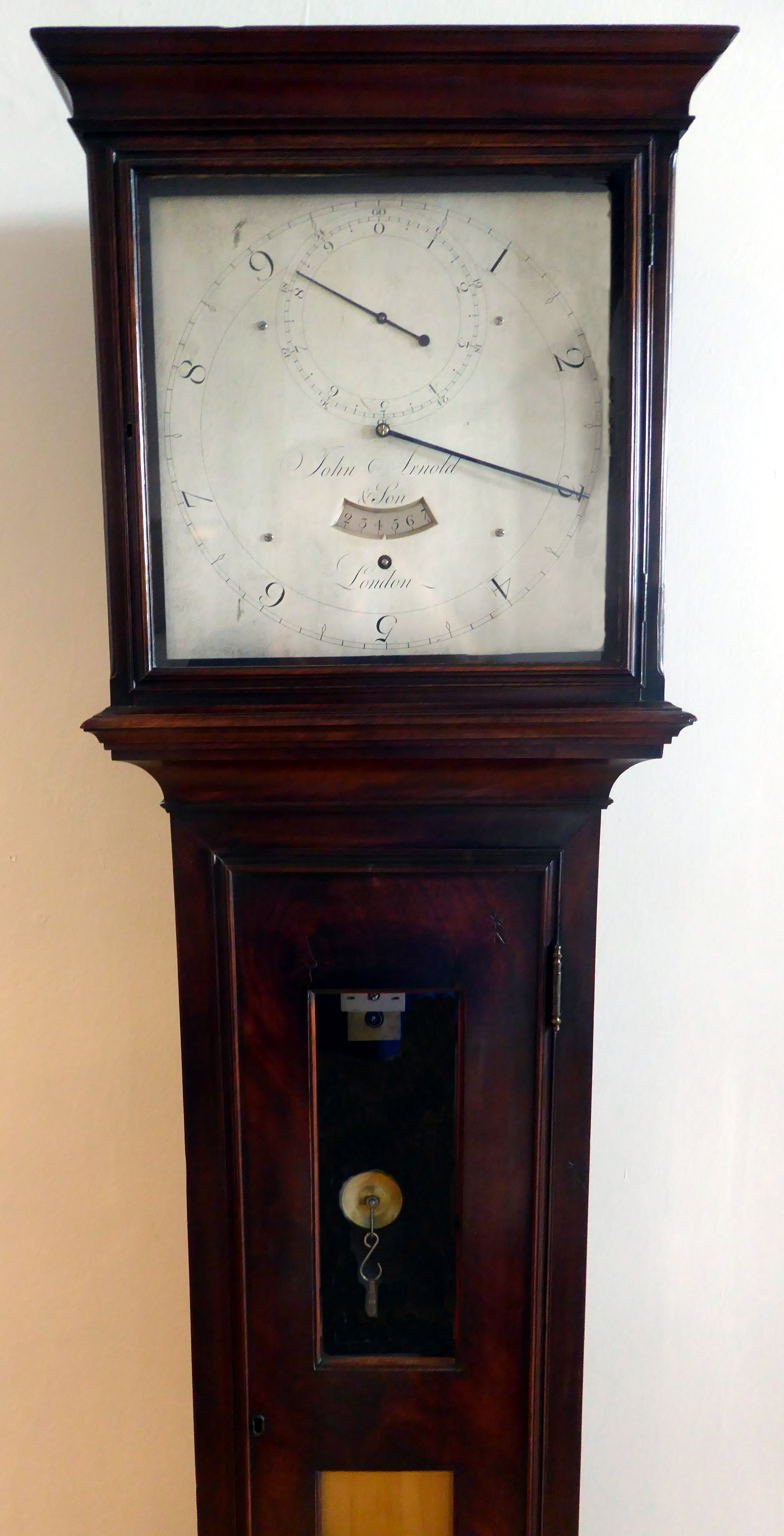
Sidereal clock acquired by George Shuckburgh

He made a series of astronomical observations and an ephemeris, which he published in twelve volumes between 1774 and 1797. In 1791 the Shuckburgh telescope was installed at his private observatory in Warwickshire, England. Included among his observations were measurements of lunar surface features. The crater Shuckburgh on the Moon is named after him.

Shuckburgh also contributed to metrology. He performed a series of observations on the change in the boiling point of water at different pressures, and pointed out the need for controlling for this effect when calibrating thermometers. The Shuckburgh scale was a standard brass yard constructed for him by Edward Troughton, whose company later made the Victorian standard yard of 1855; the Shuckburgh scale was used by George Biddell Airy in his measurements of the earth's shape, and in setting standards for many years by the British government.

In statistics, Shuckburgh was a pioneer in the collation of price indexes.

He became a Fellow of the Royal Society in 1774. In 1798, he was co-winner of the Copley Medal, the highest award of the Society.

== Notes ==
Parliament of Great Britain
Preceded by Sir Thomas Skipwith; Sir Charles Holte	Member of Parliament for Warwickshire; 1780–1801; With: Sir Robert Lawley 1780–93; Sir John Mordaunt 1793–1801	Succeeded by Parliament of the United Kingdom
Parliament of the United Kingdom
Preceded by Parliament of Great Britain	Member of Parliament for Warwickshire; 1801–1804; With: Sir John Mordaunt 1801–02; Dugdale Stratford Dugdale 1802–04	Succeeded by Dugdale Stratford Dugdale; Sir Charles Mordaunt
Baronetage of England
Preceded by Charles Shuckburgh	Baronet (of Shuckburgh); 1773–1804	Succeeded by Stewkley Shuckburgh
