= Sir John Mordaunt, 7th Baronet =

English politician

Sir John Mordaunt, 7th Baronet (baptised 9 May 1734 – 18 November 1806) was an English politician who represented the constituency of Warwickshire.

Mordaunt was born the son of Sir Charles Mordaunt, 6th Baronet and educated at New College, Oxford. He succeeded his father as 7th Baronet in 1778.

Mordaunt was a captain in the Warwickshire militia from 1759 to 1763 and a Groom of the Bedchamber from 1763 to 1793. He was elected unopposed as the MP for Warwickshire from 1793 to 1802.

Mordaunt died in 1806. He had married Elizabeth, the daughter and coheiress of Thomas Prowse of Compton Bishop, Somerset, with whom he had 2 sons and 6 daughters. Mordaunt was succeeded by his son Charles, who also became MP for Warwickshire in 1804.

Parliament of Great Britain
| Preceded by Sir George Shuckburgh; Sir Robert Lawley | Member of Parliament for Warwickshire; 1793–1801; With: Sir George Shuckburgh | Succeeded by Parliament of the United Kingdom |
Parliament of the United Kingdom
| Preceded by Parliament of Great Britain | Member of Parliament for Warwickshire; 1801–1802; With: Sir George Shuckburgh | Succeeded by Sir George Shuckburgh; Dugdale Stratford Dugdale |
Baronetage of England
| Preceded by Charles Mordaunt | Baronet (of Massingham Parva); 1778–1806 | Succeeded by Charles Mordaunt |
