= Ashford (constituency) =

Parliamentary constituency in the United Kingdom, 1885 onwards

Coordinates: 51.15°N 0.93°E

- County constituency for the House of Commons
- Boundaries since 2024
- Boundary of Ashford in South East England
- County: Kent
- Population: 112,940 (2011 census)
- Electorate: 73,546 (2023)
- Major settlements: Ashford, Hawkinge, Wye

Current constituency
- Created: 1885
- Member of Parliament: Sojan Joseph (Labour)
- Seats: One
- Created from: West Kent

Ashford is a constituency in Kent created in 1885 and represented in the House of Commons of the UK Parliament since 2024 by Sojan Joseph of the Labour Party.

== Constituency profile ==
The constituency is located in the county of Kent and stretches over parts of the Borough of Ashford and Folkestone and Hythe local government districts. The constituency contains the large market town of Ashford and the rural areas to its east, up to but not including the town of Folkestone. Other settlements in the constituency are the small town of Hawkinge and many smaller villages including Lyminge and Wye.

Ashford is an important railway hub and the town's population has grown sharply in recent decades. Residents of the constituency have average levels of wealth, education and ethnic diversity compared to the country as a whole. In the most recent local government elections in 2023, voters in Ashford elected primarily Labour councillors, whilst the rural areas of the constituency elected mostly Conservative and Green Party councillors. Voters in the Ashford constituency were in favour of leaving the European Union in the 2016 referendum, with an estimated 60% of voters supporting Brexit.

== Boundaries ==
Map of boundaries 2010–2024

1885–1918: The Municipal Borough of Tenterden, the Sessional Divisions of Ashford and Cranbrook, the corporate towns of Lydd and New Romney, and part of the Liberty of Romney Marsh.

1918–1950: The Municipal Boroughs of Lydd, New Romney, and Tenterden, the Urban District of Ashford, and the Rural Districts of Cranbrook, East Ashford, Romney Marsh, Tenterden, and West Ashford.

1950–1974: The Municipal Borough of Tenterden, the Urban District of Ashford, and the Rural Districts of Cranbrook, East Ashford, Tenterden, and West Ashford.

1974–1983: The Municipal Borough of Tenterden, the Urban District of Ashford, and the Rural Districts of East Ashford, Tenterden, and West Ashford. Cranbrook Rural District was transferred to the new Royal Tunbridge Wells constituency.

1983–2010: The Borough of Ashford. The constituency boundaries remained unchanged from 1974.

2010–2024: The Borough of Ashford wards of Aylesford Green, Beaver, Biddenden, Bockhanger, Boughton Aluph and Eastwell, Bybrook, Charing, Downs North, Downs West, Godinton, Great Chart with Singleton North, Highfield, Isle of Oxney, Kennington, Little Burton Farm, Norman, North Willesborough, Park Farm North, Park Farm South, Rolvenden and Tenterden West, St Michael's, Singleton South, South Willesborough, Stanhope, Stour, Tenterden North, Tenterden South, Victoria, Washford, Weald Central, Weald East, Weald North, Weald South, and Wye.

2024–present: Following the 2023 periodic review of Westminster constituencies which came into effect for 2024 general election, the constituency is composed of the following (as they existed on 1 December 2020):

- The Borough of Ashford wards of: Aylesford & East Stour; Beaver; Bircholt; Bockhanger; Bybrook; Conningbrook & Little Burton Farm; Furley; Goat Lees; Godinton; Highfield; Kennington; Mersham, Sevington South with Finberry; Norman; Park Farm North; Park Farm South; Repton; Roman; Singleton East; Singleton West; Stanhope; Victoria; Washford; Willesborough; Wye with Hinxhill.
- The District of Folkestone and Hythe wards of: North Downs East; North Downs West.

The bulk of the geographic area of the constituency, including the town of Tenterden, and comprising approximately 35% of the current electorate, was moved to the newly created constituency of Weald of Kent. To partly compensate, the two North Downs wards were transferred from Folkestone and Hythe.

== Political history ==
Created under the Redistribution of Seats Act 1885, Ashford has been won by a Conservative at every election until 2024, except that of 1929 when it was won by a Liberal, after that party's turn towards the left marked by the People's Budget in 1911, who won with a majority of less than 1% of the vote.

The most marginal victory since 1929 occurred in 1997 when its voters returned a Conservative who won by a 9.7% majority. The 2015 result made the seat the 106th safest of the Conservative Party's 331 seats by percentage of majority.

In June 2016, an estimated 60% of local adults voting in the EU membership referendum chose to leave the European Union instead of to remain. This was matched in two January 2018 votes in Parliament by its MP.

The Conservatives lost the seat at the 2024 general election to Sojan Joseph of the Labour Party, the first time in the seat's history that it was won by Labour.

== Members of Parliament ==
West Kent prior to 1885

Election	Member	Party
1885	William Pomfret	Conservative
1892	Laurence Hardy	Conservative
1918	Samuel Strang Steel	Coalition Conservative
1929	Rev Roderick Kedward	Liberal
1931	Michael Knatchbull	Conservative
1933 by-election	Patrick Spens	Conservative
1943 by-election	Edward Percy Smith	Conservative
1950	Bill Deedes	Conservative
October 1974	Keith Speed	Conservative
1997	Damian Green	Conservative
2024	Sojan Joseph	Labour

== Elections ==
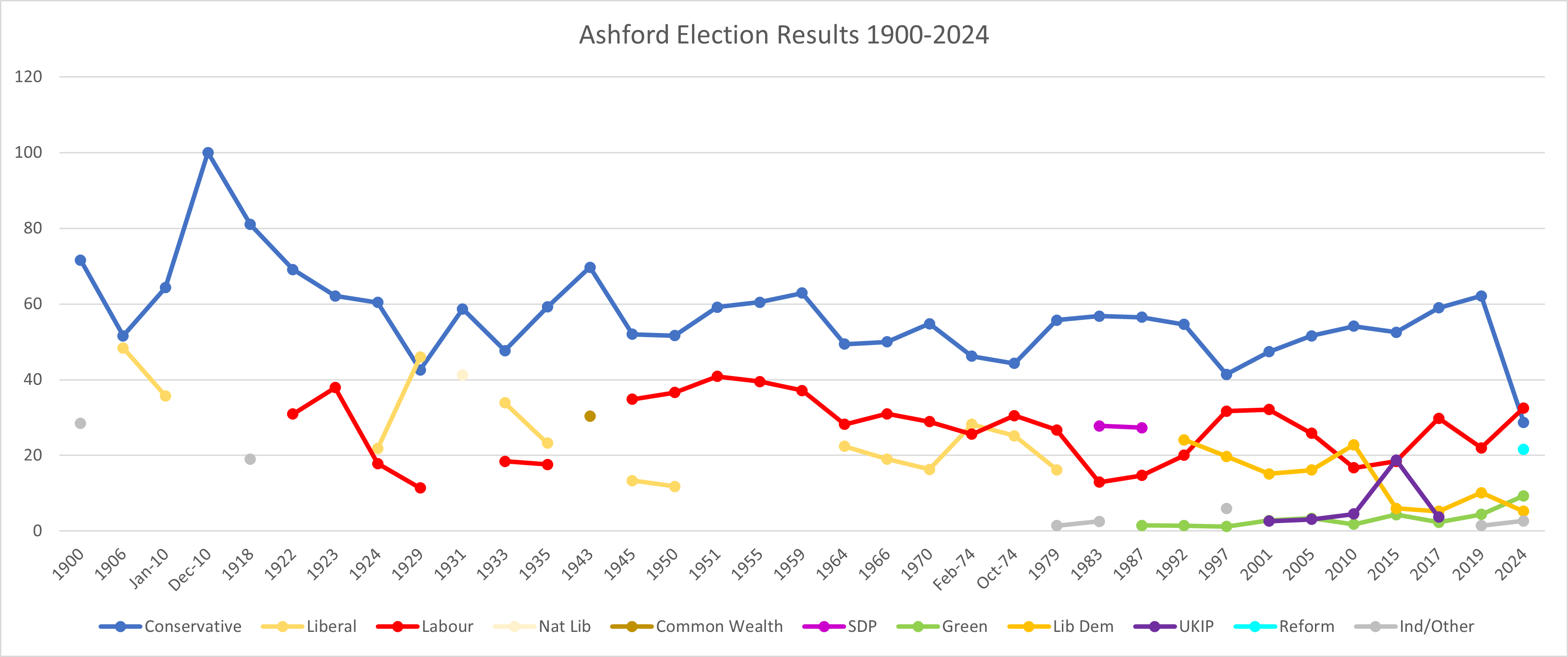
Ashford Election Results 1900-2024

=== Elections in the 2020s ===
2024 general election: Ashford
Party	Candidate	Votes	%	±%
Labour	Sojan Joseph	15,262	32.5	▲8.7
Conservative	Damian Green	13,483	28.7	▼30.5
Reform	Tristram Kennedy Harper	10,141	21.6	new
Green	Mandy Rossi	4,355	9.3	▲4.7
Liberal Democrats	Adam Rowledge	2,445	5.2	▼5.5
Consensus	James Ransley	1,289	2.7	new
Majority		1,779	3.8	
Turnout		46,975	61.6	▼4.5
Registered electors		76,212		
Labour gain from Conservative		Swing	▲19.6	

=== Elections in the 2010s ===
2019 notional result
Party	Vote	%
Conservative	28,759	59.2
Labour	11,548	23.8
Liberal Democrats	5,176	10.7
Green	2,234	4.6
Others	862	1.8
Turnout	48,579	66.1
Electorate	73,546	

2019 general election: Ashford
Party	Candidate	Votes	%	±%
Conservative	Damian Green	37,270	62.1	+3.1
Labour	Dara Farrell	13,241	22.0	−7.8
Liberal Democrats	Adrian Gee-Turner	6,048	10.1	+4.9
Green	Mandy Rossi	2,638	4.4	+2.1
Independent	Susannah De Sanvil	862	1.4	N/A
Majority		24,029	40.1	+10.9
Turnout		60,059	67.1	−1.4
Registered electors		89,553		
Conservative hold		Swing	+5.4	

2017 general election: Ashford
Party	Candidate	Votes	%	±%
Conservative	Damian Green	35,318	59.0	+6.5
Labour	Sally Gathern	17,840	29.8	+11.4
Liberal Democrats	Adrian Gee-Turner	3,101	5.2	−0.8
UKIP	Gerald O'Brien	2,218	3.7	−15.1
Green	Mandy Rossi	1,402	2.3	−2.0
Majority		17,478	29.2	−4.5
Turnout		59,879	68.5	+1.2
Registered electors		87,387		
Conservative hold		Swing	−2.5	

2015 general election: Ashford
Party	Candidate	Votes	%	±%
Conservative	Damian Green	30,094	52.5	−1.6
UKIP	Gerald O'Brien	10,798	18.8	+14.3
Labour	Brendan Chilton	10,580	18.4	+1.7
Liberal Democrats	Debbie Enever	3,433	6.0	−16.8
Green	Mandy Rossi	2,467	4.3	+2.5
Majority		19,296	33.7	+2.4
Turnout		57,372	67.3	−0.6
Registered electors		85,177		
Conservative hold		Swing	−8.0	

2010 general election: Ashford
Party	Candidate	Votes	%	±%
Conservative	Damian Green	29,878	54.1	+2.7
Liberal Democrats	Chris Took	12,581	22.8	+7.2
Labour	Chris Clark	9,204	16.7	−9.7
UKIP	Jeffrey Elenor	2,508	4.5	+1.4
Green	Steven Campkin	1,014	1.8	−1.6
Majority		17,297	31.3	+5.6
Turnout		55,185	67.9	+2.5
Registered electors		81,271		
Conservative hold		Swing	+2.3	

=== Elections in the 2000s ===
2005 general election: Ashford
Party	Candidate	Votes	%	±%
Conservative	Damian Green	26,651	51.6	+4.2
Labour	Valerie Whitaker	13,353	25.8	−6.3
Liberal Democrats	Chris Took	8,308	16.1	+1.0
Green	Richard Boden	1,753	3.4	+0.6
UKIP	Bernard Stroud	1,620	3.1	+0.5
Majority		13,298	25.8	+10.5
Turnout		51,685	65.0	+2.5
Registered electors		78,816		
Conservative hold		Swing	+5.2	

2001 general election: Ashford
Party	Candidate	Votes	%	±%
Conservative	Damian Green	22,739	47.4	+6.0
Labour	John Adams	15,380	32.1	+0.4
Liberal Democrats	Keith Fitchett	7,236	15.1	−4.6
Green	Richard Boden	1,353	2.8	+1.6
UKIP	David Waller	1,229	2.6	N/A
Majority		7,359	15.3	+5.6
Turnout		47,937	62.5	−11.7
Registered electors		76,699		
Conservative hold		Swing	+3.2	

=== Elections in the 1990s ===
1997 general election: Ashford
Party	Candidate	Votes	%	±%
Conservative	Damian Green	22,899	41.4	−13.2
Labour	John Ennals	17,554	31.7	+11.7
Liberal Democrats	John Williams	10,901	19.7	−4.4
Referendum	Christopher Cruden	3,201	5.8	N/A
Green	Richard Boden	660	1.2	−0.2
Natural Law	Stephen Tyrell	89	0.2	N/A
Majority		5,345	9.7	−20.8
Turnout		55,294	74.2	−5.0
Registered electors		74,512		
Conservative hold		Swing	−12.5	

1992 general election: Ashford
Party	Candidate	Votes	%	±%
Conservative	Keith Speed	31,031	54.6	−1.9
Liberal Democrats	Christine Headley	13,672	24.1	−3.2
Labour	Doreen Cameron	11,365	20.0	+5.3
Green	Charles Porter	773	1.4	−0.1
Majority		17,359	30.5	+1.3
Turnout		56,841	79.2	+3.5
Registered electors		71,767		
Conservative hold		Swing	+0.7	

=== Elections in the 1980s ===
1987 general election: Ashford
Party	Candidate	Votes	%	±%
Conservative	Keith Speed	29,978	56.5	−0.3
SDP	Neil Macmillan	14,490	27.3	−0.5
Labour	Michael Wiggins	7,775	14.7	+1.8
Green	Charles Porter	778	1.5	+0.3
Majority		15,488	29.2	+0.2
Turnout		53,021	75.7	+2.5
Registered electors		70,052		
Conservative hold		Swing		

1983 general election: Ashford
Party	Candidate	Votes	%	±%
Conservative	Keith Speed	27,230	56.8	+1.1
SDP	Jo Hawkes	13,319	27.8	+11.6
Labour	Paul Lewis	6,167	12.9	−13.8
Ecology	Charles Porter	569	1.2	N/A
National Labour	J.W. King	456	0.9	N/A
BNP	R.E. Lockwood	195	0.4	N/A
Majority		13,911	29.0	0.0
Turnout		47,936	73.2	−3.5
Registered electors		65,442		
Conservative hold		Swing		

=== Elections in the 1970s ===
1979 general election: Ashford
Party	Candidate	Votes	%	±%
Conservative	Keith Speed	26,224	55.7	+11.4
Labour	A.A. Gilbert	12,586	26.7	−3.8
Liberal	Alison Wainman	7,631	16.2	−9.0
National Front	K.R. McKilliam	678	1.4	N/A
Majority		13,638	29.0	+15.2
Turnout		47,119	76.7	+2.2
Registered electors		61,460		
Conservative hold		Swing		

October 1974 general election: Ashford
Party	Candidate	Votes	%	±%
Conservative	Keith Speed	19,294	44.3	−1.9
Labour	M.B. Jackson	13,269	30.5	+4.9
Liberal	Clive G. Dennis	10,983	25.2	−3.0
Majority		6,025	13.8	−4.2
Turnout		43,546	74.5	−7.0
Registered electors		58,419		
Conservative hold		Swing		

February 1974 general election: Ashford
Party	Candidate	Votes	%	±%
Conservative	Bill Deedes	21,773	46.2	−6.4
Liberal	Clive G. Dennis	13,314	28.2	+11.9
Labour	M.B. Jackson	12,077	25.6	−5.4
Majority		8,459	18.0	−8.0
Turnout		47,164	81.5	+9.0
Registered electors		57,875		
Conservative hold		Swing		

1970 general election: Ashford
Party	Candidate	Votes	%	±%
Conservative	Bill Deedes	26,649	54.8	+4.8
Labour	John M. Bowyer	14,037	28.9	−2.1
Liberal	Frederick Charles Truman	7,902	16.3	−2.7
Majority		12,612	26.0	+7.0
Turnout		48,588	72.5	−2.9
Registered electors		66,975		
Conservative hold		Swing	+3.5	

=== Elections in the 1960s ===
1966 general election: Ashford
Party	Candidate	Votes	%	±%
Conservative	Bill Deedes	21,362	50.0	+0.6
Labour	Charles A. Thomas	13,249	31.0	+2.8
Liberal	J. Gavin W. Peck	8,121	19.0	−3.4
Majority		8,113	19.0	−2.2
Turnout		42,732	75.4	−2.1
Registered electors		56,669		
Conservative hold		Swing		

1964 general election: Ashford
Party	Candidate	Votes	%	±%
Conservative	Bill Deedes	21,026	49.4	−13.5
Labour	Charles A. Thomas	11,989	28.2	−8.9
Liberal	J. Gavin W. Peck	9,531	22.4	N/A
Majority		9,037	21.2	−4.6
Turnout		42,546	77.5	0.0
Registered electors		54,879		
Conservative hold		Swing		

=== Elections in the 1950s ===
1959 general election: Ashford
Party	Candidate	Votes	%	±%
Conservative	Bill Deedes	25,383	62.9	+2.4
Labour	Reginald Ward	14,983	37.1	−2.4
Majority		10,400	25.8	+4.9
Turnout		40,366	77.5	−0.6
Registered electors		52,097		
Conservative hold		Swing		

1955 general election: Ashford
Party	Candidate	Votes	%	±%
Conservative	Bill Deedes	23,992	60.5	+1.4
Labour	Neville Sandelson	15,685	39.5	−1.4
Majority		8,307	20.9	+2.6
Turnout		39,677	78.1	−3.8
Registered electors		50,821		
Conservative hold		Swing		

1951 general election: Ashford
Party	Candidate	Votes	%	±%
Conservative	Bill Deedes	24,093	59.1	+7.5
Labour	Neville Sandelson	16,645	40.9	+4.3
Majority		7,448	18.3	+3.3
Turnout		40,738	81.9	−2.2
Registered electors		49,715		
Conservative hold		Swing		

1950 general election: Ashford
Party	Candidate	Votes	%	±%
Conservative	Bill Deedes	21,095	51.6	−0.4
Labour	Neville Sandelson	14,948	36.6	+1.8
Liberal	H. Shirley	4,828	11.8	−1,5
Majority		6,147	15.0	−2.2
Turnout		40,871	84.1	+12.8
Registered electors		48,607		
Conservative hold		Swing		

=== Elections in the 1940s ===
1945 general election: Ashford
Party	Candidate	Votes	%	±%
Conservative	Edward Percy Smith	18,800	52.0	−7.2
Labour	Horace Waterton Lee	12,575	34.8	+17.2
Liberal	Harold Vezey Strong	4,804	13.3	−9.9
Majority		6,225	17.2	−18.8
Turnout		36,179	71.3	−2.3
Registered electors		50,760		
Conservative hold		Swing		

1943 Ashford by-election
Party	Candidate	Votes	%	±%
Conservative	Edward Percy Smith	9,648	69.7	+10.5
Common Wealth	Catherine E. Williamson	4,192	30.3	N/A
Majority		5,456	39.4	+3.4
Turnout		13,840	27.7	−45.9
Conservative hold		Swing		

=== Elections in the 1930s ===
14 November 1935 general election: Ashford
Party	Candidate	Votes	%	±%
Conservative	Patrick Spens	21,323	59.2	+0.5
Liberal	Borlase Matthews	8,338	23.2	N/A
Labour	W.J. Beck	6,333	17.6	N/A
Majority		12,985	36.0	+18.6
Turnout		35,994	73.6	−2.3
Registered electors		48,914		
Conservative hold		Swing		

1933 Ashford by-election
Party	Candidate	Votes	%	±%
Conservative	Patrick Spens	16,051	47.7	−11.0
Liberal	Roderick Kedward	11,423	33.9	−7.4
Labour	W.J. Beck	6,178	18.4	N/A
Majority		4,628	13.8	−3.6
Turnout		33,652	70.9	−5.0
Conservative hold		Swing		

27 October 1931 general election: Ashford
Party	Candidate	Votes	%	±%
Conservative	Michael Knatchbull	20,891	58.7	+16.1
National Liberal	Roderick Kedward	14,681	41.3	−4.7
Majority		6,210	17.4	
Turnout		35,572	75.9	+0.6
Conservative gain from Liberal		Swing		

=== Elections in the 1920s ===
30 May 1929 general election: Ashford
Party	Candidate	Votes	%	±%
Liberal	Roderick Kedward	15,753	46.0	+24.2
Unionist	Samuel Strang Steel	14,579	42.6	−17.8
Labour	Mont Follick	3,885	11.4	−6.4
Majority		1,174	3.4	
Turnout		34,217	75.3	+4.9
Registered electors		45,445		
Liberal gain from Unionist		Swing	+21.0	

29 October 1924 general election: Ashford
Party	Candidate	Votes	%	±%
Unionist	Samuel Strang Steel	15,159	60.4	−1.7
Liberal	Leonard John Humphrey	5,487	21.8	N/A
Labour	Basil Noble	4,473	17.8	−20.1
Majority		9,672	38.6	+14.4
Turnout		25,119	70.4	+12.6
Registered electors		35,659		
Unionist hold		Swing	+9.2	

6 December 1923 general election: Ashford
Party	Candidate	Votes	%	±%
Unionist	Samuel Strang Steel	12,644	62.1	−7.0
Labour	Basil Noble	7,709	37.9	+7.0
Majority		4,935	24.2	−14.0
Turnout		20,353	57.8	−6.4
Registered electors		35,223		
Unionist hold		Swing	+7.0	

15 November 1922 general election: Ashford
Party	Candidate	Votes	%	±%
Unionist	Samuel Strang Steel	15,638	69.1	−11.9
Labour	Basil Noble	6,977	30.9	N/A
Majority		8,661	38.2	−23.8
Turnout		22,615	64.2	+25.0
Registered electors		35,240		
Unionist hold		Swing		

=== Elections in the 1910s ===
14 December 1918 general election: Ashford
Party		Candidate	Votes	%	±%
C	Unionist	Samuel Strang Steel	10,258	81.0	N/A
	Independent Democrat	William H. Deedes	2,408	19.0	N/A
Majority			7,850	62.0	N/A
Turnout			12,666	39.2	N/A
Registered electors			32,349		
	Unionist hold		Swing	N/A	
C indicates candidate endorsed by the coalition government.

General Election 1914–15: Another General Election was required to take place before the end of 1915. The political parties had been making preparations for an election to take place and by July 1914, the following candidates had been selected;

- Unionist: Lawrence Hardy
- Liberal: Arthur Frederick William Johnson

December 1910 general election: Ashford
Party	Candidate	Votes	%	±%
Conservative	Laurence Hardy	Unopposed		
Conservative hold				

January 1910 general election: Ashford
Party	Candidate	Votes	%	±%
Conservative	Laurence Hardy	7,966	64.3	+12.7
Liberal	Reginald John Farrer	4,422	35.7	−12.7
Majority		3,544	28.6	+25.4
Turnout		12,418	87.2	+3.5
Conservative hold		Swing		

=== Elections in the 1900s ===
1906 general election: Ashford
Party	Candidate	Votes	%	±%
Conservative	Laurence Hardy	5,994	51.6	−20.0
Liberal	Percy Harris	5,614	48.4	N/A
Majority		380	3.2	−40.0
Turnout		11,608	83.7	+18.9
Registered electors		13,864		
Conservative hold		Swing		

1900 general election: Ashford
Party	Candidate	Votes	%	±%
Conservative	Laurence Hardy	5,898	71.6	N/A
Independent Protestant	Benjamin Nicholson	2,343	28.4	N/A
Majority		3,555	43.2	N/A
Turnout		8,241	64.8	N/A
Registered electors		12,714		
Conservative hold		Swing	N/A	

=== Elections in the 1890s ===
1895 general election: Ashford
Party	Candidate	Votes	%	±%
Conservative	Laurence Hardy	Unopposed		
Conservative hold				

Hardy

1892 general election: Ashford
Party	Candidate	Votes	%	±%
Conservative	Laurence Hardy	5,512	56.3	N/A
Liberal	John U Bugler	4,281	43.7	N/A
Majority		1,231	12.6	N/A
Turnout		9,793	68.4	N/A
Registered electors		14,314		
Conservative hold		Swing	N/A	

=== Elections in the 1880s ===
1886 general election: Ashford
Party	Candidate	Votes	%	±%
Conservative	William Pomfret	Unopposed		
Conservative hold				

1885 general election: Ashford
Party	Candidate	Votes	%	±%
Conservative	William Pomfret	6,020	55.2	N/A
Liberal	George Crispe Whiteley	4,895	44.8	N/A
Majority		1,125	10.4	N/A
Turnout		10,915	81.5	N/A
Registered electors		13,389		
Conservative win (new seat)				

== See also ==
- List of parliamentary constituencies in Kent
- List of parliamentary constituencies in the South East England (region)

== Sources ==
- British Parliamentary Election Results 1885–1918, compiled and edited by F.W.S. Craig (Macmillan Press 1974)
- Iain Dale, ed. (2003). The Times House of Commons 1929, 1931, 1935. Politico's (reprint). ISBN 1-84275-033-X.
- The Times House of Commons 1945. 1945.
- The Times House of Commons 1950. 1950.
- The Times House of Commons 1955. 1955.
