= Hardy baronets =

Set index for Shelley baronets

There have been two baronetcies created for the surname Hardy, both in the Baronetage of the United Kingdom. Both are extinct.

- Hardy baronets, of the Navy (1806): see Sir Thomas Masterman Hardy, 1st Baronet (1769–1839)
- Hardy baronets of Dunstall Hall (1876)

== See also ==
- Earl of Cranbrook
