= Henry Christopher Wise (British Army officer) =

British soldier

- Born: 12 April 1829. Rome, Papal States (now Italy)
- Died: 21 December 1854 (aged 26); Ballarat, Victoria, Australia
- Relatives: Henry Christopher Wise (father)
- Military career
- Allegiance: United Kingdom
- Branch: British Army
- Service years: 1847–1854
- Rank: Captain
- Unit: 40th Regiment of Foot
- Conflicts: Eureka Rebellion (DOW): Battle of the Eureka Stockade

Captain Henry Christopher Wise (12 April 1829 – 21 December 1854) was the highest-ranking British soldier who died in the Eureka rebellion.

Wise was the son of Henry Christopher Wise, an English Conservative politician, and his first wife Harriett Skipwith. He was educated privately by the Reverend William Nead before progressing to Eton School. His military education began at the Royal Military College at Sandhurst, being commissioned Ensign in the 40th Regiment of Foot in 1847. He became Lieutenant in 1849 and was assigned as Adjutant. The regiment was sent from England to serve in Australia, and arrived in Victoria in 1852 onboard H.M.S. Vulcan. In the following year he was promoted to Captain.

Wise was sent to Ballarat in November 1854 to suppress the miners' opposition. He was shot in the leg during the Battle of the Eureka Stockade and died eighteen days later. According to some eyewitness accounts, he was shot by Edward Thonen.

A memorial plaque to Captain Wise was erected in All Saints' Church, Leek Wootton.

He was played by Nigel Lovell in the 1949 film Eureka Stockade.
