= Dunstall Hall =

Country house in Staffordshire, England

Coordinates: 52.7814°N 1.7189°W

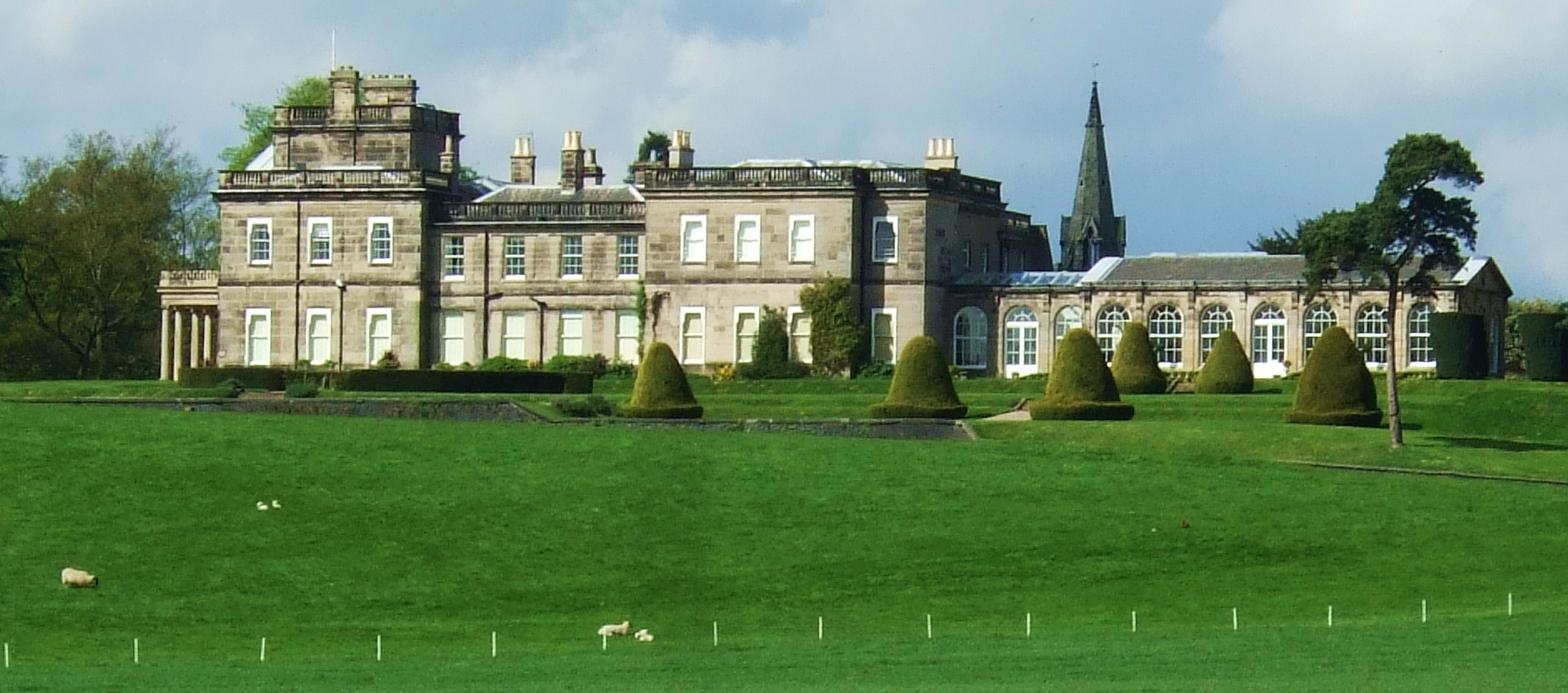
Dunstall Hall

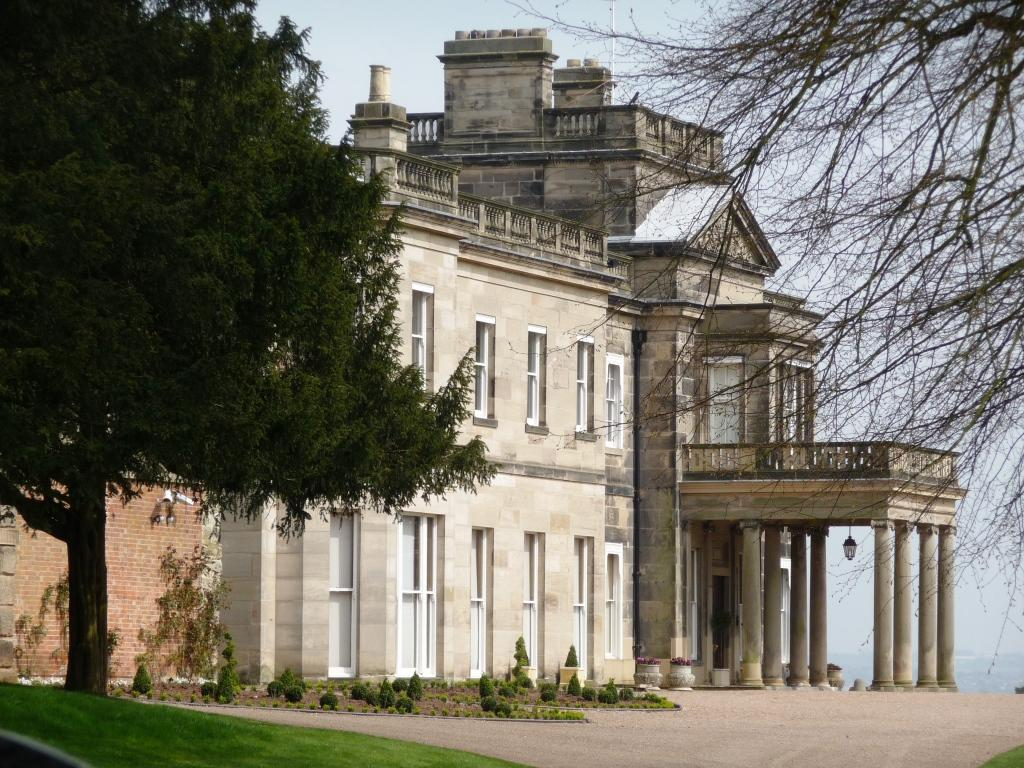
South front of Dunstall Hall

Dunstall Hall is a privately owned 18th century mansion house near Tatenhill, Burton upon Trent, Staffordshire. It is a Grade II* listed building.

== History ==
The manor is recorded as the property of the Earl of Derby in 1145 and the first house on the site of the hall was probably a hunting lodge in the Royal Forest of Needwood.

In 1814 the estate was bought by Richard Arkwright junior, (son of Sir Richard Arkwright) for his son Charles who lived there and who was High Sheriff of Staffordshire in 1849.

Charles died in 1850 childless and the estate was sold to John Hardy, later Sir John Hardy Bt. Hardy and later his son, Sir Reginald Hardy (High Sheriff 1893) carried out extensive alterations and improvements to the property. New building works included a new entrance front with a portico and new wings.

After the death of the 3rd Hardy Baronet in 1953 the estate was sold to wealthy Midlands civil engineer Sir Robert McCallum Douglas and on his death in 1997 it was sold to property developer and race course owner Sir Stanley Clarke.

In 2006, two years after the death of Sir Stanley Clarke, the estate was sold to bookmaker Barry Morgan, who sold Needwood Racing to Coral for several million pounds in 2005. In 2007, following renovation and refurbishment, Morgan opened the house for corporate and business events. In 2013 the house and 85 acres were for sale for £5 million. In July 2014 former Nottingham Forest Football Club's owner Fawaz Al-Hasawi bought the house for £4 Million.

== See also ==
- Grade II* listed buildings in East Staffordshire
- Listed buildings in Dunstall
