= Dugdale Stratford Dugdale =

British politician

Member of Parliament for Warwickshire
- In office 1802–1831
- Preceded by: Sir John Mordaunt
- Succeeded by: Richard Spooner

Personal details
- Born: Dugdale Stratford Dugdale; 1773 Warwickshire, England, United Kingdom
- Died: 5 November 1836 (aged 62–63) Warwickshire, England, United Kingdom
- Party: Independent
- Spouse: Charlotte Curzon
- Children: William Stratford Dugdale

Dugdale Stratford Dugdale (1773–1836) was a Member of Parliament for Warwickshire from 1802 to 1831.

== Early life ==
Dugdale Stratford Dugdale was the first surviving son of Richard Geast (later Dugdale), barrister, of Blythe Hall, by Penelope Bate Stratford, the daughter of Francis Stratford of Merevale Hall.

== Political career ==
Dugdale was returned unopposed for the constituency of Warwickshire in 1802, which he went on to serve for 29 years.

== Personal life ==
On 27 June 1799 he married Hon. Charlotte Curzon (d. 30 Dec. 1832), daughter of Assheton Curzon, 1st Viscount Curzon, with whom he had a son, the Conservative MP William Stratford Dugdale
