= Henry Christopher Wise (politician) =

English politician

Member of Parliament for South Warwickshire
- In office 1865–1874

Personal details
- Born: 7 October 1806
- Died: 15 January 1883 (aged 76)
- Party: Conservative
- Relatives: Henry Christopher Wise (son)
- Education: Oriel College, Oxford

Henry Christopher Wise (7 October 1806 – 15 January 1883) was an English Conservative politician who sat in the House of Commons from 1865 to 1874.

Wise was the son of Rev. Henry Wise of the Priory, Warwick and his wife Charlotte Mary Porten, daughter of Sir Stanier Porten. He was educated at Rugby School and at Oriel College, Oxford. He was deputy lieutenant and justice of the peace for Warwickshire and a major in the Warwickshire Yeomanry Cavalry.

At the 1865 general election Wise was elected as a member of parliament (MP) for South Warwickshire. He held the seat until 1874.

Wise died at the age of 76.

Wise married firstly in 1828, Harriett Skipwith, daughter of Sir Gray Skipwith, 8th Baronet. She died in 1858 and he married secondly Jane Harriet Disbrowe, daughter of Sir Edward Cromwell Disbrowe, G.C.G.

Parliament of the United Kingdom
Preceded by Evelyn Shirley; Sir Charles Mordaunt, Bt	Member of Parliament for South Warwickshire; 1865–1874; With: Sir Charles Mordaunt, Bt to 1868; John Hardy from 1868	Succeeded by Earl of Yarmouth; Sir John Eardley-Wilmot, Bt
