= South Warwickshire =

Parliamentary constituency in the United Kingdom, 1832–1885

- Former county constituency for the House of Commons
- County: Warwickshire

1832–1885
- Seats: Two
- Created from: Warwickshire
- Replaced by: Rugby; Stratford-on-Avon

South Warwickshire was a parliamentary constituency in the county of Warwickshire in England. It returned two Members of Parliament (MPs) to the House of Commons of the Parliament of the United Kingdom, elected by the first past the post system.

== History ==
The constituency was created under the Reform Act 1832, when the former Warwickshire constituency was divided into two new divisions: North Warwickshire and South Warwickshire.

South Warwickshire was itself abolished in 1885, when the Redistribution of Seats Act 1885 replaced it with four new single-member constituencies: Nuneaton, Rugby, Stratford-on-Avon and Tamworth.

== Boundaries ==
1832–1885: The Hundreds of Barlichway and Kington, and the Kenilworth and Southam Divisions of the Hundred of Knightlow.

== Members of Parliament ==
Election	1st Member	1st Party	2nd Member	2nd Party
1832	Sir Grey Skipwith, Bt	Whig	Sir George Philips, Bt	Whig
1835	Sir John Mordaunt, Bt	Conservative	Edward Sheldon	Radical
1836 by-election	Sir John Mordaunt, Bt	Conservative	Evelyn Shirley	Conservative
1845 by-election	Lord Brooke	Conservative	Evelyn Shirley	Conservative
1849 by-election	Lord Brooke	Conservative	Lord Guernsey	Conservative
1853 by-election	Evelyn Shirley	Conservative	Lord Guernsey	Conservative
1857	Evelyn Shirley	Conservative	Edward Bolton King	Whig
1859	Evelyn Shirley	Conservative	Sir Charles Mordaunt, Bt	Conservative
1865	Henry Christopher Wise	Conservative	Sir Charles Mordaunt, Bt	Conservative
1868	Henry Christopher Wise	Conservative	John Hardy	Conservative
1874	Hugh Seymour	Conservative	Sir John Eardley-Wilmot, Bt	Conservative
1880	Hon. Gilbert Leigh	Liberal	Sir John Eardley-Wilmot, Bt	Conservative
1884 by-election	Sampson Lloyd	Conservative	Sir John Eardley-Wilmot, Bt	Conservative
constituency abolished

== Election results ==
=== Elections in the 1830s ===
General election 1832: South Warwickshire
Party	Candidate	Votes	%
Whig	Grey Skipwith	1,396	38.5
Whig	George Philips	1,121	30.9
Tory	Evelyn Shirley	1,108	30.6
Majority		13	0.3
Turnout		2,249	88.2
Registered electors		2,550	
Whig win (new seat)			
Whig win (new seat)			

General election 1835: South Warwickshire
Party	Candidate	Votes	%
Radical	Edward Sheldon (MP)	Unopposed	
Conservative	John Mordaunt	Unopposed	
Registered electors		2,901	
Radical gain from Whig			
Conservative gain from Whig			

Sheldon's death caused a by-election.

By-election, 1 July 1836: South Warwickshire
Party	Candidate	Votes	%
Conservative	Evelyn Shirley	1,885	58.1
Whig	Grey Skipwith	1,360	41.9
Majority		525	16.2
Turnout		3,245	81.2
Registered electors		3,997	
Conservative gain from Radical			

General election 1837: South Warwickshire
Party	Candidate	Votes	%
Conservative	John Mordaunt	Unopposed	
Conservative	Evelyn Shirley	Unopposed	
Registered electors		4,304	
Conservative hold			
Conservative gain from Radical			

=== Elections in the 1840s ===
General election 1841: South Warwickshire
Party	Candidate	Votes	%	±%
Conservative	John Mordaunt	Unopposed		
Conservative	Evelyn Shirley	Unopposed		
Registered electors		4,261		
Conservative hold				
Conservative hold				

Mordaunt's death caused a by-election.

By-election, 5 November 1845: South Warwickshire
Party	Candidate	Votes	%	±%
Conservative	George Greville	Unopposed		
Conservative hold				

General election 1847: South Warwickshire
Party	Candidate	Votes	%	±%
Conservative	George Greville	Unopposed		
Conservative	Evelyn Shirley	Unopposed		
Registered electors		4,066		
Conservative hold				
Conservative hold				

Shirley resigned by accepting the office of Steward of the Chiltern Hundreds, causing a by-election.

By-election, 7 June 1849: South Warwickshire
Party	Candidate	Votes	%	±%
Conservative	Heneage Finch	Unopposed		
Conservative hold				

=== Elections in the 1850s ===
General election 1852: South Warwickshire
Party	Candidate	Votes	%	±%
Conservative	George Greville	Unopposed		
Conservative	Heneage Finch	Unopposed		
Registered electors		3,980		
Conservative hold				
Conservative hold				

Greville succeeded to the peerage, becoming 4th Earl of Warwick and causing a by-election.

By-election, 3 December 1853: South Warwickshire
Party	Candidate	Votes	%	±%
Conservative	Evelyn Shirley	Unopposed		
Conservative hold				

General election 1857: South Warwickshire
Party	Candidate	Votes	%	±%
Conservative	Evelyn Shirley	Unopposed		
Whig	Edward Bolton King	Unopposed		
Registered electors		3,522		
Conservative hold				
Whig gain from Conservative				

General election 1859: South Warwickshire
Party	Candidate	Votes	%	±%
Conservative	Evelyn Shirley	Unopposed		
Conservative	Charles Mordaunt	Unopposed		
Registered electors		3,470		
Conservative hold				
Conservative gain from Liberal				

=== Elections in the 1860s ===
General election 1865: South Warwickshire
Party	Candidate	Votes	%	±%
Conservative	Henry Christopher Wise	1,585	35.8	N/A
Conservative	Charles Mordaunt	1,517	34.3	N/A
Liberal	Viscount Duncan	1,321	29.9	New
Majority		196	4.4	N/A
Turnout		2,872 (est)	81.7 (est)	N/A
Registered electors		3,517		
Conservative hold		Swing	N/A	
Conservative hold		Swing	N/A	

General election 1868: South Warwickshire
Party	Candidate	Votes	%	±%
Conservative	Henry Christopher Wise	2,581	25.8	−10.0
Conservative	John Hardy	2,501	25.0	−9.3
Liberal	Robert Hamilton	2,472	24.7	+9.7
Liberal	Edward Villiers	2,453	24.5	+9.5
Majority		29	0.3	−4.1
Turnout		5,004 (est)	80.6 (est)	−1.1
Registered electors		6,205		
Conservative hold		Swing	−9.8	
Conservative hold		Swing	−9.5	

=== Elections in the 1870s ===
General election 1874: South Warwickshire
Party	Candidate	Votes	%	±%
Conservative	Earl of Yarmouth	2,832	36.3	+10.5
Conservative	John Eardley-Wilmot	2,801	35.9	+10.9
Liberal	Robert Hamilton	2,170	27.8	−21.4
Majority		631	8.1	+7.8
Turnout		4,987 (est)	78.7 (est)	−1.9
Registered electors		6,340		
Conservative hold		Swing	+10.6	
Conservative hold		Swing	+10.8	

Seymour was appointed Comptroller of the Household, causing a by-election.

By-election, 21 Feb 1879: South Warwickshire
Party	Candidate	Votes	%	±%
Conservative	Hugh Seymour	Unopposed		
Conservative hold				

=== Elections in the 1880s ===
General election 1880: South Warwickshire
Party	Candidate	Votes	%	±%
Conservative	John Eardley-Wilmot	2,644	34.3	−1.6
Liberal	Gilbert Leigh	2,550	33.1	+5.3
Conservative	Hugh Seymour	2,507	32.6	−3.7
Turnout		5,123 (est)	79.7 (est)	+1.0
Registered electors		6,429		
Majority		94	1.2	−6.9
Conservative hold		Swing	−2.7	
Majority		43	0.5	N/A
Liberal gain from Conservative		Swing	+3.7	

Leigh's death caused a by-election.

By-election, 10 Nov 1884: South Warwickshire
Party	Candidate	Votes	%	±%
Conservative	Sampson Lloyd	3,095	61.7	−5.2
Liberal	William Compton	1,919	38.3	+5.2
Majority		1,176	23.4	N/A
Turnout		5,014	76.1	−3.6
Registered electors		6,590		
Conservative gain from Liberal		Swing	−5.2	

== Sources ==
- Leigh Rayment's Historical List of MPs – Constituencies beginning with "W" (part 1)
