= Apology for Smectymnuus =

Final antiprelatical tract by John Milton

Apology for Smectymnuus, or An Apology for a Pamphlet, was published by John Milton in April 1642. It was the final of his antiprelatical tracts which criticize the structure of the Church of England.

== Background ==
The Apology was published in April 1642 as An Apology against a Pamphlet Called a Modest Confutation of the Animadversions upon the Remonstrant against Smectymnvvs and is his final antiprelatical tract. The tract was written as a response to a refutation by Bishop Joseph Hall.

== Tract ==
Milton argues that the defense of truth makes one vulnerable to personal attacks and emphasizes that role of personal integrity, especially his own: "as a member incorporate into that truth whereof I was perswaded". Milton defends his own integrity when he later writes: "that indeed according to art is most eloquent, which returns and approaches neerest to nature from whence it came; and they expresse nature best, who in their lives least wander from her safe leading, which may be call'd regenerate reason". This idea is expanded further when he says:

he who would not be frustrated of his hope to write well hereafter in laudable things, ought him selfe to bee a true Poem, that is, a composition, and patterne of the best and honourable things; not presuming to sing high praises of heroick men, or famous Cities, unlesse he have in himselfe the experience and the practice of all that which is praise-worthy.

== Themes ==
The Apology, like many of Milton's other tracts, praises Parliament and emphasizes that they are reformers and the basis of the country. The tract also connects truth of words with the individual's character. Paul Stevens emphasizes that the tract reflects how "Milton's self is produced in the process of writing" and that his self is put through "a series of culturally approved laterall transformations". In particular, Elizabeth Wheeler points out that the tract contains "Milton's understanding of Aristotle's definition of man as a political animal. Heroism lies in the risk of changing and being changed in verbal exchange."

== See also ==
- Smectymnuus
