= List of pamphlet wars =

This is a list of pamphlet wars in history. For several centuries after the printing press became common, people would print their own ideas in small pamphlets somewhat akin to modern blogs. While these could not be widely available via the internet they could "go viral", because others were free to reprint pamphlets they liked, and therefore ideas were widely spread. Counter-arguments would then be printed in opposing pamphlets, which might become popular themselves. A prolonged debate carried out this way changed society many times, until copyright laws effectively banned the propagation of ideas in this way.

- 1517 — The Protestant Reformation — Martin Luther's 95 Theses is simply the most famous salvo in a prolonged pamphlet war that ended up triggering the secession of much of Europe from the Catholic Church (and later reform of that organization), after similar efforts had failed in the past without the printing press to support them.
- 1640 — Bishops' Wars — John Milton participated in antiprelatical pamphlet wars, opposing the policies of William Laud.
- 1642 — The English Civil War — Much of the buildup to the actual civil war was driven by an extensive, often heated, debate via pamphlet.
- 1654 — The Nature of Free Will — Thomas Hobbes and John Bramhall engaged in an intense debate over the nature of free will in humanity.
- 1655 — Resettlement of the Jews in England — The legalization of the open practice of Judaism in England resulted in a pamphlet war, which because of its civil and abstract nature is sometimes credited as preventing the growth of antisemitism during the debate. This featured Puritan William Prynne writing in opposition and Margaret Fell, a founder of the Religious Society of Friends (Quakers) in support of liberalization.
- 1680 — The Popish Plot — An invented controversy used to drum up anti-Catholic hysteria in England and Scotland.
- 1688 — The Socinian controversy — A debate on christology by Church of England theologians. John Locke was a notable participant.
- 1697 — Nonconformity — Daniel Defoe was eventually imprisoned by Queen Anne as a nonconformist who had advocated for her predecessor, William III during a pamphlet war over his policies, including the arguably illegal maintenance of a standing army during peacetime, widely recognized as a threat to liberty, but defended by .
- 1707 — Queen Anne's Governor — A pamphlet war in Boston, criticizing Queen Anne's choice of governor for the Massachusetts Bay Colony, a proxy attack criticizing Queen Anne's War.
- 1721 — Bank of Ireland Charter — One of the many rhetorical conflicts in which Jonathan Swift took part, attacking what he and Daniel Defoe called "air money", certificates of gold or land deposits being used like paper money by the Bank of Ireland.
- 1764 — The Paxton Boys — Tension over a failure to protect a frontier village from tribal aggression peaked with a massacre of innocent Conestoga Indians. After Ben Franklin interceded, the conflict was primarily conducted through pamphleteering, which is seen by some as having proved a non-violent alternative to the previous violence.
- 1765 — The Stamp Act — A tax imposed on the American colonies after the Seven Years' War sparked a pamphlet war that helped set the terminology and arguments for the American Revolution a decade later.
- 1776 — The American Revolution — Progress toward secession from the British Empire was based primarily on debates carried out in pamphlet form, including outrage over the Boston Massacre and also the crucial publication that swung sentiment from reform to secession, Common Sense.
- 1787 — Federalism — In the US, the most famous pamphlet war was probably the debate over the US Constitution, between The Federalist Papers and The Anti-Federalist Papers, the former including James Madison, John Adams, and Alexander Hamilton, the latter George Clinton (writing as Cato), Melancton Smith (writing as Brutus), and Richard Henry Lee (writing as the Federal Farmer).
- 1789 — The Revolution Controversy — A literary struggle in England over how to view the French Revolution, and what it meant about monarchy and the right of self-determination, in general. This debate involved Thomas Paine, William Godwin, Mary Wollstonecraft, Edmund Burke, and Richard Price.
- 1809 — Christian Missions in India — A debate over the acceptability of British Christians attempting to convert colonies ruled by the empire, a practice that went against the tradition of non-interference in local religions.
