= Calamy =

Calamy is a surname. Notable people with the surname include:

- Edmund Calamy the Elder (1600–1666), English Presbyterian church leader and divine
- Edmund Calamy (historian) (1671–1732), English Nonconformist churchman and historian
- Laure Calamy (born 1975), French actress
