= Thomas Calvert (divine) =

English clergyman, ejected minister and author

Thomas Calvert (1606–1679) was an English Nonconformist divine in Derbyshire and York.

== Life ==
Thomas Calvert was born at York in 1606, and educated at St Peter's School, York and Sidney Sussex College, Cambridge. He served as chaplain of Sir Thomas Burdet, in Derbyshire, for some time, and afterwards held the vicarage of Trinity Church in the King's Court at York.

During the Commonwealth he held one of the four preacherships endowed by the Crown at the minster, besides the living of Allhallows, York. He was ejected from his living in 1662, was banished from York by the Five Mile Act, and "withdrew to the good Lady Berwicks, near Tadcaster."

In 1637 he conducted the funeral of the learned Lady Jane Burdett of Foremark, Derbyshire. He published an account of the funeral under the title of "The Wearie Souls Wish: Or, The Doves Wings being ...." in 1650.

He returned to York, where he died in March 1679, aged seventy-three. He had a son by whose extravagances he was much troubled, but found a congenial companion in his nephew James Calvert, and corresponded with the chief scholars of the time. He was well read in Hebrew.

== Works ==
His works were:

1. The Blessed Jew of Marocco, a Blackmoor made White, York, 1648. To this work, which is a translation (through the Latin) of the supposed testimony of Rabbi Samuel, a converted Jew, to the truth of Christianity, Calvert contributes annotations and a long diatribe on the medieval history of the Jews and the wretchedness of their condition at that time.
2. Heart-Salve for a wounded Soule: or Meditations of Comfort for Relief of a soul sick, of delayed prayers, and the hiding of God's countenance (a sermon on Psalm 143:7), and Eye-Salve for the blinde world (a sermon on Isaiah 57:1), York, 10 October 1647.
3. The Wise Merchant; or the peerless pearl, set forth in some meditations delivered in two sermons upon Matt. xiii. 45, 46, to the company of merchants in the city of York (sermons on Matthew 13:45, 46), London, 1660.

Calamy and Palmer enumerate many other sermons, including one preached at the funeral of Lady Burdet, and a translation of Gerard's Schola Consolatoria.

== See also ==
- Act of Uniformity 1662
- Great Ejection

== Sources ==
- Calamy, Edmund; Palmer, Samuel (1803). The Nonconformist's Memorial. 2nd ed. Vol. 3. London: J. Cundee, for Button and Son, and T. Hurst. pp. 458–459.
- McClintock, John; Strong, James (1885). "Calvert, Thomas". Cyclopædia of Biblical, Theological, and Ecclesiastical Literature. Supplement, Vol. 1. New York: Harper & Brothers. p. 746.

Attribution

- This article incorporates text from a publication now in the public domain: Lee, Sidney (1886). "Calvert, Thomas (1606-1679)". In Stephen, Leslie (ed.). Dictionary of National Biography. Vol. 8. London: Smith, Elder & Co. pp. 274–275.
