= Edmund Calamy =

Edmund Calamy may refer to:

- Edmund Calamy the Elder (1600–1666), English Puritan divine
- Edmund Calamy the Younger (died in 1685), English Puritan divine, son of Edmund Calamy the Elder
- Edmund Calamy (historian) (1671–1732), British Puritan divine, son of Edmund Calamy the Younger
- Edmund Calamy IV (1697?–1755), son of the historian, dissenting minister
