= Alfonso Buenhombre =

Dominican missionary and polemist

The Most Reverend Alfonso Buenhombre OP
- Bishop of Morocco
- Church: Roman Catholic Church
- Archdiocese: Archdiocese of Toledo
- Diocese: Diocese of Morocco
- In office: 1336–?

Alfonso Buenhombre (Latin: Alphonsus Bonihominis; died c. 1353) was a Dominican missionary and polemicist.

== Life ==
Alfonso was born, probably in Galicia, or perhaps in Toledo, at the close of the 13th century. He travelled to Egypt in 1336, and to Morocco. He became Bishop of Morocco in 1344. He died, probably at Marrakesh, about 1353.

== Works ==
The celebrated anti-Jewish writing called Epistola Samuelis Maroccani ('Epistle of Samuel the Moroccan'), which gives in twenty-seven chapters a refutation of Jewish objections to the Christian faith, is said to have been translated from Arabic or Hebrew into Latin by Alfonsus Bonihominis in 1329, under the title, Tractatulus multum utilis ad convincendum Judaeos de errore suo, quem habent de Messia adhuc venturo, et de observantia legis Mosaiae ('A very useful treatise to convince the Jews of their error, which they have about the Messiah yet to come, and about the observance of the Mosaic law').

Including the first printed edition of 1475, this tract went through at least nine editions in Latin, (Note: Translated often since, and has been inserted in the Bibliotheca Patrum, xviii. (1519)) five in German, (Note: Translated by W. Link (Altenburg, 1524), and inserted in Luther's works, v, 567–583; and often since; by E. Trautmann (Goslar, 1706); by F. G. Stieldorff (Trier, 1833)) and one in Italian. (Note: Translated by G. F. Brunati (Trident. 1712)) In the Escurial there exists a Spanish translation in manuscript. A Russian version was issued in 1855 by the Kiev Pecherskaya Lavra (Monastery). An English version by Thomas Calvert appeared at York in 1649 under the title, The Blessed Jew of Morocco; or, the black Moor Made white. There exists also, in manuscript, a Disputatio Abutalib Saraceni et Samuelis Judæi, consisting of seven epistles, translated from Arabic into Latin by Alfonsus Bonihominis.

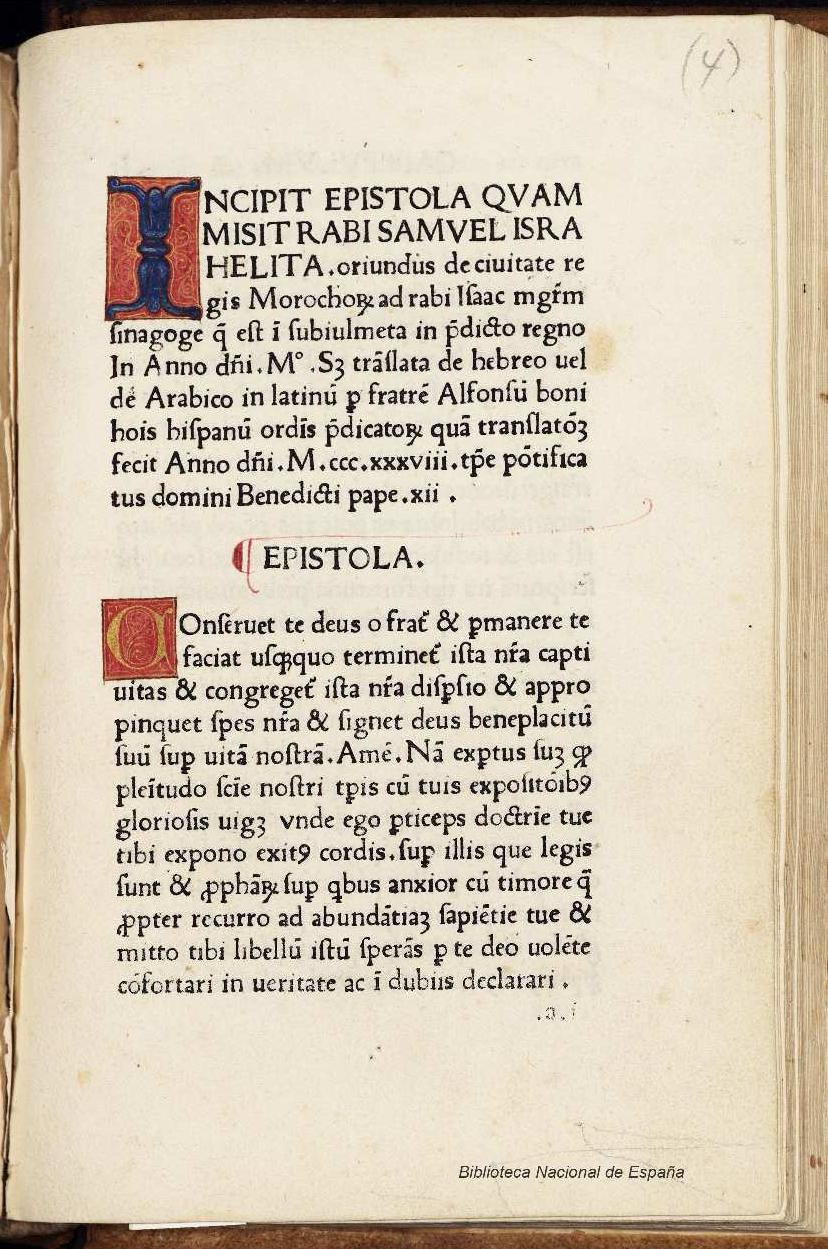
Incipit of a MS. of the Epistola ad Rabbi Isaac (1480–84)

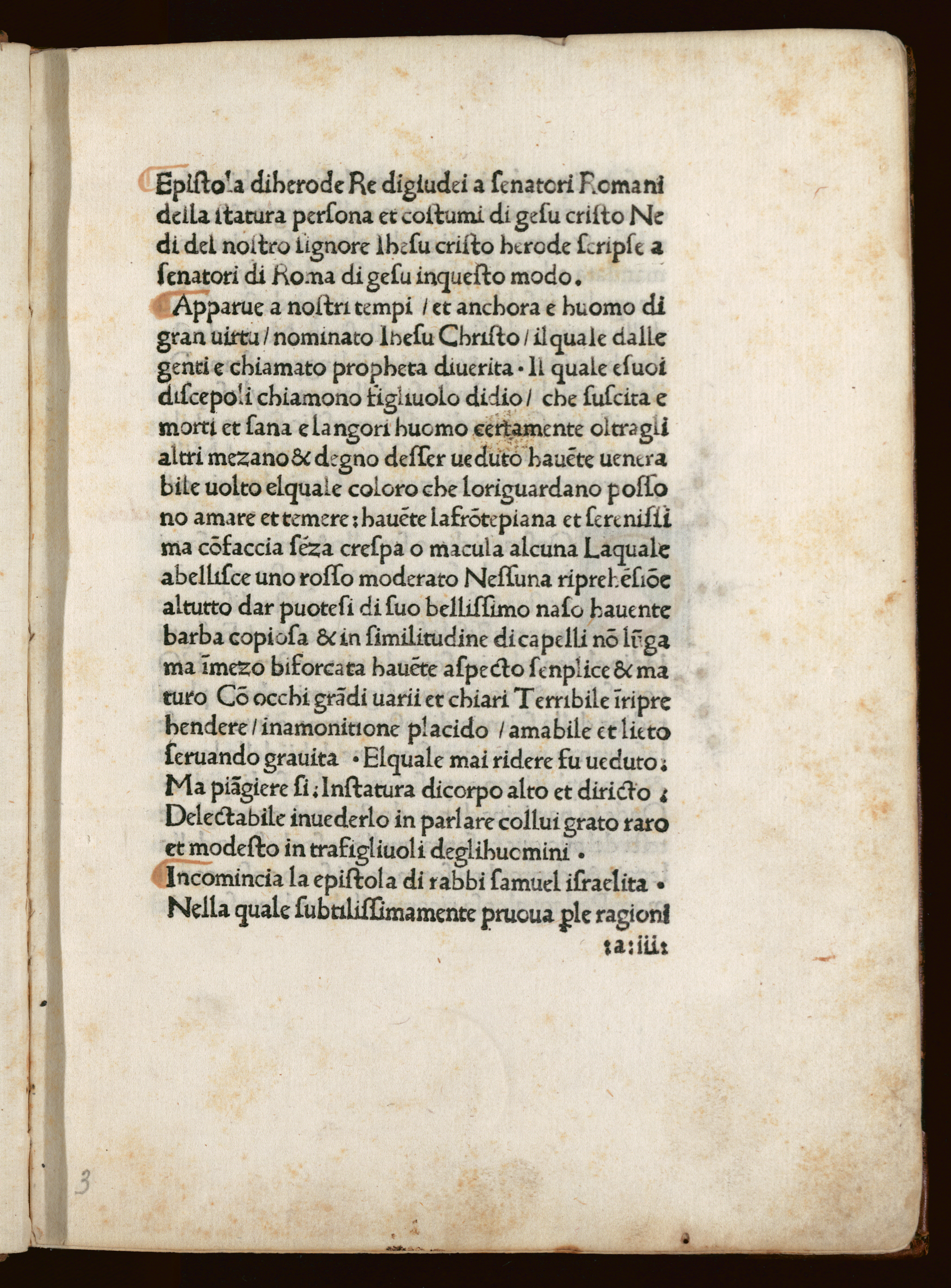
From another MS. of the Epistola contra Iudaeorum errores (c. 1479)

== See also ==
- History of Jewish conversion to Christianity
- Adversus Judaeos

== Sources ==
- Biosca, Antoni (2010). "Alfonso Buenhombre". Thomas, David; Mallett, Alex (eds.). Christian-Muslim Relations 600–1500. Brill. Retrieved 15 August 2022.
- Biosca i Bas, Antoni (2015). "The Anti-Muslim Discourse of Alfonso Buenhombre". Szpiech, Ryan (ed.). Medieval Exegesis and Religious Difference. New York: Fordham UP. Retrieved 15 August 2022.
- Di Cesare, Michelina (2011). "Alfonso Buenhombre, The Disputation between Abutalib the Saracen and Samuel the Jew; The Letter of Samuel". The Pseudo-historical Image of the Prophet Muhammad in Medieval Latin Literature: A Repertory. Berlin, Boston: De Gruyter. Retrieved 15 August 2022.
- Hirschfeld, Hartwig; Gottheil, Richard (1901). "Abbas, Samuel Abu Naṣr Ibn". In Singer, Isidore; et al. (eds.). The Jewish Encyclopedia. Vol. 1. New York: Funk & Wagnalls. p. 38.
- Limor, Ora (1997). "The Epistle of Rabbi Samuel of Morocco: A Best-Seller in the World of Polemics". In Limor, Ora; Stroumsa, Guy G. (eds.). Contra Iudaeos: Ancient and Medieval Polemics Between Christians and Jews. Tübingen: Mohr Siebeck. pp. 177–194.
- McClintock, John; Strong, James (1876). "Morocco, Samuel Israeli of". Cyclopædia of Biblical, Theological, and Ecclesiastical Literature. Vol. 6. New York: Harper & Brothers. pp. 649–650.
- Vauchez, André, ed. (2005). "Alfonso Buenhombre". Oxford Encyclopedia of the Middle Ages. Oxford Reference. Retrieved 15 August 2022.
