= Edward Haynes =

English astronomer

Edward Haynes or Haines (fl. 1683–1708) was an English astronomer and Fellow of the Royal Society.

Haynes observed the lunar eclipse of 11 February 1682 from Basing Lane in London, an event also observed by Edmond Halley and John Flamsteed, at Greenwich. He was elected a Fellow of the Royal Society on 2 May 1683, nominated by Flamsteed and Halley.

A nonconformist, Haynes was in the congregation of Edmund Calamy the Younger, who died at his house in Totteridge, then in Hertfordshire A later published observation from Totteridge noted its distance from London and displacement to the west.
