= Jane Burdett =

Primrose League leading member

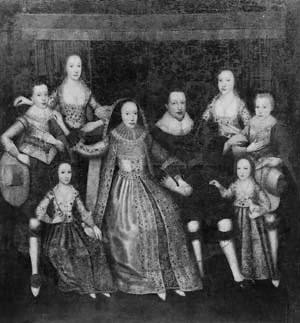
- Burdett and her family from about 1620

Jane Burdett born Jane Francis became Jane, Lady Burdett (d. 1637). She lived at Foremark in Derbyshire and she was known for her learning.

== Life ==
Burdett's birthplace and date are not known but she was the daughter (possibly only child) of Elizabeth and William Francis of the small hamlet of Foremark. Her mother's father was William Francis and she came from the south Derbyshire village of Ticknall. She is presumed to have been a minor when she married Thomas Burdett from Bramcote in Warwickshire as he was not yet an adult.

Her husband was created a baronet on 25 February 1619 and she became Lady Burnett. At about this time a painting was made of the family and this includes six children.

Her husband had been High Sheriff of Derbyshire and they had at least five children. Jane was renowned for her learning. She was known as a literary patron and it has been speculated that she was a poet and muse. She may have held a salon as part of the circle of John Newdigate who later wrote poetry about her abilities.

== Death and legacy ==
She died in 1637.

In 1650 Thomas Calvert published an account of her funeral under the title of "The Wearie Souls Wish: Or, The Doves Wings being ...." Poems are included in the publication which may have been used at her funeral.

A painting made of the family in about 1620 is in the National Portrait Gallery.
