= Samuel Israeli of Morocco =

Moroccan author of the second half of the 11th century

Samuel Israeli of Morocco (Latin: Samuel Marochitanus, Samuelis Maroccani) was a supposed Jewish convert to Christianity who lived at the close of the 11th century. The details of his life and the works ascribed to him have been shown to be likely 15th century forgeries.

== Legend ==
Samuel Israeli is said to have come to Toledo from Fez, in Morocco, about the year 1085, where he became a convert to Christianity. According to Christian tradition, before his conversion was completed he addressed a letter to Rabbi Isaac, a Jew in the Kingdom of Morocco, in which he says:

I would fain learn of thee, out of the testimony of the law and the prophets, and other Scriptures, why the Jews are thus smitten. Is this a captivity wherein we are, which may be properly called the perpetual anger of God, because it has no end; for it is now above a thousand years since we were carried captive by Titus? And yet our fathers, who worshipped idols, killed the prophets, and cast the law behind their back, were punished only with a seventy-years' captivity, and then brought home again. But now there is no end of our calamities, nor do the prophets promise any.

Soon after his conversion Rabbi Samuel appears to have returned to Morocco, whence his surname, and there to have held a conference on religion with a learned Muslim, of which what purports to be his account, in MS., is to be found in the library of the Escurial.

== Transmission ==
The famous epistle to Rabbi Isaac, אגרת, which was originally written in Arabic, and gives in twenty-seven chapters a refutation of Jewish objections to the Christian faith, was translated from the Hebrew into the Latin by the Dominican Alfonso de Buen Hombre (Alfonsus Bonihominis) in 1329, under the title, Tractatulus multum utilis ad convincendum Judæos de errore suo, quem habent de Messia adhuc venturo, et de observantia legis Mosaicæ ('A very useful treatise to convince the Jews of their error, which they have about the Messiah yet to come, and about the observance of the Mosaic law'), and often since, and has been inserted in the Bibliotheca Patrum, xviii, 1519; into Italian by G. F. Brunati (Trident. 1712); into German by W. Link (Altenburg, 1524), and inserted in Luther's works, v, 567–583; and often since; by E. Trautmann (Goslar, 1706); by F. G. Stieldorff (Trier, 1833); into English by Th. Calvert, under the title, Demonstration of the true Messiah, by R. Samuel, a converted Jew. A Spanish translation of this letter still remains in MS. in the library of the Escurial.

It has, however, been suggested that the Epistola Samuelis Maroccani was actually compiled much later, in the 15th century, as a piece of popular anti-Jewish writing.

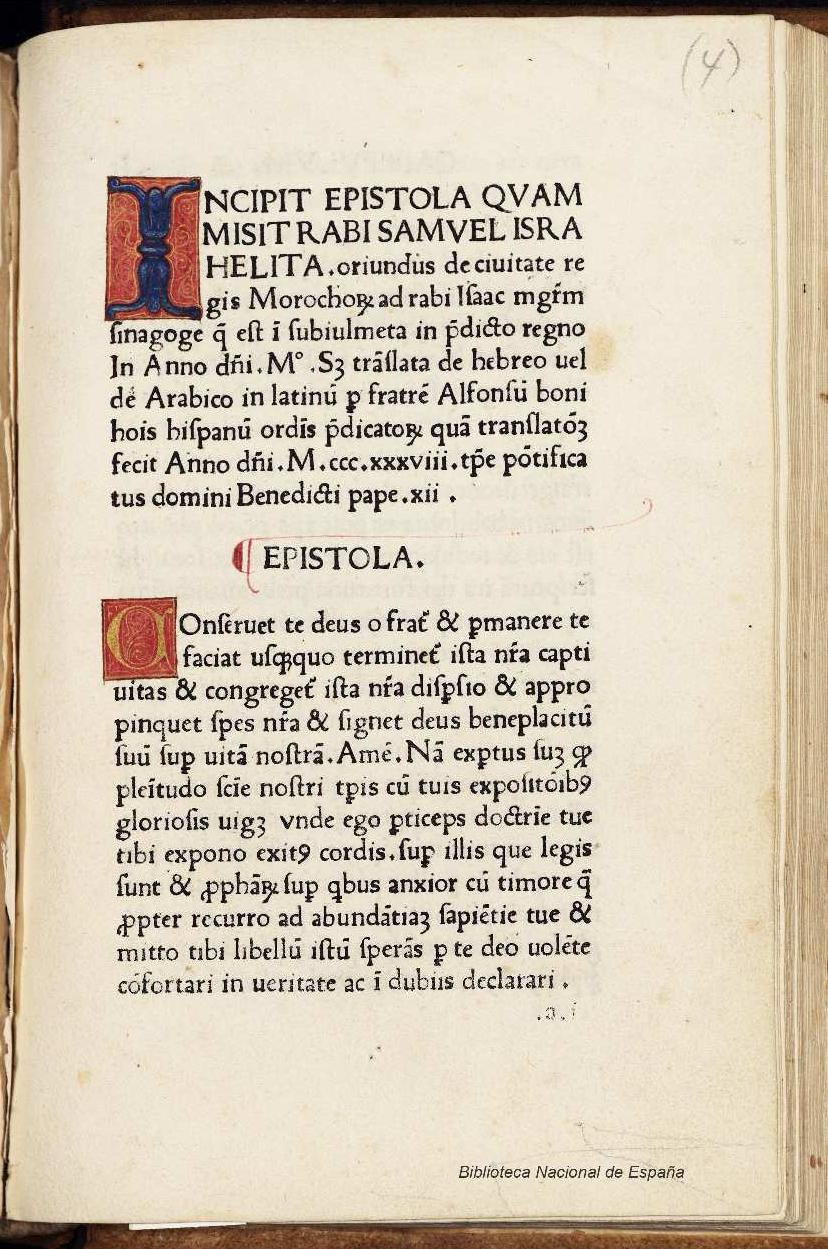
Incipit of a MS. of the Epistola ad Rabbi Isaac (1480–84)

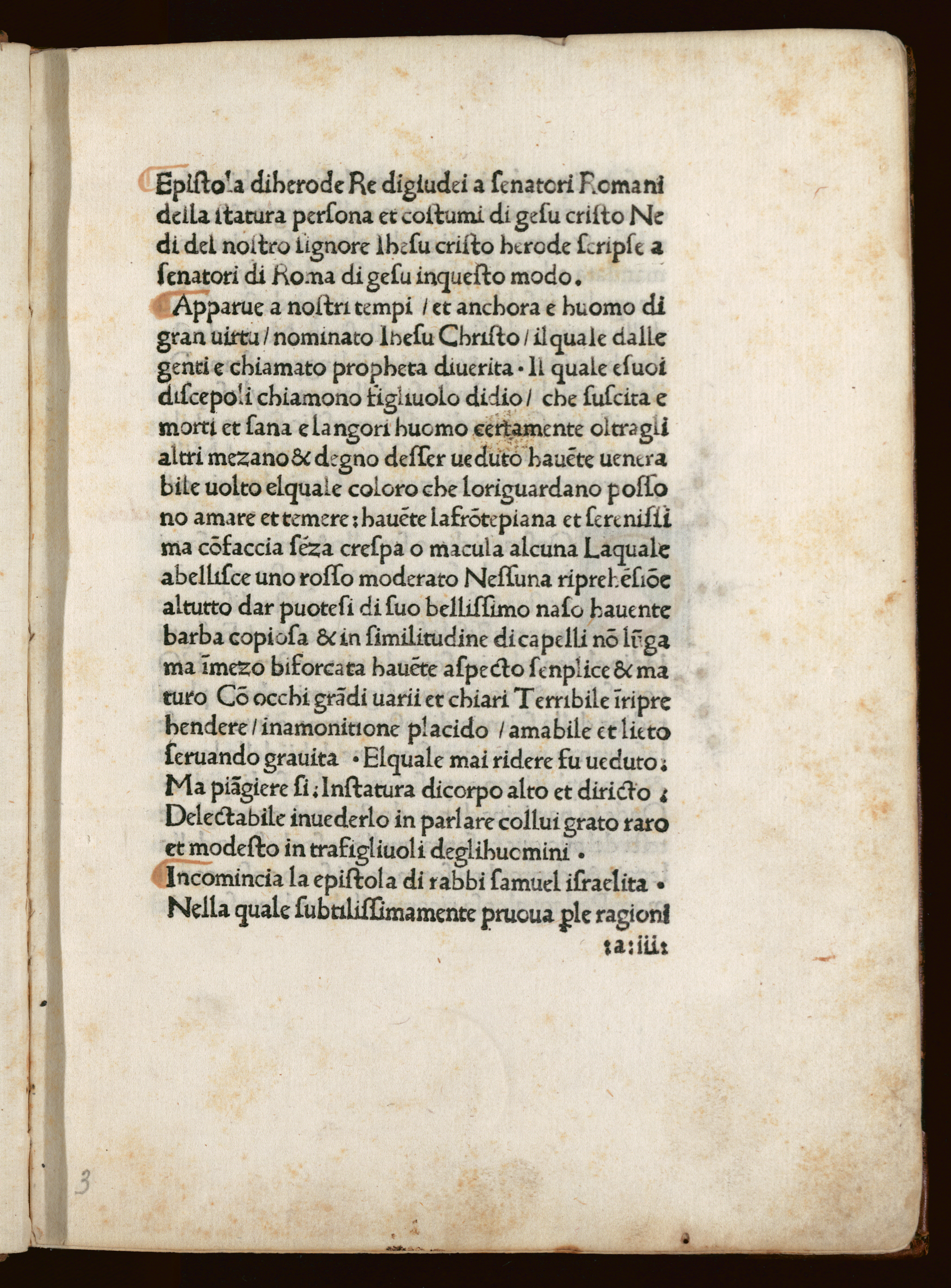
From another MS. of the Epistola contra Iudaeorum errores (c. 1479)

== See also ==
- History of Jewish conversion to Christianity
- Adversus Judaeos

== Sources ==
- Etheridge, John Wesley (1856). Jerusalem and Tiberias, Sora and Cordova: A Survey of the Religious and Scholastic Learning of the Jews. London: Longman, Brown, Green, and Longmans. p. 285.
- Hirschfeld, Hartwig; Gottheil, Richard (1901). "Abbas, Samuel Abu Naṣr Ibn". In Singer, Isidore; et al. (eds.). The Jewish Encyclopedia. Vol. 1. New York: Funk & Wagnalls. p. 38.
- Limor, Ora (1997). "The Epistle of Rabbi Samuel of Morocco: A Best-Seller in the World of Polemics". In Limor, Ora; Stroumsa, Guy G. (eds.). Contra Iudaeos: Ancient and Medieval Polemics Between Christians and Jews. Tübingen: Mohr Siebeck. pp. 177–194.
- The blessed Jew of Marocco: or, A Blackmoor made white. being a demonstration of the true Messias out of the law and prophets / by Rabbi Samuel, a Iew turned Christian; written first in the Arabick, after translated into Latin, and now Englished; to which are annexed a diatriba of the Jews sins and their miserie all over the world, annotations to the book … with other things for profit in knowledge and understanding, by Tho. Calvert …. Printed at York: By T. Broad, and are to be sold by Nath. Brookes …, 1648.

Attribution:
