= Westminster College (Missouri) =

Private college in Fulton, Missouri, US

Coordinates: 38.8483°N 91.956°W

- Former names: Fulton College (1851–1853)
- Motto: Religio et Scientia
- Motto in English: Faith and Knowledge
- Type: Private liberal arts college
- Established: 1851; 175 years ago
- Founder: Rev. William W. Robertson
- Endowment: $57.1 million (2021)
- President: Donald P. Lofe, Jr.
- Faculty: 88
- Administrative staff: 108 (2021)
- Students: 609 (2020)
- Location: Fulton, Missouri, United States
- Campus: Rural town, 86 acres (0.13 sq mi; 34.80 ha)
- Colors: Navy blue, light blue, and white
- Nickname: Blue Jays
- Sporting affiliations: NCAA Division III – SLIAC – Upper Midwest Athletic Conference
- Mascot: Winston the Blue Jay
- Website: wcmo.edu

Westminster College is a private liberal arts college in Fulton, Missouri, United States. It was established in 1851 as Fulton College. The school enrolled 609 students in 2020. America's National Churchill Museum is a historic site located on campus.

== History ==
=== 1851–1999 ===
Westminster College was founded as a college for young men by the Rev. William W. Robertson and local Presbyterians in 1851 as "Fulton College" and assumed the present name in 1853. Throughout the next century, Westminster College continued to be an all-male institution until the first coeducational class in 1979.

In 1909, the original Westminster Hall was destroyed by fire, leaving only the six Corinthian columns which helped support it. Since then, the columns have been restored and serve as the site of a symbolic rite of passage for new and graduating students. During the convocation ceremony at the beginning of students' first year, students walk through the columns towards the campus, and then back through towards Westminster Avenue after their graduation ceremony at the end of their senior year.

Westminster College was the site of former U.K. prime minister Winston Churchill's famous "Sinews of Peace" speech in 1946. Less than one year after the end of World War II, Churchill lectured about the state of world political affairs, notably regarding the growing tension in Europe during the prelude to the Cold War.

From Stettin in the Baltic to Trieste in the Adriatic an "iron curtain" has descended across the continent. Behind that line lie all the capitals of the ancient states of Central and Eastern Europe. Warsaw, Berlin, Prague, Vienna, Budapest, Belgrade, Bucharest and Sofia; all these famous cities and the populations around them lie in what I must call the Soviet sphere, and all are subject, in one form or another, not only to Soviet influence but to a very high and in some cases increasing measure of control from Moscow.

— Winston Churchill

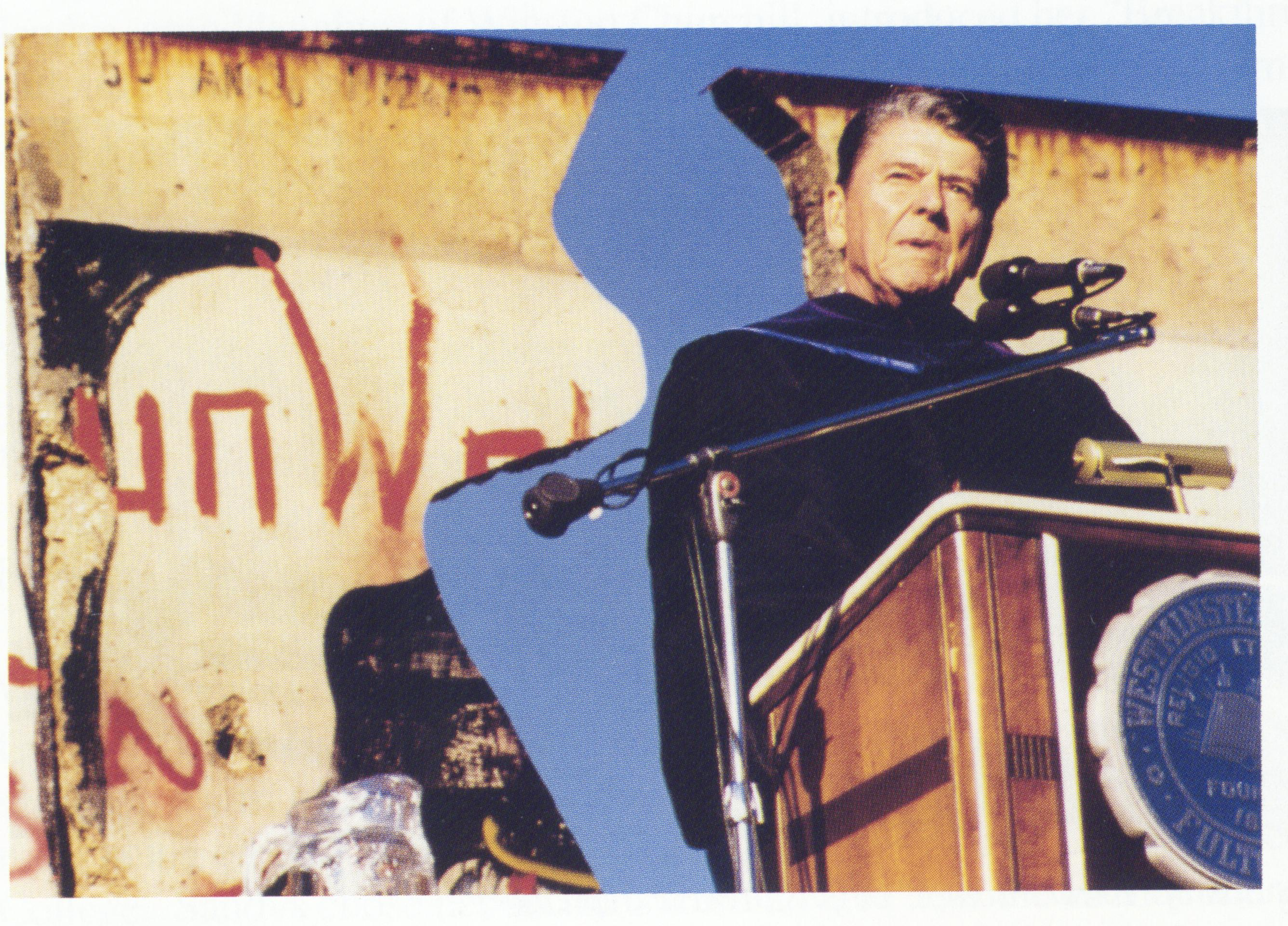
Ronald Reagan lecturing at Westminster College

In 1969, Westminster College dedicated one of its most recognizable landmarks, the Church of St. Mary the Virgin, Aldermanbury. Originally built in the City of London in the 12th century, it was destroyed during the Great Fire of London in 1666. It was rebuilt by Christopher Wren in 1677, and then was gutted by the Blitz in 1940. It stayed in London until 1966, when it was transported stone by stone to Fulton and reassembled on the Westminster College campus. The undercroft of the church is now home to America's National Churchill Museum.

Also in 1969, Westminster College became independent of the Presbyterian Church, but it continues to maintain a loose affiliation today with the Presbyterian Church (USA).

=== 2000–present ===
The endowment grew from $27 million in 2000 to its current $57.1 million. Westminster began offering online classes in 2011. The Churchill Institute for Global Engagement was created in 2013 to further global education with new academic programs and global initiatives. This period also saw the establishment of new corporate and academic partnerships, including dual-degree program agreements with Washington University in St. Louis, Logan University College of Chiropractic, Missouri University of Science and Technology, Goldfarb School of Nursing at Barnes-Jewish College, and Culver–Stockton College.

=== Presidents ===
From its founding in 1851 through 1854 and again from 1861 to 1864, the college was overseen by the chairmanship of the faculty, which rotated among faculty members, instead of a president.

== Academics ==
Academic Divisions and Departments include Humanities, Natural and Mathematical Sciences, and Social Sciences. The college offers 29 majors, 39 minors, 3 specialty programs, and 4 dual-degree programs. Westminster's Cadaver Program, which began as a small independent study in the fall of 2005, is offered for pre-med, biology, and psychology students who can explore the anatomy of the human body through scientific dissection.

=== Pre-professional programs and academic partnerships ===
Pre-professional programs/academic partnerships at Westminster are Dual-Degree Engineering with Washington University in St. Louis or Missouri University of Science and Technology, Dual-Degree Nursing with the Goldfarb School of Nursing at Barnes-Jewish College, Dual-Degree Chiropractic with Logan University College of Chiropractic, and most recently a 3+2 accelerated Master of Athletic Training program with Culver–Stockton College. Westminster has also partnered with Ameren UE in Missouri and Illinois to offer continuing education and degree completion programs for the Ameren's employees.

=== Mentoring program and seminar ===
All incoming students are provided with two seminar mentors and a seminar professor who will advise students throughout their years at Westminster College. To make the transition from high school to college easier, mentors help orient students to their new life at Westminster and provide guidance in the areas of academics, social and residential life.

=== Campus lectures ===
Since Winston Churchill delivered his "Iron Curtain" speech on campus, Westminster consistently attracts world leaders through its variety of campus lectures. Included among the speakers are senators, former presidents, current or retired generals, admirals, and intelligence officers. Past and recent speakers include former U.S. presidents Gerald Ford, George H. W. Bush, and Ronald Reagan; former Soviet president Mikhail Gorbechev; Jeh Johnson, former U.S. secretary of Homeland Security; U.S. Senator Bernie Sanders; and former U.S. secretary of State Madeleine Albright.

== Campus ==
- Westminster College Historic District
- U.S. National Register of Historic Places
- U.S. Historic district
- Location within Missouri Location within the United States
- Location: Off Westminster Ave., Fulton, Missouri
- Area: 18 acres (7.3 ha)
- Architect: Multiple
- Architectural style: Colonial Revival, Classical Revival
- NRHP reference No.: 82004633
- Added to NRHP: April 12, 1982

The Westminster College Historic District was added to the National Register of Historic Places in 1982. It encompasses nine contributing buildings and six contributing objects. They include the Hall of Science (1900–1901), Steam Heating Plant (1919–1920), The Columns ("Old" Westminster Hall) (1853–1854), Westminster Hall (1909–1911), the Gymnasium (1928), Swope Chapel Memorial (1967), Washington West House (1907), Re-Union Hall (1903), and Reeves Library (1950–1951).

=== Historic Westminster Gymnasium ===
The Gym was built in 1928 and completely renovated in 1972. This National Historic Landmark is where Winston Churchill presented his "Iron Curtain" speech in March 1946. Vice President Dick Cheney also visited the college during the 2004 campaign and spoke in the Gym. When new bleachers were installed, the old bleachers were recycled into new lockers for the men's and women's locker rooms. The floor has been renamed for Henry "Hank" Iba, Class of 1927, who was an all-state basketball, football, and baseball player at Westminster before going on to coach Oklahoma State University to two national basketball titles and the U.S. Olympics basketball team to two gold medals. The Gym houses a basketball/volleyball court, athletic offices, and an exercise room. It also housed an indoor swimming pool until 2016.

=== Westminster Hall ===
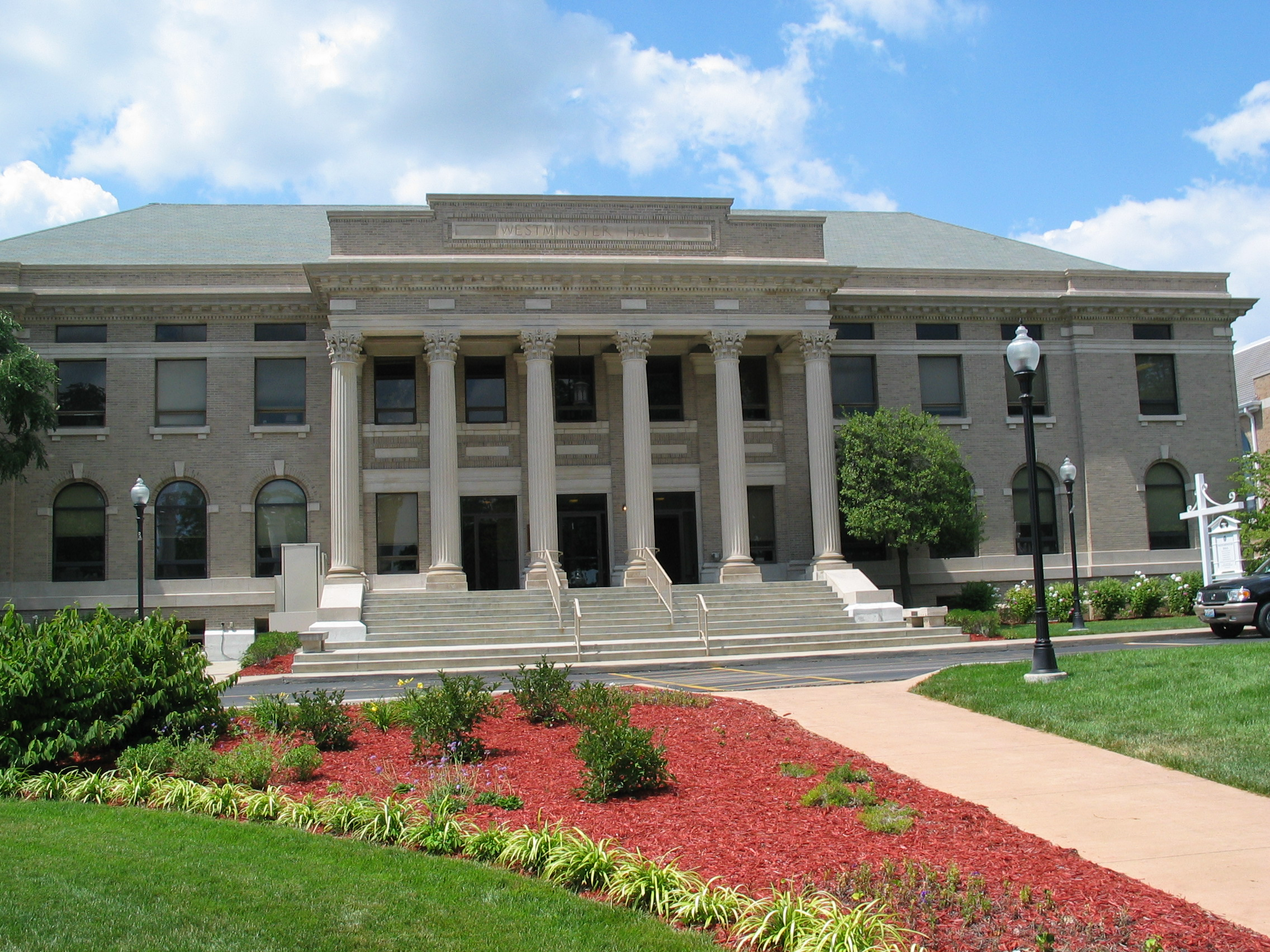
Westminster Hall on Westminster College Campus, Fulton MO

This hall was built in 1911 and renovated in 1973–74. It is the main administrative building on campus and houses the Business Office, the Registrar, and Dean of Faculty offices, along with two classrooms. The lower-level houses Westminster's Wellness Center (Health and Counseling Services) and the Tomnitz Family Learning Opportunities Center.

=== The Columns ===
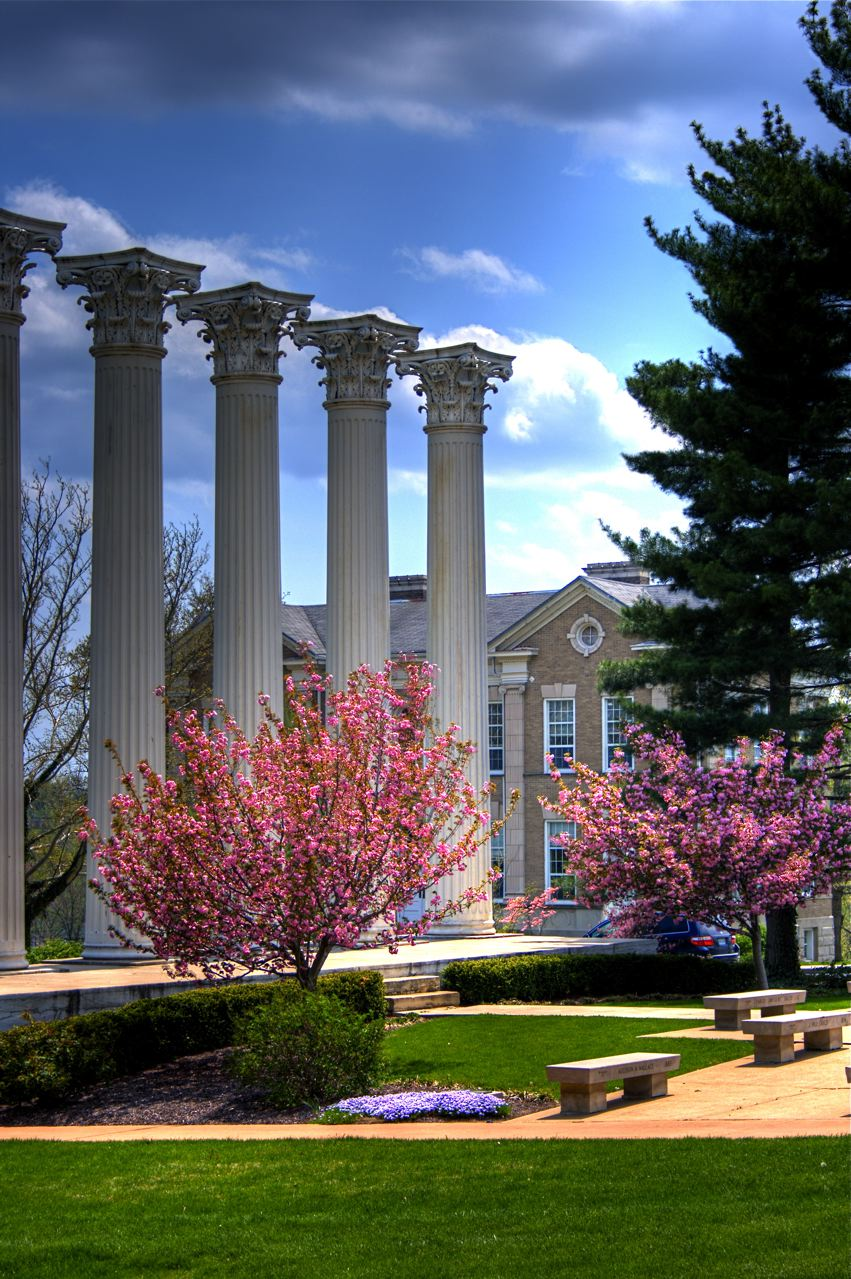
"The Columns", the only remains of the original Westminster Hall

These columns are the only remains of the first Westminster Hall built in 1854 and destroyed by fire in 1909. These Columns are the center of a campus tradition, the Columns Ceremony.

=== Newnham Hall ===
It was originally built in 1901 and is the oldest building on campus. It was completely renovated and remodeled in early 1970 as a gift of an alumnus.

=== Reeves Library and the Student Success Center ===
Reeves Library was built in 1951 and expanded & renovated in 1981 and again in 1996. In 2020, the library grew to incorporate a new Student Success Center. The building houses a collection of more than 100,000 volumes readily available in-house for students and faculty. It is a member of the statewide consortium of 50 academic libraries. The Hazel Wing was dedicated in October 1996 and serves as the technological center on the campus, housing four computer labs, video editing equipment, a multimedia classroom, a language lab, small group meeting, and study rooms as well as offices for the Department of Information Technology. With the addition of the Student Success Center, various student services were brought under one roof, including the Greg Richard Office of Advising and Career Development, a gift from an alumnus and former trustee; the Office of Global Educational Services; and the WCares Program.

=== Hunter Activity Center ===
Otherwise known as the "HAC", this building is a common area for both faculty and students. Downstairs is the Johnson College Inn (known to students as "JCI") grill/snack bar which is surrounded by ping-pong tables, pool tables, campus mailboxes, and the TV lounge. Upstairs houses meeting rooms and the HAC Gym. Westminster's HAC Gym includes a racquetball court, indoor track, weight equipment, and workout room and is the site for most intramural sports.

=== Champ Auditorium ===
This large building was built in 1966 and seats 1,400 people for concerts, lectures, music productions, and other college events such as commencement and Freshmen Convocation. A wide variety of notable individuals have spoken at Champ Auditorium since the building's completion, including rock musician and global humanitarian Bob Geldof, former U.S. Secretary of Homeland Security Jeh Johnson, Sen. Bernie Sanders, and former U.S. Secretary of State Madeleine Albright.

=== Breakthrough ===
Breakthrough is a sculpture consisting of eight sections of the Berlin Wall. It commemorates the collapse of the Iron Curtain and the end of the Cold War. The sculpture is the work of artist Edwina Sandys, granddaughter of Winston Churchill. It was dedicated to Westminster College in 1990 by former President Ronald Reagan.

=== Church of St. Mary the Virgin, Aldermanbury ===
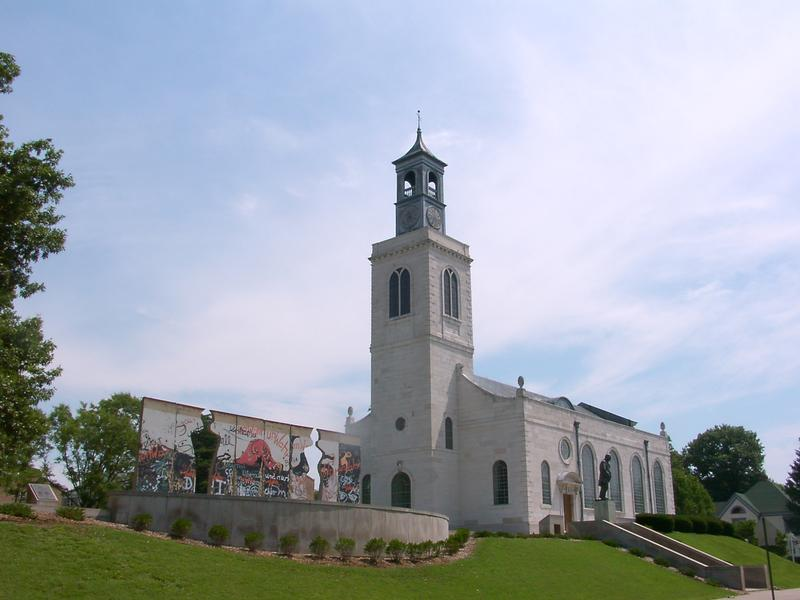
Christopher Wren designed Church of St Mary Aldermanbury, rebuilt at Westminster College, Missouri

The predecessor of this church building was originally constructed in London during the 12th century, but it burned down in the Great Fire of London in 1666. This church was erected as its replacement by Christopher Wren in the 17th century. During World War II, the Wren church was gutted by German bombs and in the mid-1960s, it was dismantled and shipped stone by stone to Fulton and reconstructed on Westminster's campus. Today, the church serves as the college's chapel. While it is occasionally claimed that St. Mary's is the oldest church in North America, the statement is not accurate. The transported Wren building is not the original 12th Century building of the St. Mary Aldermanbury parish of London. It is instead the replacement that was built under Wren's direction between 1672 and 1677, containing a single set of stairs from the medieval period, being an almost entirely new construction made largely of Portland stone that Wren had quarried in Dorset. This would make it considerably newer than such ancient North American buildings as the church of San Francisco in Tlaxcala, Mexico, whose construction began in 1521.

=== America's National Churchill Museum ===
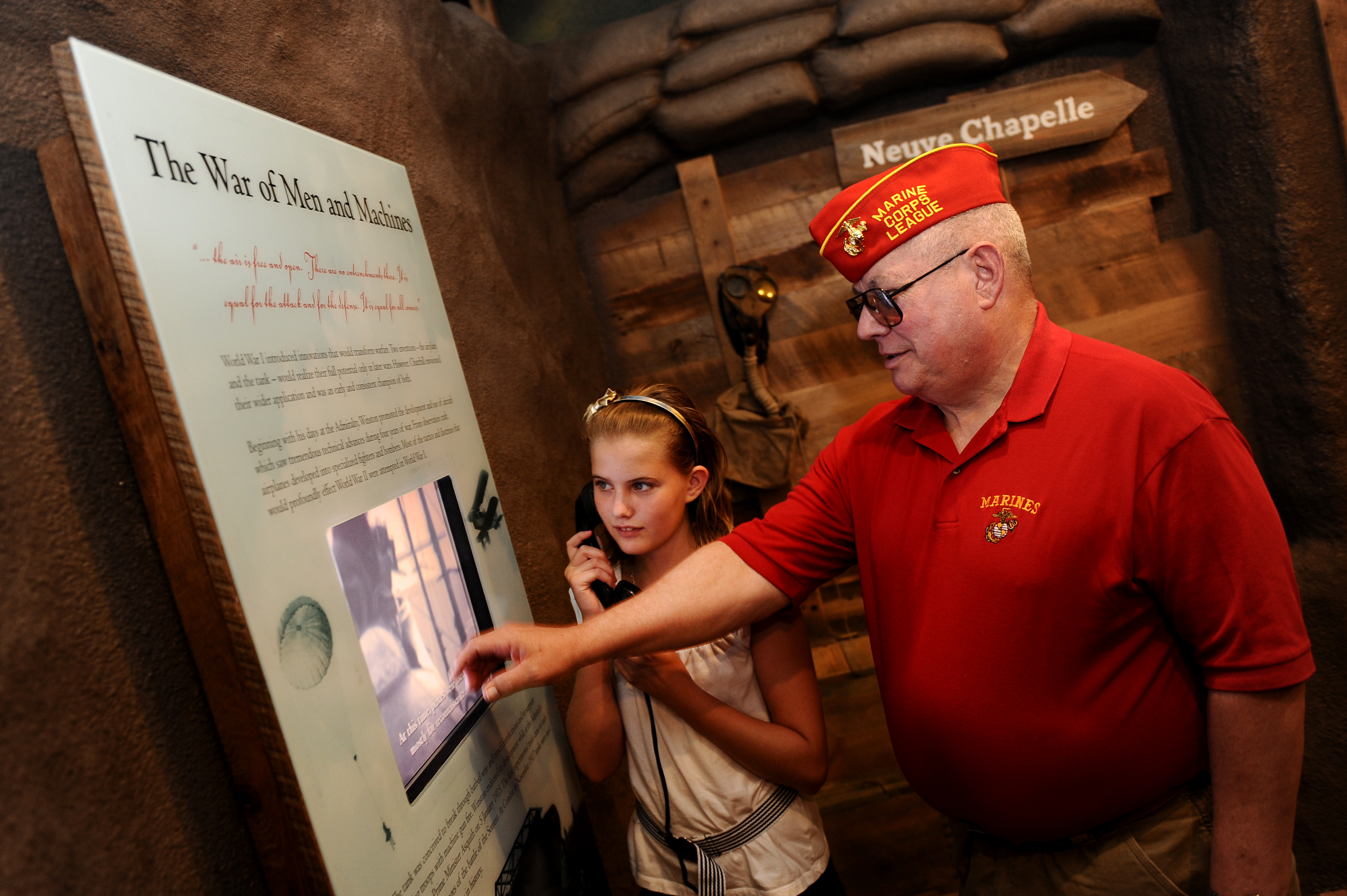
People visiting a World War I exhibit at the National Churchill Museum, located on the Westminster College Campus

Located below the Church of St. Mary the Virgin, Aldermanbury, this state-of-the-art museum is devoted to Sir Winston Churchill. In 2005, the building underwent a $4 million renovation and reopened in March 2006, marking the 60th anniversary of Churchill's speech at Westminster. This museum features interactive exhibits about Churchill, World War II, Sir Christopher Wren, and the Church of St. Mary, the Virgin, Aldermanbury. The Museum also showcases traveling and temporary exhibits, archival resources for scholarly research, and a gift shop with unique "Churchillian" merchandise.

=== Residential life ===
Westminster College manages and maintains nine residence halls as well as a limited number of residential homes for student occupancy. In addition, the six national fraternities for men operate their own independent living units. New students are generally assigned to Gage, Marquess, Rice, Scott, and Sloss Halls, which compose the Churchill Quadrangle. Westminster's upper-class students live either in one of the four upper-class residence halls (Emerson, Wetterau, Weigle, Sweazey), Westminster Apartments, an on-campus residential house, Westminster Townhouses, or a national fraternity house. Members of Westminster's national sororities live in designated floors of three residence halls.

== Student life ==
2020 student demographics
Approx. 605-degree-seeking students
56% male
44% female
77% of student body composed of White, non-Hispanic students
10% of student body composed of Black or African American students
5% of student body composed of two or more races
2% of student body composed of Hispanic/Latino students
2% of student body composed of Asian students
2% of student body composed of non-Alien students

=== Clubs and organizations ===
Westminster students can pick from over 50 clubs and organizations to become involved in on campus. Honorary societies include: Alpha Chi, Alpha Mu Gamma, Beta Beta Beta, FMA National Honor Society, Gamma Theta Upsilon, Kappa Delta Pi, Omicron Delta Kappa, Phi Alpha Delta, Phi Alpha Theta, Pi Mu Epsilon, Psi Chi, Phi Sigma Alpha, Phi Sigma Tau, Sigma Tau Delta, and Theta Alpha Kappa.

=== Greek life ===
Westminster College has a well-established history of Greek Life, dating to 1868. Approximately 47% of students are members of Greek organizations.

== Athletics ==
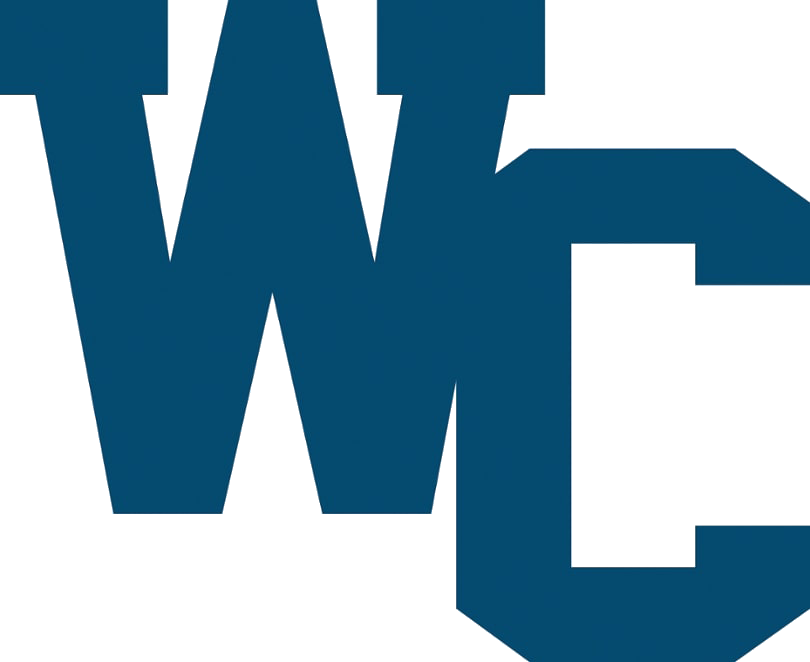
Westminster athletics monogram

The Westminster athletic teams are called the Blue Jays. The college is a member of the Division III level of the National Collegiate Athletic Association (NCAA), primarily competing in the St. Louis Intercollegiate Athletic Conference (SLIAC) since the 1990–91 academic year. The Blue Jays previously competed in the Missouri College Athletic Union (MCAU) of the National Association of Intercollegiate Athletics (NAIA) from 1924–25 to 1931–32. The school mascot is Winston the Blue Jay.

Westminster competes in 18 intercollegiate varsity sports. Men's sports include baseball, basketball, cross country, football, golf, soccer, tennis, track & field and wrestling; while women's sports include basketball, cross country, golf, soccer, softball, tennis, track & field, volleyball and wrestling. Former sports included co-ed cheerleading. Men's volleyball will be added in 2024–25.

== Notable alumni ==
- Joe Aull
- Ewald W. Busse
- W. Bruce Cameron, author
- Courtney W. Campbell
- Wallace H. Coulter
- William Henry Danforth, academic and philanthropist
- Forrest DeBernardi
- Bill Emerson
- G. David Gearhart
- Michael Gibbons, former President Pro Tem of Missouri State Senate
- James Gladstone, football executive
- Julian Wood Glass Jr., United States District Judge of the United States District Court for the Eastern District of Missouri
- George F. Gunn Jr.
- Paul K. Holmes III
- Henry Iba, basketball coach and college athletics administrator
- Michael Kim
- Ian Mackey, class of 2009, member of the Missouri General Assembly
- Bake McBride from Fulton, NL Rookie of the Year 1974
- Edward Howard Payne, namesake of Howard Payne University
- Edward D. Robertson Jr.
- Tony F. Schneider
- Scott Shipp was the second superintendent of the Virginia Military Institute and a Confederate officer
- Alfred C. Sikes, former U.S. administrator of the National Telecommunications and Information Administration, who served as chairman of the Federal Communications Commission (FCC)
- Scott Pingel
- Forrest Smith
- Thomas Starzl
- Howard Sutherland
- John Van Sant, politician
- Harry Vaughan, U.S. Army Reserve general who served as Aide to the President of the United States from 1945 to 1953
- Oberon Zell-Ravenheart
