= James Calvert (divine) =

English Nonconformist minister (bap. 1631, d. 1698)

James Calvert (bapt. 1631 – 1698) was an English Nonconformist divine.

== Life ==
James Calvert was baptised at Allhallows Pavement, York, on 23 May 1631, the eldest son of Robert Calvert, a grocer and sheriff of York. He was educated at St Peter's School, York and Clare Hall, Cambridge. He had been for several years at Topcliffe when he was silenced by the Act of Uniformity; after which he retired to York, and lived privately, but studied diligently. As a result of his studies, he brought out his work, entitled Naphthali, seu Collectatio Theologica, de Reditu Decem Tribuum, Conversione, et Mensibus Ezekielis (1672). About 1675 he became chaplain to Sir William Strickland, and, afterwards, to Sir William Middleton and tutor to his son. He died in December 1698.

== See also ==
- Thomas Calvert (divine)
- Great Ejection

== Sources ==
- Burns, William E. (2004). "Calvert, James (bap. 1631, d. 1698), nonconformist minister". Oxford Dictionary of National Biography. Oxford University Press. Retrieved 14 August 2022.

Attribution:
