= Matthew Newcomen =

English minister (d. 1669)

Matthew Newcomen (c. 1610 – 1 September 1669) was an English nonconformist churchman.

His exact date of birth is unknown. He was educated at St John's College, Cambridge (M.A. 1633). In 1636 he became lecturer at Dedham in Essex, and led the church reform party in that county. He assisted Edmund Calamy the Elder in writing Smectymnuus (1641), and preached before parliament in 1643. He was multi-talented, excelling in preaching and debate, and was offered several lucrative positions.

He protested against the extreme democratic proposals called The Agreement of the People (1647), and was one of the commissioners at the Savoy Synod of 1658. When the Act of Uniformity was passed in 1662, Newcomen lost his living, but was soon invited to the pastorate at Leiden, where he was held in high esteem not only by his own people but by the university professors. He died of plague in 1669.

== Publications ==
His writings included;

- God, the Best Acquaintance of Christians
- The All-Seeing Unseen Eye of God
