= Edward Barber (minister) =

English Londoner minister

Edward Barber (died 1674?) was an English General Baptist minister in London.

== Life ==
Before allying with the Baptists, Edward Barber was an ordained priest of the Church of England. Long before the beginning of the Civil War, Barber became convinced of baptizing believers only and professed himself in accordance with the Baptist cause in England.

Barber was chosen minister of the Bishopsgate Street church, in Spitalfields, London, where many Londoners attended the services. The church appear to have been the first English Nonconformist church of Baptist beliefs to practice laying on of hands on baptizands at their reception into the church (Confirmation). The custom was introduced about 1646 by the Welsh Baptist Francis Cornwell.

Previously to the year 1641, Barber was kept eleven months in Newgate Prison for denying the baptism of infants and that payment of tithes to the Anglican clergy was God's ordinance under the Gospel. Barber preached in season and out of season. In 1648, Barber preached in the parish church of St. Benet Fink about baptism. He defended and taught believers baptism in opposition of infants baptism, where a turmoil happened due to the non acceptance of the practice, and he himself left an account.

== Death ==
The date of Edward Barber's death is unknown, however, in 1674, Jonathan Jennings succeeded Barber in the leadership of the Bishopsgate church, suggesting he might have died.

== Works ==
Edward Barber is the author of:

- 1. 'To the King's most Excellent Maiesty, and the Honourable Court of Parliament. The humble Petition of many his Maiesties loyall and faithfull subjects, some of which having beene miserably persecuted by the Prelates and their Adherents, by all rigorous courses, for their Consciences, practising nothing but what was instituted by the Lord Jesus Christ,’ &c., London, 1641, s. sh. fol. This petition, which prays for liberty of worship for the baptists, is signed 'Edward Barber, sometimes Prisoner in Newgate for the Gospel of Christ.'
- 2. 'A small Treatise of Baptisme, or, Dipping, wherein is cleerely shewed that the Lord Christ ordained Dipping for those only that profess repentance and faith. (1) Proved by Scriptures; (2) By Arguments; (3) A parallel betwixt circumcision and dipping; (4) An answer to some objections by P[raisegod] B[arebone],’ London, 1641, 4to.
- 3. 'A declaration and vindication of the carriage of Edward Barber, at the parish meeting house of Benetfinck, London, Fryday the 14 of Iuly 1648, after the morning exercise of Mr. Callamy was ended, wherein the pride of the Ministers, and Babylonish or confused carriage of the hearers is laid down,’ London, 1648, 4to.
- 4. 'An Answer to the Essex Watchmens Watchword, being 63 of them in number. Or a discovery of their Ignorance, in denying liberty to tender consciences in religious worship, to be granted alike to all,’ London, 1649, 4to.
