= St Mary Aldermanbury =

Former London church, rebuilt in the United States

Coordinates: 51°30′59.34″N 0°5′35.06″W

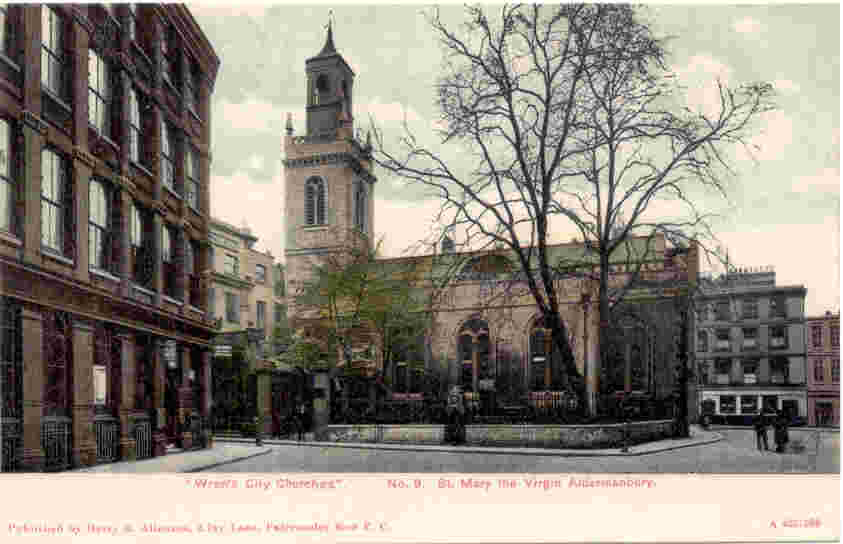
- St Mary Aldermanbury in 1904
- St Mary Aldermanbury
- Location: Love Lane and Aldermanbury, City of London
- Country: England
- Denomination: Anglican

History
- Founded: 12th century

Architecture
- Functional status: Removed and reconstructed at National Churchill Museum, Westminster College, Fulton, Missouri, USA
- Heritage designation: Grade II listed building (site)
- Designated: 5 June 1972
- Architect: Christopher Wren
- Closed: 29 December 1940
- Demolished: 1966

Specifications
- Materials: Portland stone

Administration
- Diocese: Diocese of London

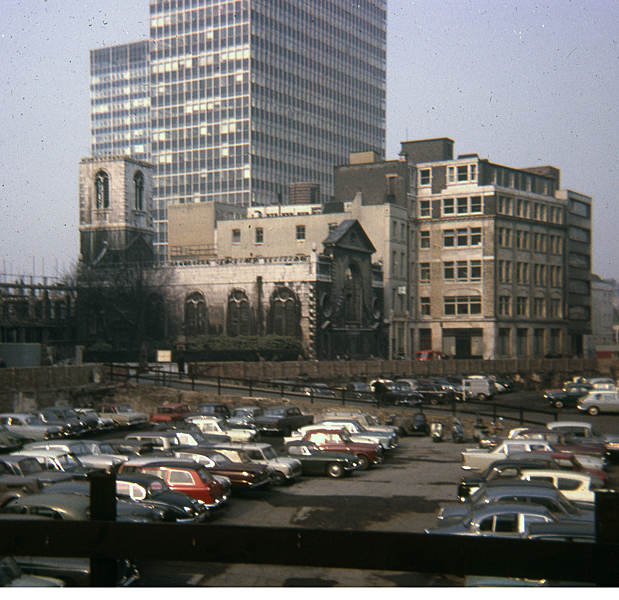
The blitzed church in situ in London, 1964

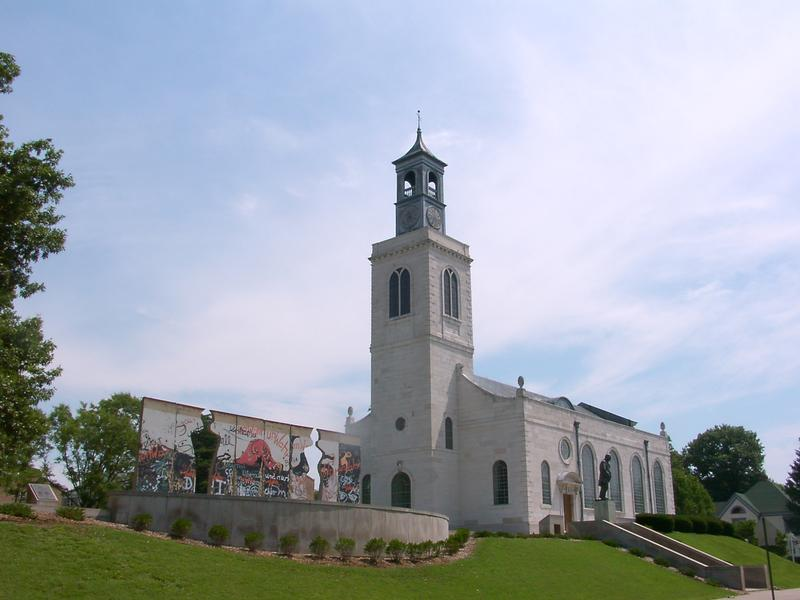
The rebuilt church and Breakthrough sculpture at Westminster College in Fulton, Missouri, 2006

St Mary, the Virgin, Aldermanbury is a former parish and church in the City of London first mentioned in the 12th century and destroyed by the Great Fire of London in 1666. Rebuilt like many other City of London churches by Christopher Wren, it was again gutted by the Blitz in 1940, leaving only the walls standing. These stones were transported in 1966 to Fulton, Missouri, where they were rebuilt in the grounds of Westminster College and form part of the National Churchill Museum. The site in London near the Guildhall is marked by a garden.

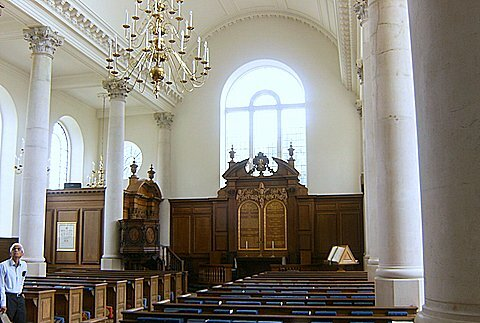
Inside the rebuilt church

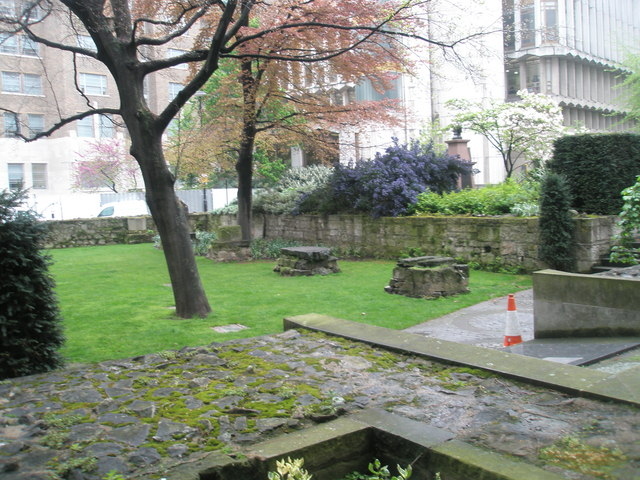
Park on the former site of the church in London

== History ==
St Mary, the Virgin, Aldermanbury was established in the early 12th century and first mentioned in 1181. The church was destroyed in the Great Fire of London in 1666 and was rebuilt in Portland stone by Christopher Wren.

In the 1830s, the notable missionary William Jowett was a lecturer at the church.

On 29 December 1940, during the Blitz, the church was again destroyed by fire, together with seven other City of London churches. The gutted walls were left in place for lack of restoration funds after the war.

On 5 March 1946, Winston Churchill made his "Sinews of Peace" speech in the gymnasium at Westminster College in Missouri, coining the term "Iron Curtain." In spring 1961, discussions about how to commemorate the event led to a proposal to rebuild St Mary Aldermanbury on the college campus. Approval was granted by the City of London and the Diocese of London, and the necessary $1.5 million was raised with first President Kennedy and then President Johnson serving as honorary project chairman, and former presidents Eisenhower and Truman lending support. In 1965, the remains of the church were dismantled and approximately 7,000 stones numbered and transported by ship and rail to Fulton, where the building was reconstructed under the direction of architect Patrick Horsbrugh. The chief mason, Eris Lytle, said he needed to learn Renaissance craft techniques for the project.

The church was rededicated on 7 May 1969 and was restored in the 2020s. It is now part of the National Churchill Museum at Westminster College. Edwina Sandys' sculpture Breakthrough is next to the church.

The footprint of the church, with some stones, remains at the junction of Aldermanbury and Love Lanes in the City of London, adjacent to the Guildhall. It is planted as a park, with a large stone marking the former site of the altar, and was refurbished in 2024 with assistance from Westminster College. There is a memorial plaque placed by the college, and also a monument topped by a bust of Shakespeare to Henry Condell and John Heminges, key figures in the production of the First Folio of his plays and partners with him in the Globe Theatre; both lived in the parish and were buried in its churchyard. The site was designated a Grade II listed building on 5 June 1972; the monuments are separately listed.

== Burials ==
Notable burials in the church included the notorious "hanging judge" Judge Jeffreys. Of the interment of Judge Jeffreys, Leigh Hunt wrote:

Jeffreys was taken on the twelfth of September, 1688. He was first interred privately in the Tower; but three years afterwards, when his memory was something blown over, his friends obtained permission, by a warrant of the queen's dated September 1692, to take his remains under their own care, and he was accordingly reinterred in a vault under the communion table of St. Mary, Aldermanbury, 2nd Nov. 1694. In 1810, during certain repairs, the coffin was uncovered for a time, and the public had a sight of the box containing the mortal remains of the feared and hated magistrate.

Also buried in the church were:

- Edmund Calamy, Presbyterian minister, who was the perpetual curate of St Mary Aldermanbury 1639–1662.
- Edmund Calamy the Younger, a preacher removed by the Great Ejection
- Edmund Calamy III, historian and Presbyterian minister
- Edmund Calamy IV, his son, dissenting minister
- Henry Condell, actor, member of the King's Men
- William Damsell, Receiver-General of the Court of Wards and Liveries and a Member of Parliament
- Thomas Digges, astronomer who is believed to have been the first person to postulate in print that the universe is infinite
- John Heminges, actor, member of the King's Men
- James Janeway, Puritan author and minister

== Marriage ==
- In 1656 the poet John Milton married his second wife, Elizabeth Woodcock, at St Mary's.

== See also ==
- List of demolished buildings and structures in London
- List of Christopher Wren churches in London
