= Tony F. Schneider =

Professor of Naval Science and WW2 U.S. Navy vereran

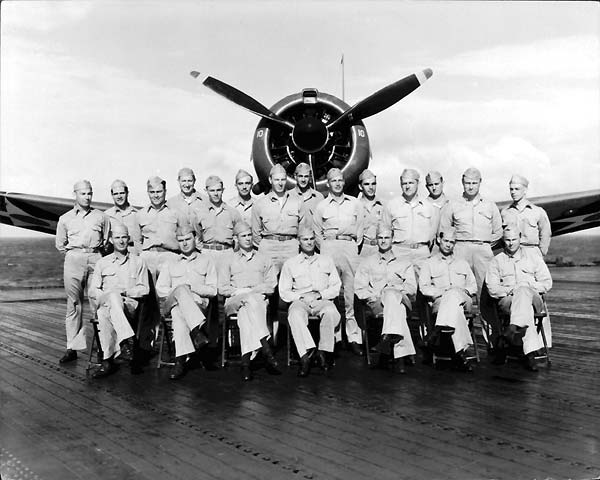
- Tony Schneider is 3rd from the left in the second row in this January, 1942, photo of the pilots of Bombing Squadron 6 aboard USS Enterprise (CV-6)
- Born: November 11, 1917; Hillsboro, Missouri, U.S.
- Died: October 16, 2010 (aged 92); Albuquerque, New Mexico, U.S.
- Military career
- Allegiance: United States of America
- Branch: United States Navy
- Service years: 1940–1970
- Rank: Captain
- Commands: Bombing Squadron 9 NROTC Unit, University of New Mexico; Naval Air Station Cubi Point
- Conflicts: World War II: Marshalls-Gilberts raids; Battle of Midway; Guadalcanal Campaign; Battle of Iwo Jima; Battle of Okinawa; Operation Ten-Go
- Awards: Navy Cross (2); Legion of Merit; Distinguished Flying Cross (3); Air Medal (6); Presidential Unit Citation (3); Joint Service Commendation Medal

Tony F. Schneider (November 11, 1917 – October 16, 2010) was an American World War II pilot who taught at University of Louisville and was appointed the Holloway Plan Professor of Naval Science at the University of New Mexico.

== Bombing Squadron 6 ==
Schneider completed naval flight training following graduation from Westminster College (Missouri) with a mathematics degree in 1939. He was commissioned as an ensign in United States Naval Reserve in 1940 assigned to Bombing Squadron 6 aboard Enterprise. He launched from Enterprise on December 7, 1941, in an unsuccessful attempt to locate the Japanese fleet following the attack on Pearl Harbor. He flew from Enterprise for the Marshalls-Gilberts raids in February, 1942, and while Enterprise accompanied USS Hornet (CV-8) for the Doolittle Raid in April. His Air Medal citation for the February raids reads: "Attacked enemy ships and shore installations in face of heavy anti-aircraft fire destroying large storehouse and damaging two bombers on ground with near misses." He flew with C. Wade McClusky's SBD Dauntless dive bombers during the Battle of Midway, but a throttle malfunction caused his plane to run out of fuel as the dive bomber formation searched for the Japanese aircraft carriers. He spent three days in the Pacific on a small inflatable life raft after rescuing his unconscious tail gunner from the sinking aircraft, before being rescued by a VP-23 PBY Catalina on June 6. Prior to his rescue he had to shoot two Great White sharks amidst a sizable school of sharks swimming alongside and only inches from the raft, so as to repel the sharks from damaging the raft. He received his first Navy Cross for this action.

== Western Pacific ==
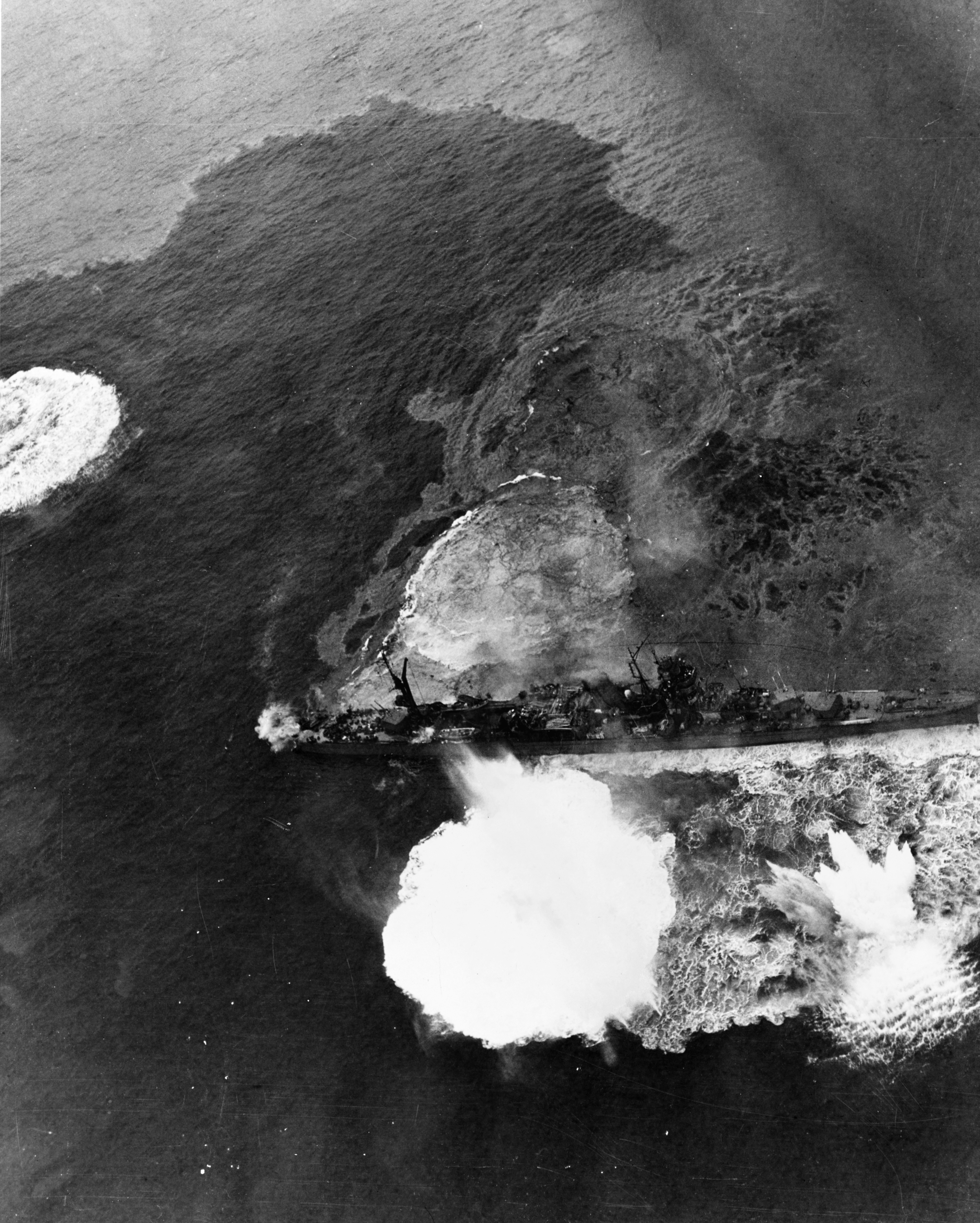
Japanese light cruiser Yahagi under attack by dive bombers during Operation Ten-Go.

Schneider became operations officer of Scouting Squadron 11, and earned his first Distinguished Flying Cross leading air strikes out of Henderson Field (Guadalcanal) for three months before returning to the United States to spend a year instructing bomber pilots in Seattle. He then became commanding officer of Bombing Squadron 9 and finished the war flying from USS Lexington (CV-16) and USS Yorktown (CV-10). He received a second Distinguished Flying Cross leading a successful air strike against an aircraft assembly plant near Tokyo, a third Distinguished Flying Cross leading close air support missions during the invasions of Iwo Jima and Okinawa, and a second Navy Cross leading Bombing Squadron 9 against Yahagi during Operation Ten-Go.

Bombing Squadron 9 took off from Yorktown and approached Yahagi through the clouds to avoid flak. A three-plane section dived early and missed. The remaining ten Curtiss SB2C Helldivers followed Schneider into position for a fore-and-aft no-flaps glide run. Eight of the twenty 1,000-pound (450 kg) bombs released from a 45° glide scored direct hits. Yahagi was enveloped in smoke and made a half roll as she plunged beneath the surface.

== Post-war service ==
After the war, Schneider served in Florida with the advanced training command at Naval Air Station Jacksonville and as tactics development officer for an anti-submarine warfare (ASW) development squadron in Key West. He worked at the Pentagon from 1951 to 1953 writing tactical publications for ASW and all weather operations. He subsequently served as operations officer and executive officer of the fleet all-weather training unit flying jet night fighters with the Aerospace Defense Command of the United States west coast. He served as executive officer of the Naval Reserve Officers Training Corps (NROTC) at the University of Louisville before returning to sea as executive officer of USS Bon Homme Richard (CV-31). He then attended the Naval War College before serving as naval assistant to the North American Aerospace Defense Command (NORAD) from 1962 to 1965 and commanding the NROTC unit at the University of New Mexico from 1965 to 1968. He served as Deputy Commander FleetAir Western Pacific at the Naval Air Station Cubi Point for one year from 1968 to 1969, and then his final year was traveling the world as Inspector General, before retiring from active duty in 1970.

== Final years ==
Schneider retired to Albuquerque, New Mexico, where he spent the last decade of his life caring for his wife of 67 years, Jean Ross Schneider, before dying of a stroke at the age of 92.
