= National Churchill Museum =

- Winston Churchill Memorial
- U.S. National Register of Historic Places
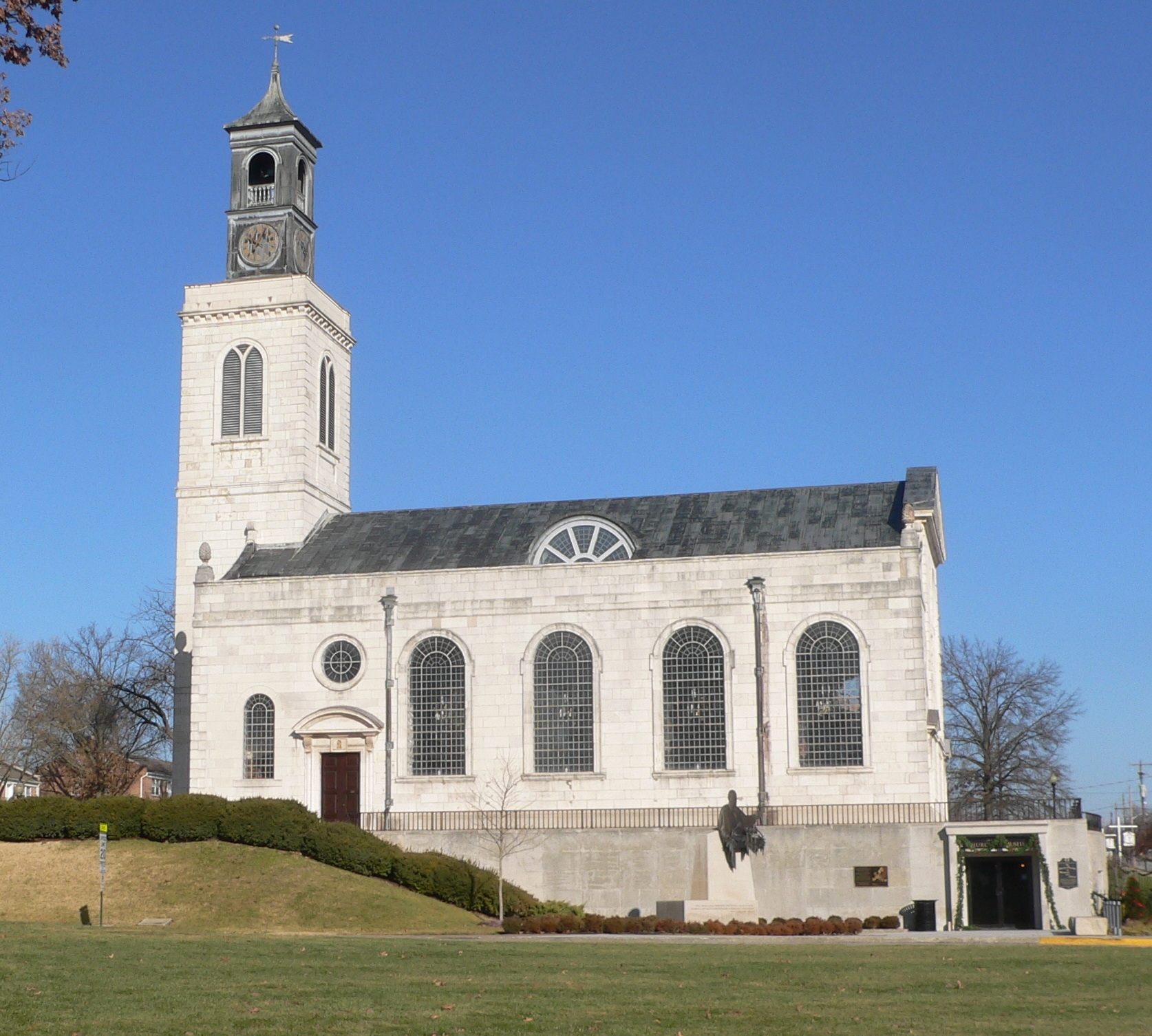
- View from the south

- Location within Missouri
- Location: Fulton, Missouri
- Coordinates: 38°50′59.93″N 91°57′16.34″W
- Built: 1677
- Architect: Christopher Wren
- Architectural style: Renaissance Classical, English Baroque
- NRHP reference No.: 72000708
- Added to NRHP: March 16, 1972

America’s National Churchill Museum (formerly the Winston Churchill Memorial and Library in the United States) is located on the Westminster College campus in Fulton, Missouri, United States. The museum commemorates Sir Winston Churchill, the former Prime Minister of the United Kingdom, and comprises three elements: the Church of St Mary, the Virgin, Aldermanbury, the museum below the church, and the adjacent Breakthrough sculpture.

== Overview ==
The central element of America’s National Churchill Museum is the Church of St. Mary, the Virgin, Aldermanbury, a 17th-century church moved stone-by-stone to Fulton from its former location in London, England.

Beneath the church is the Churchill museum, renovated in 2006. Its exhibits tell Churchill's story, discussing his personal and political life and his legacy. Additionally, the Clementine Spencer-Churchill Reading Room houses an extensive research collection about Churchill.

Outside the church stands the Breakthrough sculpture, formed from eight sections of the Berlin Wall. Churchill's granddaughter, artist Edwina Sandys, designed the sculpture to commemorate both the "Sinews of Peace" speech and the fall of the Berlin Wall.

== "The Sinews of Peace" address ==
In 1946, the president of Westminster College, Franc McCluer, reached out to a member of United States President Harry S Truman's administration, Major General Harry H. Vaughan, a Westminster College alumnus. He arranged for Truman to visit the college, and to invite Winston Churchill to speak there. Churchill accepted the invitation, and on March 5, 1946, delivered his famous "Sinews of Peace" address, also known as the "Iron Curtain" speech, as a part of the John Findley Green Foundation Lecture series. Truman introduced him.

Today, visitors to the museum may view filmed selections of the speech. The lectern and chair that Churchill used are on display in the museum.

== Churchill's Living Memorial: St. Mary, the Virgin, Aldermanbury ==
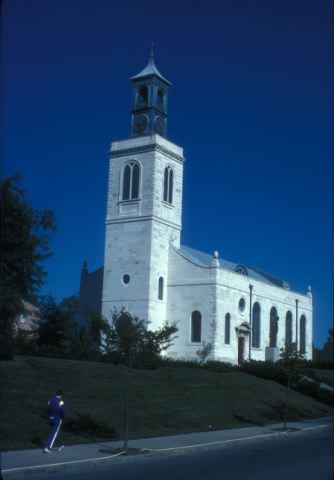
St. Mary, Aldermanbury as rebuilt

In 1961, Westminster College President Dr. Robert L. D. Davidson began formulating a plan to commemorate both Winston Churchill's life and the "Sinews of Peace." A LIFE magazine feature on war-ravaged, soon-to-be-demolished Christopher Wren churches in London prompted the suggestion to import one of the churches to serve as both a memorial and the College chapel. After further investigation, college officials selected St. Mary, Aldermanbury as the church to be relocated to the college.

St. Mary, Aldermanbury was chosen because of its relatively small size and its nearly 1,000-year history. Founded in the late 12th century, the church survived the English Reformation, English Restoration, and numerous civil wars. However, on September 2, 1666, the church was destroyed in the Great Fire of London. With approval for rebuilding granted in 1670, architect Christopher Wren began renovating the church in 1672. He rebuilt the church on part of the old foundation with as many of the original stones as could be salvaged. By 1677, the work was essentially complete; the cupola was added to the tower in 1679.

On December 29,1940, during World War II, the German Luftwaffe mounted a massive air raid and St. Mary's suffered a direct hit by an incendiary bomb, causing it to burn down. In the aftermath of the war, few of the destroyed churches were rebuilt, and many, St. Mary's included, remained as ruins. After standing as ruins for 20 years, St. Mary's and several other of London's parish churches were slated for demolition.

At this point, Westminster College stepped in to stop the demolition of St. Mary's and decided to reconstruct it in honor of Winston Churchill. It took four years to finalize preparations for the project and to raise enough of the necessary $2 million (more than $10 million today) to carry out the transportation and reconstruction.

In 1965, the removal process of St. Mary's began. Workers labeled each of the 7,000 stones, noting their location in the church. More than 700 tons of blocks were shipped to Fulton via boat and rail. In the transportation process, the stones got out of order, complicating the reconstruction of the church.

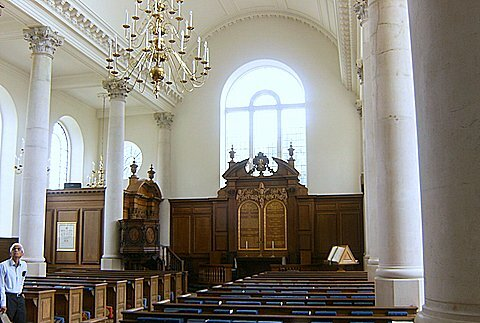
Interior of St. Mary Aldermanbury Church

The foundation stone was laid in October 1966, and by May 1967, the last stone was in place. However, the project required another two years of work to finish reconstructing the interior. English woodcarvers, working from pre-war photographs, created carvings for the pulpit, baptismal font, and balcony. Blenko Glass Company, an American firm, manufactured the glass for the windows, and a Dutch firm cast five new bronze bells for the tower. Noel Mander, the fire warden who watched St. Mary's burn in 1940, built the organ and helped assure authenticity of the interior details. There were two departures from the Wren design: an organ gallery in the west wall, and a window in the tower to illuminate the stairway.

Dedication ceremonies for St. Mary's and the Winston Churchill Memorial and Library were held on May 7, 1969. During the course of the ceremonies, the Rev. Anthony Tremlett, the Bishop of Dover, England, re-hallowed St. Mary's as a place of worship. In 1992, the Eagle Squadrons Association named St. Mary's as its official chapel. In 2009 the US House of Representatives passed H.Res. 390, declaring the Winston Churchill Memorial and Library as “America’s National Churchill Museum." On March 6, 2025, Rep. Robert Onder introduced H.R. 1945, America's National Historic Landmark Act, and Sen. Josh Hawley introduced S. 650, the companion bill in the Senate. The bill was signed into law on November 10, 2026, officially designating the site as "America's National Churchill Museum National Historic Landmark."

== Winston S. Churchill: A Life of Leadership gallery ==
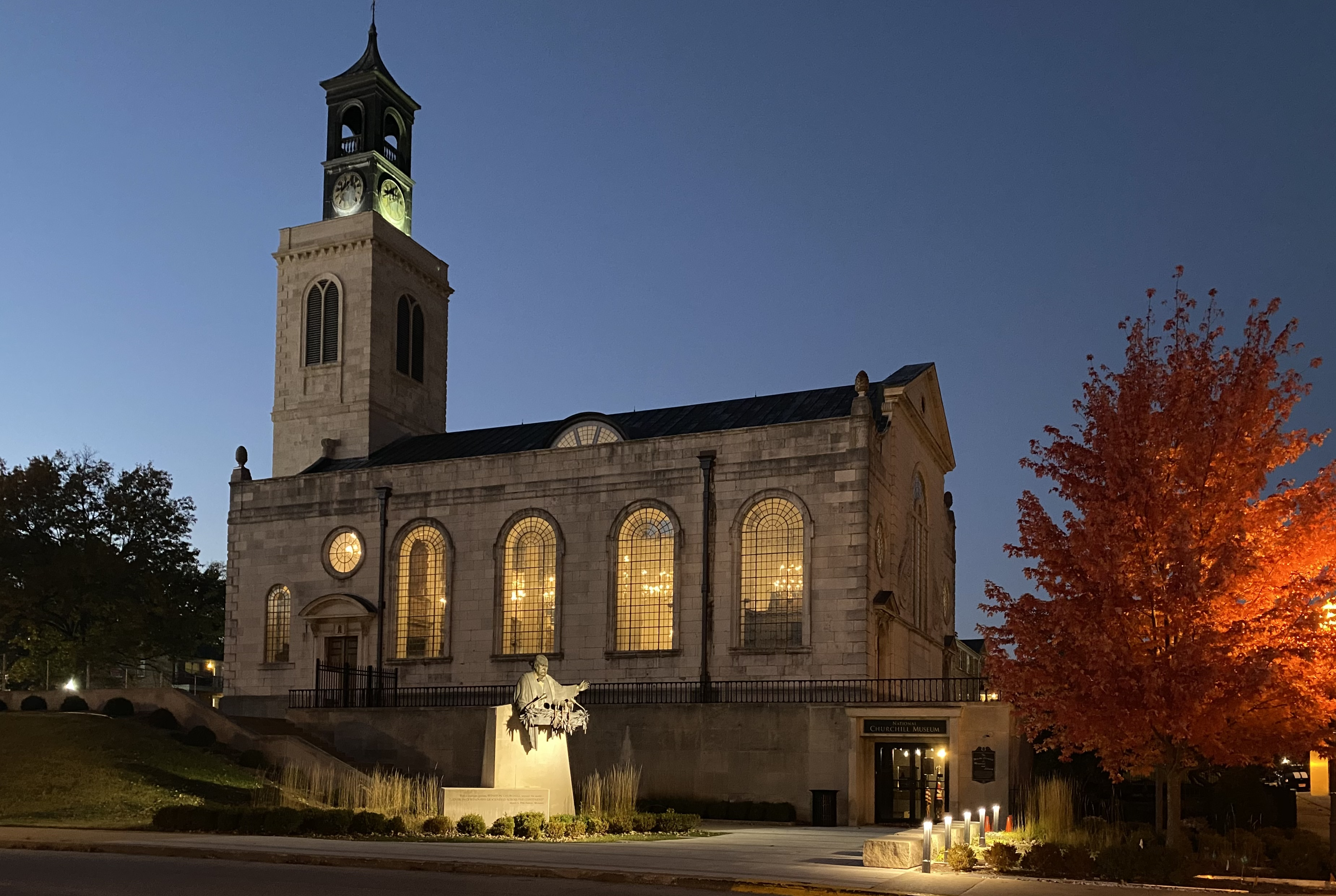
Sir Christopher Wren’s Church of St Mary, Aldermanbury at America’s National Churchill Museum on the campus of Westminster College in Fulton, Missouri.

The museum presents the narrative of Churchill's life. The exhibition begins with Churchill's birth and proceeds through the major events of his life, alongside an examination of the critical events of the 20th century.

One of the focal points of the gallery is the "Admiralty, Army & Arsenal: 1914–1919" room. This portion of the exhibit is housed within a recreation of a World War I trench—complete with barbed wire, sandbags, and spent ammunition—that gives visitors a sense of a British soldier's experience on the Western Front. A periscope mounted on the trench wall gives visitors a glimpse of a real World War I battlescape from period footage. An accompanying audio track plays the sound of soldiers' conversations interspersed with distant gunfire and shell bursts. The World War I room also examines Churchill's role in the disasters of the Dardanelles and Gallipoli and his contributions to the technology of warfare.

Another component of the exhibition is "The Gathering Storm: 1929–1939" room which discusses Churchill's suspicion of Hitler and the Nazi movement. In this room, five video monitors play excerpts from Nazi propaganda films interspersed with images of the impending war. Against this backdrop, the exhibit examines Churchill's view of the Nazis and his disgust for Britain's pre-war appeasement politics.

Another room, "Churchill's Finest Hour: World War II, 1939–1945", portrays World War II and Churchill's role. It contains a sound and light show that replicates an air-raid on London during the "Blitz". It includes simulated rubble, the sounds of bombs detonating and air raid sirens, flashing lights that represent searchlights and anti-aircraft fire, as well as audio clips of war-time broadcasts. After the conclusion of the Blitz demonstration, a short film, narrated by Walter Cronkite, examines Churchill's role as prime minister during the war. More interactive displays describe the war-time skills of code breaking and plane spotting.

Other museum components include "The Sinews of Peace" room and the "Winston's Wit & Wisdom" room. "The Sinews of Peace" tells the story of how and why Churchill came to visit Westminster College. Featured in this exhibit are the lectern and chair used by Churchill during his speech and the ceremonial robes he wore. In "Winston's Wit & Wisdom" visitors sit in a simulated British club while listening to an audio presentation of Churchill stories. Visitors to this room may also search through a database of Churchill's most famous quotations and quips on a host of topics.

== Breakthrough ==
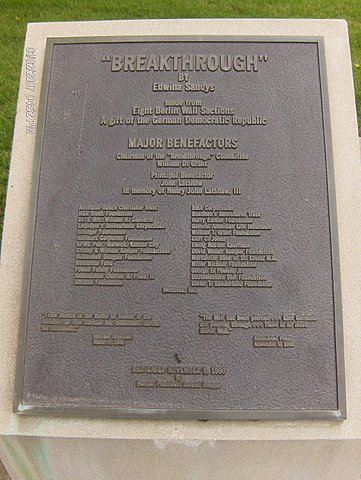
The Breakthrough Statue Plaque

On November 9, 1990, Edwina Sandys, granddaughter of Winston Churchill, introduced her sculpture Breakthrough to the public at America’s National Churchill Museum. Made from eight sections of the Berlin Wall, Breakthrough serves to commemorate the fall of the Berlin Wall, and to memorialize Churchill's "Sinews of Peace."

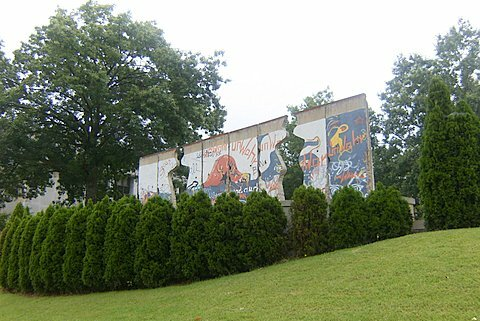
Rebuilt section of the Berlin wall

In 1990, with the support of Westminster College, Sandys and her husband, Richard Kaplan, traveled to East Berlin to secure portions of the wall. Upon their arrival in Berlin, however, the couple realized the sculpture would be costly, as 4-foot (1.2 m)-wide sections were selling for $60,000 to $200,000. However, East German officials, intrigued by the idea of erecting a Berlin Wall monument at the location of Churchill's 1946 speech, allowed Sandys to choose eight sections of the wall as a gift to Westminster College.

Sandys chose the sections from an area near the Brandenburg Gate, frequented by artists, because of the dramatic color of the graffiti. The repeated use of the word "unwahr" ("lies" or "untruths") within the sections also appealed to her. Sandys modified the original sections by cutting out large male and female silhouettes from the wall—which symbolized the newly-opened communication between East and West Germany. When assembled, Breakthrough stood roughly 11 ft (3.4 m) high by 32 ft (9.8 m) ft long. The silhouette cut-outs are part of a second sculpture entitled Breakfree, located at the Franklin D. Roosevelt Presidential Library and Museum in Hyde Park, New York.

One year after the fall of the Berlin Wall, Sandys unveiled Breakthrough before a crowd of 7,000 people gathered on the campus of Westminster College.

== The Green Foundation & Kemper Lecture Series ==
The John Findley Green Foundation Lectures were established in 1936 as a memorial to John Findley Green, an attorney in St. Louis who graduated from Westminster College in 1884. The foundation provides for lectures designed to promote understanding of economic and social problems of international concern. The Crosby Kemper Lecture Series was established in 1979 by a grant from the Crosby Kemper Foundation of Kansas City, Missouri. This foundation provides for lectures by authorities on British History and Sir Winston Churchill at America’s National Churchill Museum.
