= Stephen Marshall (minister) =

English Nonconformist churchman (d. 1655)

Stephen Marshall (c. 1594 – 1655) was an English Nonconformist churchman. His sermons, especially that on the death of John Pym in 1643, reveal eloquence and fervour. The only "systematic" work he published was A Defence of Infant Baptism, against John Tombes (1646).

== Early life ==
He was born at Godmanchester in Huntingdonshire, and was educated at Emmanuel College, Cambridge (M.A. 1622, B.D. 1629). After holding the living of Wethersfield in Essex, he became vicar of Finchingfield. In 1636 he was reported for "want of conformity."

== Civil War years ==
Marshall was a powerful preacher: Robert Baillie noted that he was reckoned the best in England. He also influenced the elections for the Short Parliament of 1640: Edward Hyde, 1st Earl of Clarendon considered his influence on the parliamentary side to be greater than that of William Laud on the royalist. In 1642 Marshall was appointed lecturer at St Margaret's, Westminster, and delivered a series of addresses to the Commons in which he advocated episcopal and liturgical reform.

He had a share in writing Smectymnuus, was appointed chaplain to the Earl of Essex's regiment in 1642, and a member of the Westminster Assembly in 1643. He represented the English Parliament in Scotland in 1643, and attended the parliamentary commissions at the Uxbridge Conference in 1645. He was with Archbishop Laud before the latter's execution, and was chaplain to King Charles I at Holmby House and at Carisbrooke Castle.

== Later life ==
A moderate Presbyterian, he contributed to the Westminster Shorter Catechism in 1647, and was one of the "Triers" in 1654. He died in November 1655 and was buried in Westminster Abbey, but his body was exhumed and maltreated at the Restoration.

== Works ==
- A defence of infant-baptism in answer to two treatises

He worked as a contributor on:

- Smectymnuus (contributor)
- Shorter Catechism (contributor)

=== Sermons ===
- A sermon Preached before the Honourable House of Commons, now assembled in Parliament, at their publike Fast, 17 November 1640. Upon 2 Chron. 15. 2 (1641)
- The Song of Moses, the Servant of God, and the Song of the Lamb(1643)
- A sacred panegyrick, or, A sermon of thanksgiving, preached to the two Houses of Parliament....18 January 1643 (1644)
- On the death of John Pym [?] (1643)
