= Edmund Calamy the Elder =

English Presbyterian leader (1600–1666)

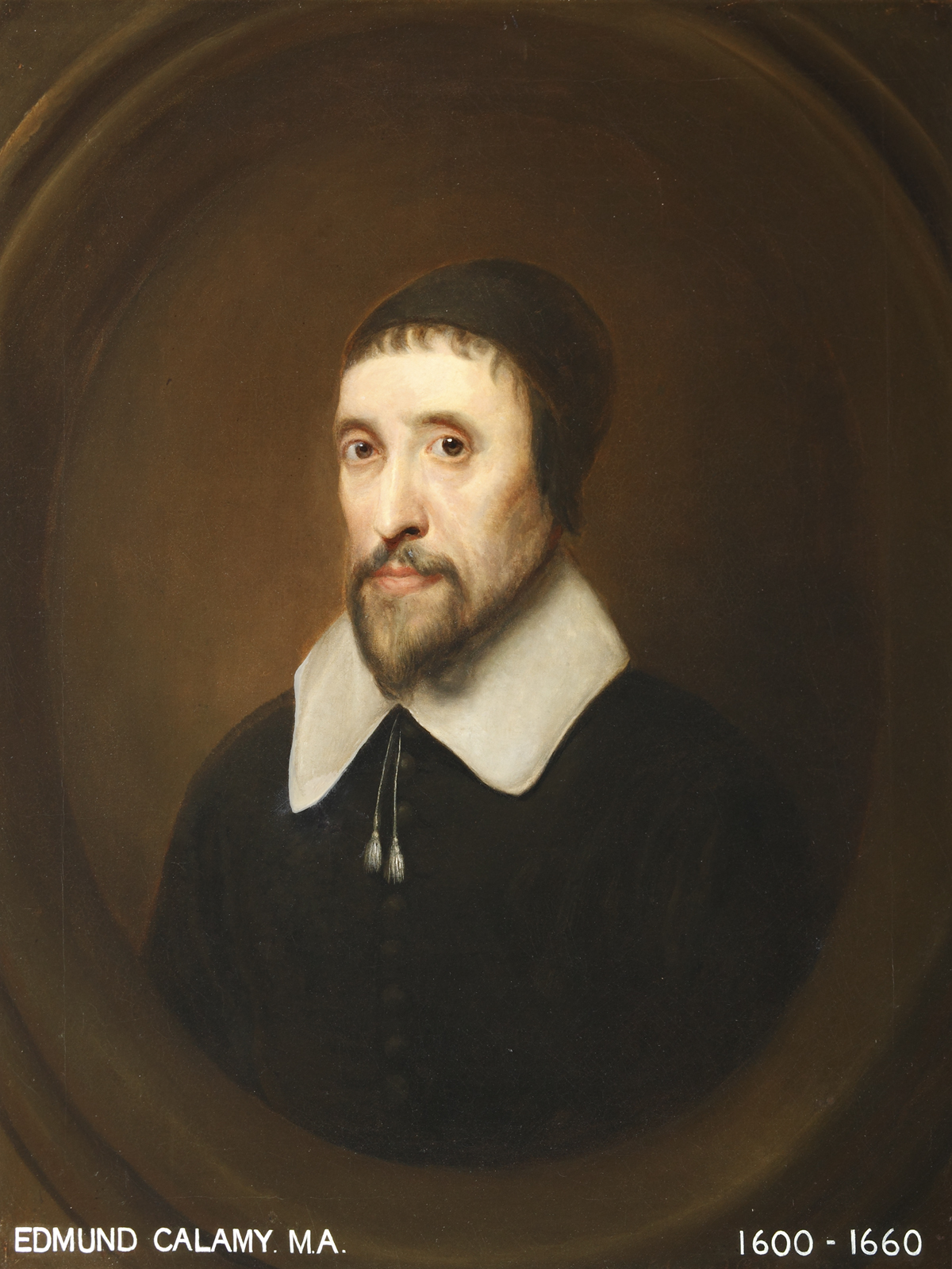
Edmund Calamy

Edmund Calamy (February 1600 – 29 October 1666) was an English Presbyterian church leader and divine. Known as "the elder", he was the first of four generations of nonconformist ministers bearing the same name.

== Early life ==
The Calamy family claimed to be of Huguenot descent. Edmund Calamy was born in the parish of St Thomas the Apostle, London, and educated at Merchant Taylors' School and then Pembroke College, Cambridge, where his opposition to Arminianism excluded him from a fellowship. Nicholas Felton, Bishop of Ely, nevertheless made him his chaplain, and gave him the living of St Mary, Swaffham Prior in East Cambridgeshire, which he held till 1626.

He then moved to Bury St Edmunds, where he lectured for ten years; the later Congregationalist Jeremiah Burroughs was another preacher in the town. He retired when his bishop Matthew Wren insisted on the observance of certain ceremonial articles: Calamy refused to read out the Book of Sports in his church. In 1636 he was appointed rector (or perhaps only lecturer) of Rochford in Essex, but had to leave for the sake of his health. In 1639 he was elected to the perpetual curacy of St Mary Aldermanbury in London, where he had a large following.

== Presbyterian activist ==
At the opening of the Long Parliament he distinguished himself in defence of the Presbyterian polity, in contributing to the joint conciliatory work known as Smectymnuus. It argued against Bishop Joseph Hall's presentation of episcopacy, while articulating the Presbyterian positions. The initials of the names of the contributors formed the name under which it was published, viz., Stephen Marshall (SM), Edmund Calamy (EC), Thomas Young (TY), Matthew Newcomen (MN), and William Spurstow (WS, then often written VVS equivalent to UUS). These were clerical leaders of the Presbyterian movement within the Church of England. At the same period Calamy was an influential evangelical preacher, calling in December 1641 for a preaching ministry throughout England.

Calamy was an active member in the Westminster Assembly of divines, set up in 1643. In that year he edited the Souldier's Pocket Bible, a popular Biblical anthology designed for the Parliamentarian military forces.

The Smectymnuans were against religious tolerance and Calamy strongly advocated checking independent religious thinkers in 1644, attracting allies such as Lazarus Seaman. Refusing to advance to Congregationalism, he found within Presbyterianism a middle course which best suited his views of theology and church government. Calamy belonged to the hypothetical universalist group in the Assembly, those influenced by John Davenant or his reading of the Synod of Dort. Richard Baxter reported that Calamy, Lazarus, Richard Vines and John Arrowsmith were not hostile to universal redemption.

In 1647 he worked on the Assembly's Catechism. In 1648 he was preaching at St Benet Fink, to find an adversarial atmosphere in which the Baptist Edward Barber had been invited to contradict him.

He opposed the execution of King Charles I, and lived quietly under the Commonwealth. Asked for advice by Oliver Cromwell on the dissolution of the Rump Parliament and the establishment of a Protectorate, he replied that nine out of ten would oppose it.

== After the Restoration ==
He was assiduous in promoting the return of Charles II of England, travelling to the Netherlands as one of the negotiators. After the Restoration in 1660 he was offered the bishopric of Coventry and Lichfield, but declined it. Presbyterians had warned him that his reputation and honour would suffer if he accepted, and he tried to co-ordinate a refusal with Richard Baxter, in the same position.

He was made one of Charles's chaplains, and vainly tried to secure the legal ratification of Charles's declaration of 25 October 1660. He was ejected for Nonconformity in the Great Ejection of 1662, and was so affected by the sight of the devastation caused by the Great Fire of London that he died shortly afterwards. He was buried in the ruins of his church, near the place where the pulpit had stood.

== Works ==
His publications are almost entirely sermons.

- The Art of Divine Meditation (London: for Tho. Parkhurst, 1634) – not sermons.
- An Answer to a Book entitled, An Humble Remonstrance (1641) as a member of Smectymnuus
- Gods Free Mercy to England (1642)
- Englands Looking-glasse (1642)
- Souldier's Pocket Bible (1643), editor (1895 reprint)
- Jus Divinum Ministerii Evangelici (1654)
- The Godly Man's Ark (1658)

== Calamy the Younger ==
His eldest son was also called Edmund Calamy, known as "the Younger"; Calamy the Younger followed a religious path similar to his father's, and he lost the rectory of Moreton, Essex in the Great Ejection of 1662. He was of a retiring disposition and moderate views, and died in 1685. He was the father of the historian Edmund Calamy.
