= Edmund Calamy the Younger =

English clergyman and ejected minister

Edmund Calamy the Younger (c. 1635–1685) was an English ejected minister.

== Early life ==
Edmund was the eldest son of Edmund Calamy the Elder. His mother was, Mary Snelling, daughter of Robert Snelling. He was born at Bury St. Edmunds about 1636. His early training he got from his father, who sent him to Cambridge, where he was entered at Sidney Sussex College on 28 March 1652. On 10 November 1653 Edmund and two others received presbyterian ordination at Moreton, Essex, of which Samuel Hoard (not one of the five ordainers) was rector.

== Career ==
Having graduated B.A. in 1654 he was transferred to Pembroke Hall on 13 March 1656, and graduated M.A. in 1658. His son states that he became a fellow of Pembroke, but this is not confirmed by the records. Hoard died in February 1658, and Calamy was presented by the trustees of the deceased Robert Rich, 3rd Earl of Warwick, to the rectory of Moreton, where he had preached for some time with acceptance. On 20 April 1659 the presentation was confirmed by the commissioners for approbation of public preachers. He gave four bonds to insure the payment as first-fruits to Richard Cromwell, lord protector, or his successors. Notwithstanding his father's example he never took the covenant. Like his father, he welcomed the restoration of the monarchy, and in 1661 he gave generously to the voluntary contribution for the supply of the king's exchequer. But on the passing of the Act of Uniformity 1662 he suffered ejection as a nonconformist, and went to live with his father in London. In 1665 he was chaplain to Sir Samuel Barnardiston, at Brightwell Hall, near Ipswich, but returned to his father in the following year, and was with him till his death. Three years afterwards he married (1669) and set up house in the parish of St. Mary Aldermanbury. Here he preached privately to a few friends. This was illegal, and exposed him to the annoyance and costs of a crown office prosecution. Though warrants were issued against him, he was never disturbed at his services, and managed to avoid arrest. On the king's declaration of indulgence, 15 March 1672, he took out a license and quietly ministered to a small congregation at Curriers' Hall, near Cripplegate. His character was essentially that of a man of peace and piety. His son tells us that he instilled moderation into him from his very cradle. With his brother Benjamin Calamy, who became incumbent of the parish in which he lived, he was on excellent terms, and among his intimate friends was Richard Kidder, afterwards bishop of Bath and Wells (originally a nonconformist). He led a very retired life, never seeking fame or popularity, and was carried off by consumption. He died suddenly in the night, while on a visit in May 1685 to the astronomer Edward Haynes, of Totteridge, near Barnet, a member of his flock. He was buried under the pulpit at St. Mary Aldermanbury.

== Family ==
In 1669 he married Mary, eldest daughter of Joshua Gearing of Tooting, a retired London trader, only brother of Thomas Gearing, vice-provost of King's College, Cambridge. His widow died at Bath in March 1715, and was buried in Aldermanbury churchyard. Their children were Edmund (1671–1732), followed by four daughters, of whom the second died of consumption in 1692. Calamy never published anything.
