= Smectymnuus =

Group of clergy active in 1641 England

Smectymnuus was the nom de plume of a group of Puritan clergymen active in England in 1641 during the reign of Charles I. It comprised four leading English churchmen, and one Scottish minister (Thomas Young). They went on to provide leadership for the anti-episcopal forces in the Church of England, continuing into the Westminster Assembly, where they also opposed the Independent movement.

The name is an acronym derived from the initials of the five authors: Stephen Marshall, Edmund Calamy, Thomas Young, Matthew Newcomen, and William Spurstow. Their first pamphlet, An Answer to a booke entituled, An Humble Remonstrance. In Which, the Original of Liturgy and Episcopacy is discussed, appeared in March 1641. The pamphlet was written in response to Joseph Hall's An Humble Remonstrance to the High Court of Parliament. It is thought that John Milton wrote the postscript for Smectymnuus's reply.

This response provoked Hall to write another reply: A Defence of the Humble Remonstrance, against the Frivolous and false Expectations of Smectymnuus. Smectymnuus answered Hall again with their A Vindication of the Answer to the Humble Remonstrance, from the Unjust Imputations of Frivolousnesse and Falsehood.

Milton also published two tracts defending the Smectymnuus group from Hall: Animadversions upon The Remonstrants Defence Against Smectymnvvs (1641) and Apology for Smectymnuus (1642). Thomas Young was a former tutor and close friend to Milton.
