= Milton's antiprelatical tracts =

Series of pamphlets by John Milton

John Milton's antiprelatical tracts are a series of five political pamphlets that attack the episcopal form of church leadership.

== Background ==
During the Bishops' Wars of 1639 and 1640, Milton joined the factions opposing the policies of William Laud, Archbishop of Canterbury, and the policies of the Church of England. Soon after, an antiprelatical movement started and the Root and Branch petition was put to Parliament 11 December 1640. The petition called for the end of the episcopal hierarchy and Laud was removed from his position on 18 December 1640. After a few months, a royalist, pro-episcopal movement was started. This movement was led by Joseph Hall, and it was he that produced pamphlets supporting the Church of England hierarchy.

Hall published An Humble Remonstrance to the High Court of Parliament in January 1641. The tract argued in support of the Church of England's liturgy and the episcopal hierarchy of the church. This work was responded to by Smectymnuus, five Puritan clergy, in the work An Answer to a Booke Entituled, An Humble Remonstrance. This publication started a pamphlet dispute between the two sides, and Hall published A Defence of the Humble Remonstrance against the Frivolous... Exceptions of Smectymnuus on 12 April 1641. This tract was responded to with Vindication of the Answer to the Humble Remonstrance, from the Unjust Imputations of Frivolousness and Falsehood on 26 June 1641 by Smectymnuus. Milton joined in the debate with his Of Reformation published May 1641. The debate between Hall and Milton became personalised as the conflict progressed, with an ever-increasing emphasis on personal integrity.

== Tracts ==
=== Of Reformation ===
Of Reformation was Milton's first independently produced work, and was published in May 1641. Milton's argument focuses on both the role of church government and of government in general, especially of the importance of republicanism. Throughout the work, Milton opposed the establishment of a central Church government because he believed that individual congregations should govern themselves.

=== Of Prelatical Episcopacy ===
Of Prelatical Episcopacy is the shortest of Milton's antiprelatical tracts and was written as a response to many works, including Archbishop James Ussher's The Judgement of Doctor Rainoldes Touching the Originall of Episcopacy (25 May 1641). The tract was published in either June or July 1641. Milton's main argument is a discussion of the nature of truth and how truth can only be attained through scripture. The work is openly hostile to any need for a medium between the Bible and the individual reader, especially such mediation as is provided by an organized church.

=== Animadversions ===
Animadversions, published July 1641, was written as a response to the works and claims of Hall. The tract is filled with direct attacks against Hall's person, and this is accomplished through satire and mockery. Like his other tracts, Milton continues to attack the authority of church governments and liturgies while emphasizing how an individual's reading of the Bible is more important than other considerations.

=== The Reason of Church-Government ===
Milton published The Reason for Church-Government Urg'd against Prelaty in January/February 1642. Although the tract was the fourth of his antiprelatical tracts, there was a 6 months delay after the publication of Animadversions. The work is a response to an attack on his previous works which was titled Certain Briefe Treatises, Written by Diverse Learned Men, Concerning the Ancient and Moderne Government of the Church. Unlike Milton's previous three, he including his name upon the tract and he emphasized himself within the text. This tract includes a detailed discussion, in the preface of Book II, of Miltons views on literature and genres.

=== Apology for Smectymnuus ===
Apology for Smectymnuus was published in April 1642 and is his final antiprelatical tract. The tract was written as a response to another refutation by Hall against an earlier tract. The tract praises Parliament and emphasizes that they are both reformers and the foundation of England. The work also contains some of Milton's Aristotelian feelings about man as a political animal.
