= Sir Thomas Burdett, 1st Baronet, of Bramcote =

English Sheriff and baronet

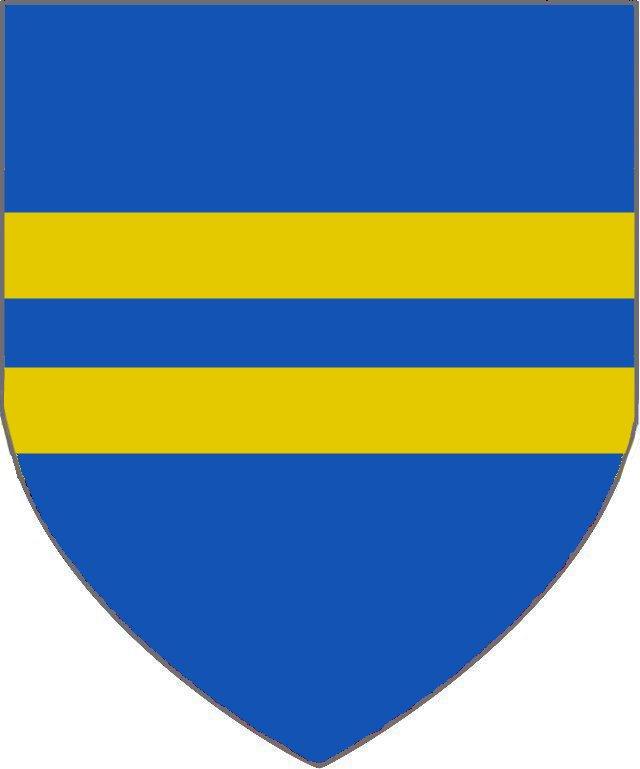
Arms of Burdett of Bramcote: Azure, two bars or (arms of their ancestor Sir William Burdet (died pre-1309) of Lowesby in Leicestershire)

Sir Thomas Burdett, 1st Baronet (3 August 1585 – ca. 1647) was an English Sheriff and baronet.

== Life ==
Burdett was born on 3 August 1585, the son of Robert Burdett and Mary Wilson. He married Jane Francis, daughter of William Francis and Elizabeth Francis, in 1602. Jane was renowned for her learning and connections within the literary circle. He matriculated at Balliol College, Oxford on 6 May 1603, but did not graduate. He held the office of High Sheriff of Derbyshire from 1610 to 1611. He was created 1st Baronet Burdett, of Bramcote, Warwickshire on 25 February 1619.

Burdett married twice and he died aged 61 before May 1647. He was buried at Repton, Derbyshire. His will was probated on 22 May 1647. His son Francis (10 September 1608 - 30 December 1696) inherited the baronetcy.

Baronetage of England
New creation	Baronet (of Bramcote); 1619–1647	Succeeded by Francis Burdett
