= Mordaunt =

Mordaunt is both a surname and a given name. Notable people with the name include:

== Surname ==
- Charles Mordaunt (disambiguation), several earls and baronets
- Harry Mordaunt (1663–1720), English lieutenant-general
- Henry Mordaunt (Royal Navy officer) (died 1710), English politician and Royal Navy captain
- David Mordaunt (1937–2020), English cricketer, teacher and expeditioner
- Elinor Mordaunt (1872–1942), English author and traveler
- Gerald Mordaunt (1873–1959), English cricketer
- Harriet Mordaunt (1848–1906), wife of Sir Charles Mordaunt, 10th Baronet, and alleged mistress of Edward VII
- Henry Mordaunt, 2nd Earl of Peterborough (1621–1697), English soldier, peer, and courtier
- Sir Henry Mordaunt, 12th Baronet (1867–1939), English cricketer
- John Mordaunt (disambiguation), numerous persons
- Lewis Mordaunt, 3rd Baron Mordaunt (1538-1601), English peer and politician
- Norman Mordaunt, co-founder in 1967 of British loudspeaker company Mordaunt-Short
- Osbert Mordaunt (cricketer, born 1842) (1842–1923), English cricketer and clergyman
- Osbert Mordaunt (cricketer, born 1876) (1876–1949), English cricketer
- Penny Mordaunt (born 1973), British politician
- Thomas Osbert Mordaunt (1730–1809), British officer and poet

== Given name ==
- Mordaunt Bisset (1825–c. 1884), British politician and Member of Parliament
- Mordaunt Cracherode (died 1773 or possibly 1768), British Army officer
- J. Mordaunt Crook (born 1937), English architectural historian
- Mordaunt Doll (1888–1966), English cricketer
- Mordaunt Hall (1878–1973), American film critic
- Sir Mordaunt Martin, 4th Baronet (c. 1740–1815), English country gentleman
- Mordaunt Shairp (1887–1939), English dramatist and screenwriter

== Fictional characters ==
- Mordaunt, a main villain of the 1845 novel Twenty Years After by Alexandre Dumas
- Mordaunt, the central male character in the 1800 novel Mordaunt, Sketches of Life, Characters, and Manners in Various Countries; including the memoirs of a French Lady of Quality by John Moore
- Mordaunt Heatherstone, son of General John Berthier Heatherstone in the 1888 novel The Mystery of Cloomber by Arthur Conan Doyle
- Mordaunt Reeves, a character in The Viaduct Murder by Ronald Knox, 1925
- Mordaunt Mertoun, one of the protagonists in Walter Scott's novel The Pirate

== See also ==
- DeMordaunt
