= Harriet Mordaunt =

19th-century British woman

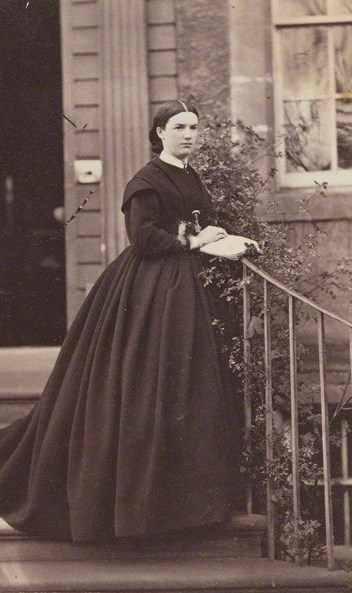
Harriet Mordaunt in the mid-1860s

Harriet Sarah, Lady Mordaunt (née Moncreiffe; 7 February 1848 – 9 May 1906), was the Scottish wife of an English baronet and member of parliament, Sir Charles Mordaunt. She was the respondent in a sensational divorce case in which the Prince of Wales (later King Edward VII) was embroiled, and after a counter-petition led to a finding of mental disorder she spent the remaining 36 years of her life out of sight in a series of privately rented houses, and then in various private lunatic asylums, finally ending her days in Sutton, Surrey.

== Early life and family ==
Lady Mordaunt was born Harriet Moncreiffe. Some writers have referred to her as "Lady Harriet Mordaunt", but that style would only be correct if she had been the daughter of an earl, marquess, or duke. Her parents were Sir Thomas Moncreiffe of that Ilk, (Note: "Of that Ilk" means "of that same place", i.e. it is a contraction of "Moncreiffe of Moncreiffe".) 7th Baronet (1822–1879) of Moncreiffe House, (Note: The original Moncreiffe House (1679) was destroyed by fire in 1957.) Perthshire, Scotland, and his wife, Lady Louisa Hay-Drummond (died 1898), eldest daughter of the Earl of Kinnoull. They had sixteen children, including eight "beautiful" daughters, most of whom were in due course "extremely well married". Lady Mordaunt was their fourth child and fourth daughter. Her sister Georgina, the Moncreiffes' third daughter, known to the family as "Georgy", became Georgina, Countess of Dudley, her husband having been dubbed "frizzle wig" by Lady Mordaunt. (Note: A caricature of Lord Dudley by Ape, published in Vanity Fair in June 1870, suggests that this was an apt description.) In 1920, Margot Asquith recalled that "groups of beauties like the Moncrieffes [sic] ... were to be seen in the salons of the 'eighties. There is nothing at all like this in London today".

Sir Thomas Moncreiffe served in the Grenadier Guards and become a captain in the Atholl Highlanders. He was captain of The Royal and Ancient Golf Club of St Andrews.

The atmosphere at Moncreiffe has been described as "free and easy". During her childhood, Harriet Moncreiffe was acquainted with Albert Edward, Prince of Wales and, after his marriage to Princess Alexandra of Denmark in 1863, attended informal parties, including dances at Abergeldie Castle, near Balmoral, which the Prince used as his Highland home. In November 1865, she was invited to Sandringham, the Waleses' house in Norfolk, and subsequently joined the Prince and Princess on various occasions in London. Lady Mordaunt grew up to be pretty and flirtatious, but also headstrong and, ultimately, rather unbalanced.

== Marriage ==
Walton Hall, Warwickshire, home of Sir Charles and Lady Mordaunt

On 6 December 1866, at the age of 18, Harriet Moncreiffe married Sir Charles Mordaunt, 10th baronet (1836–1897) at St. John’s Episcopal Church in Perth. Sir Charles was a Conservative M.P. for the two-member constituency of South Warwickshire from 1859 to 1868. Through his brother, John Murray Mordaunt (1837–1923), who played cricket for Warwickshire and I Zingari, he was the uncle of three other cricketing Mordaunts, H.J. (Sir Henry Mordaunt, 12th baronet), E.C. and G.J., who all appeared at county level.

The couple lived at Walton Hall, Warwickshire, which, to mark his coming-of-age, Sir Charles had commissioned in the fashionable Gothic Revival style from the architect George Gilbert Scott, who later designed St Pancras railway station in London. A descendant of Sir Charles once counted 72 bedrooms at Walton. They also had a residence in Belgrave Square, London.

The Mordaunts remained part of the so-called "Marlborough House set" who were associated socially with the Prince and Princess of Wales. (Note: The Prince and Princess made their home at Marlborough House, London.) According to later legal reports, Sir Charles made a "handsome" settlement on his wife at the time of their marriage and initially they appeared to live "most happily together". However, it became clear subsequently that Lady Mordaunt was in the habit of entertaining male guests alone while her husband was absent on Parliamentary business or engaged in his various sporting pursuits.

== Extramarital activities and birth of a daughter ==
The Mordaunts had toured Switzerland together early in their marriage, but when, in June 1868, Sir Charles prepared for an annual fishing trip to Norway, which was then part of the United Kingdoms of Sweden and Norway, Lady Mordaunt encouraged him to go on his own. Arrangements were made for her to remain at Walton Hall in the company of a sister and another lady. However, when Sir Charles returned early from Norway, he found his wife alone. One of her maids later testified that, during Sir Charles's absence, Lady Mordaunt had been visited in London by Viscount Cole (later 4th Earl of Enniskillen), who, after dinner, had "remained alone with her until a very late hour"; on another occasion, he had travelled with her by train from Paddington station to Reading, where he alighted from a carriage of which they had been the only occupants. Other servants, who seem to have resented Lady Mordaunt's behaviour, added their own accounts of Lord Cole’s visits.

Parliament rose on 28 July 1868, and in November Sir Charles did not stand for re-election. The Liberal Party swept to power at the first general election since Disraeli's Reform Act 1867. By then, Lady Mordaunt was five months pregnant. On 28 February 1869 she gave birth prematurely to a daughter, Violet Caroline. (Note: Some writers, including Souhami and Michael Havers et al (1977) The Royal Baccarat Scandal, have referred to the baby as a boy and others merely to a child. In correspondence of 1869 relating to Violet's custody, she was referred to as "it".) The timing was significant, in view of Sir Charles's absence on a fishing trip the previous year. Doctors initially feared that the child might be blind, causing Lady Mordaunt to become hysterical, imagining that this had been brought about by a hereditary sexually transmitted disease. (At the time, gossip surrounding Freddy Johnstone, a close friend of the Prince of Wales, whom Lady Mordaunt shortly afterwards claimed to have been one of her lovers, was that he suffered from such a disease.) Violet’s eye infection was successfully treated and no venereal infection was found in either mother or child. However, following this episode, Lady Mordaunt declared to her husband, "Charlie, I have deceived you; the child is not yours; it’s Lord Cole’s". She further claimed to have committed adultery with "Lord Cole, Sir Frederick Johnstone, the Prince of Wales and others, often and in open day". As one of Princess Alexandra’s biographers put it, "the ensuing scandal was immense".

== Involvement of the Prince of Wales ==
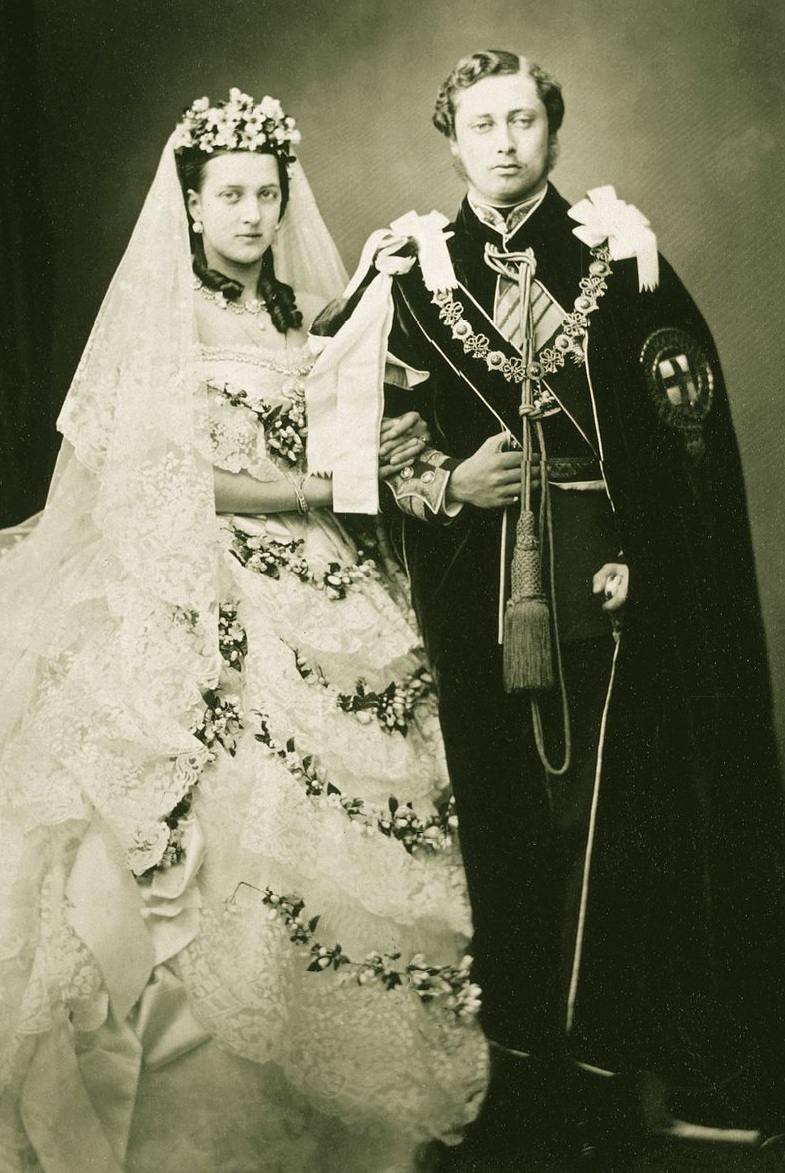
The Prince and Princess of Wales on their wedding day, 1863

Sir Charles forced the drawer of Lady Mordaunt's writing desk and found a number of letters to her from the Prince of Wales. It was plainly unwise for the Prince to have written these and, throughout his life, he seems to have had trouble resisting such communication with women he admired. (Note: Only a few years after the Mordaunt affair, Lord Randolph Churchill threatened to make public imprudent letters that the Prince had written to the Countess of Aylesford if he did not use his influence to persuade her husband, the 7th Earl, to withdraw a divorce suit in which Lord Randolph's brother, the Marquess of Blandford, was named as co-respondent.) However, their content (though very similar to the sort of things he wrote some years later to his mistress, Alice Keppel) was, reportedly, innocuous. When published later in provincial newspapers and The Times, they were judged to be "simple, gossipy, everyday letters"; a biographer of the actress Lily Langtry, another of the Prince's mistresses, observed that "typical lines to Harriet might have come from a benevolent uncle".

There is a widely recounted story of Sir Charles' returning to Walton Hall to find his wife in the company of the Prince and two white ponies, which, following the Prince’s expulsion from the premises, he had shot in her presence. However, although Sir Charles acted very bitterly towards the Prince, he did not cite him in any legal action and so formal contemporaneous accounts of Lady Mordaunt’s activities tend to skirt around such episodes.

== Legal proceedings ==
Sir Charles commenced proceedings for divorce on 20 April 1869. In view of her nervous and erratic behaviour after Violet’s birth, of which full details were given by her servants, Lady Mordaunt’s family claimed that she was insane and unfit to plead. A counter-affidavit on behalf of Sir Charles maintained that she was feigning a mental disorder. On 30 July 1869, Sir Thomas Moncreiffe, acting as his daughter’s guardian ad litem, formally alleged that, at the time the summons was served on her, she was "not of sound mind". In her diary entry for 6 August, Princess Alexandra noted that "a commission has been ordered to investigate and report if Harriet Mordaunt is truly mad".

=== Mordaunt v. Mordaunt, Cole & Johnstone (1870) ===
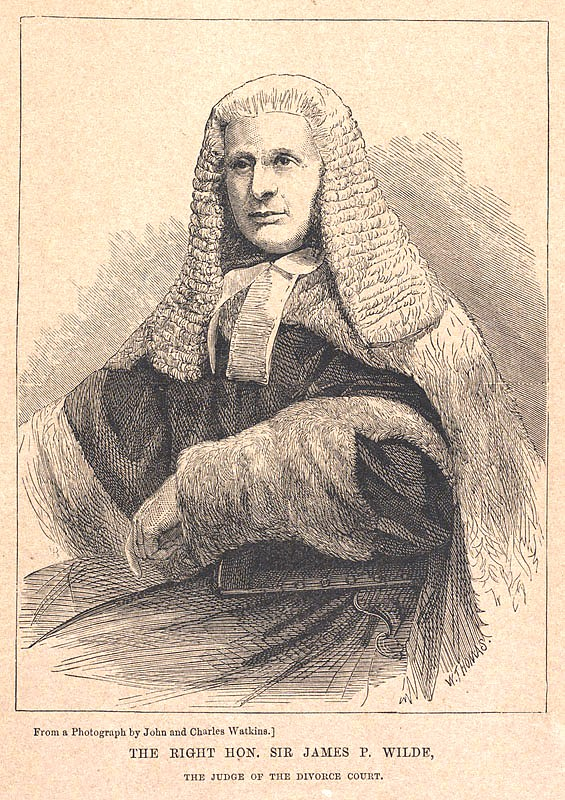
Lord Penzance, judge in the Mordaunt divorce case

The resulting case came up for trial before Lord Penzance in the Court for Divorce and Matrimonial Causes on 23 February 1870. Having been summoned to appear as a witness, the Prince of Wales was examined for seven minutes by Lady Mordaunt's counsel, the first time that a Prince of Wales had given evidence in open court. While admitting visits to Lady Mordaunt while her husband was away, he flatly denied any "improper familiarity" or "criminal act" with her – "Never!" – and was not cross-examined by Sir Charles's counsel, William Ballantine. The Prince had sought advice about whether to accept the subpoena from, among others, the Chief Justice of the Queen's Bench, Sir Alexander Cockburn, who in advising him to do so, described Lady Mordaunt as "a lady of such apparently fragile virtue" and referred to the notion that "one to whom a woman has given herself up is bound, even at the cost of committing perjury, to protect her honour".

After a trial lasting seven days, and including evidence from the psychiatrist Dr Thomas Harrington Tuke, the jury determined that Lady Mordaunt was suffering from "puerperal mania" at the time the summons was served on her and that she was unable to instruct a lawyer in her defence. Accordingly, Sir Charles's petition for divorce was dismissed, while Lady Mordaunt was committed to an asylum.

=== Alleged conspiracy ===
The finding of insanity gave rise to suspicions that there was a conspiracy to silence Lady Mordaunt. Reynold’s News, for example, asked why the Prince ("a young married man") should have been "so eager to pay weekly visits to a young married woman when her husband was absent, if it was all so innocent?"

There is some evidence that the Establishment closed ranks at a time when republican sympathies in Britain and Ireland had been aroused by Queen Victoria’s virtual withdrawal from public life. It seems that, in advance of the trial, the Prince's Household received private assurances that his position would be protected as far as possible, and, some years later, his private secretary, Francis Knollys, recalled that the Prime Minister William Gladstone had been involved indirectly "and successfully" behind the scenes.

The Queen strongly disapproved of her son's (and daughter-in-law's) lifestyle, writing to her eldest daughter, the Crown Princess of Prussia, on 2 March 1870 that "they lead far too frivolous a life and are far too intimate with people – with a small set of not the best and wisest people who consider being fast the right thing". She seemed especially concerned (with, as Roy Hattersley has put it, "admirable understanding of the moral superiority of the lower orders of society") that the affair could damage the Prince's reputation in the eyes of "the middle and lower classes". However, Victoria seems to have been convinced of her son's innocence regarding Lady Mordaunt and remained staunch in his defence, as did Alexandra, who described him to her sister-in-law Princess Louise as "my naughty little man", but was nonetheless deeply hurt by the affair. (Note: When the Prince and Princess dined with the Prime Minister on the day that the Prince gave evidence in the Mordaunt case, Mrs. Gladstone's niece, Lady Frederick Cavendish, noted that "the Princess looked lovely, but very sad when she was not exerting herself".) For his part, Gladstone observed rather despairingly to his Colonial Secretary, Lord Granville, that "in rude and general terms, the Queen is invisible and the Prince of Wales is not respected".

=== Attitudes to Lady Mordaunt's mental condition ===
Historians have taken differing stances on the extent of Lady Mordaunt’s mental illness. Diana Souhami (1996) reflected on Cockburn’s pre-trial observations that neither her "fragile virtue" nor "honour" were protected; that her "punishment" was to be declared insane; and that "it proved expedient to call her mad and bad". However, Michael Havers, a future Lord Chancellor who published an account in 1977 of the Prince’s involvement in the Tranby Croft baccarat scandal of 1890, commented that, by the time the Mordaunt case came up, Lady Mordaunt was "quite obviously insane" and that her physical condition had also deteriorated.

In the 1960s, the historical biographer, Elizabeth Hamilton, whose husband, Sir Richard Hamilton, 9th baronet (1911–2001), inherited Walton Hall in 1961, (Note: Sir Charles Mordaunt's will had provided for Walton Hall to pass to the eldest son of his second wife's daughter. The entertainer Danny La Rue turned it into a show-business venue in the 1970s, but made a substantial loss when the enterprise failed in 1983.) found a vast consignment of papers there that she used as the basis of a book about the scandal. She took the view that Lady Mordaunt probably did fake her madness at first, but added that "if you feign insanity, it can become a habit, and you can genuinely go mad". Reviewing Lady Hamilton's book for The Sunday Telegraph, Nicola Shulman, Marchioness of Normanby, observed that "the sly unhindered crimes committed against Harriet Mordaunt make plain what rights a woman was owed in 1869".

== After the trial ==
=== Asylum at Chiswick ===
Records of the census of 1871 reveal that Lady Mordaunt was living on the western outskirts of London, at the Manor House asylum in Chiswick whose clinical director was Thomas Harrington Tuke. Tuke was, at the time, one of the most respected practitioners in lunacy and, together with the Prince of Wales' physician, William Gull, played a prominent role in the Mordaunt case; his previous patients included the Chartist leader Feargus O’Connor, the painter Sir Edwin Landseer and Sophy Gray, sister-in-law and muse of the painter John Everett Millais. In evidence to the court, Tuke had been clear in his assertion that Lady Mordaunt was suffering from puerperal insanity, regarding her confessions of serial adultery with several men up to a few weeks before the birth of her daughter as typical delusions associated with that condition.

=== Divorce ===
There is very limited information available about Lady Mordaunt’s life between 1871 and her death in 1906. After various legal appeals, including to the House of Lords (in the judicial capacity that it exercised then), Sir Charles Mordaunt’s petition for divorce was remitted to the original court on the basis that Lady Mordaunt’s insanity was not, as a matter of law, a bar to proceedings. Eventually, in 1875, Sir Charles was granted a divorce on the grounds of his wife’s adultery with Lord Cole, who did not contest the action. In 1878 Sir Charles married Mary Louisa Cholmondeley, the daughter of a parson.

=== Final years ===
In 1877, Lady Mordaunt was moved from Chiswick to Hayes Park Private Asylum, Hillingdon, attended by Dr Edward Benbow. The Census of 1881 shows Harriett Mordaunt still at Hayes Park, Hillingdon, described as a boarder along with several other patients of aristocratic title. However, the Census of 1891 has her at a private residence known as "Hampton Lea", Langley Park Road, Sutton, Surrey, (Note: A 1903 Francis Frith photograph exists showing part of Langley Park Road consisting of large gable-ended Victorian houses. However, the area seems to have been completely redeveloped in the 1960s, and no Victorian dwellings exist today. At the time Harriett Mordaunt was at "Hampton Lea" the Census material shows that the Head of the Household was William John DeSalis (1834–1904), a clerk in the War Office, and his wife Harriet Anne DeSalis (1829–1908), who was one of the most successful writers of cookbooks and household management of this period. It is possible that William DeSalis was related to William Fane DeSalis of Dawley Court, Hillingdon, who had various interests in sanatoriums and asylums, or to Charles Fane DeSalis, who was one time Chairman of Egham's Holloway Sanatorium.) her name now abbreviated to the initials HSM (as was accepted practice for those afflicted by lunacy). It is noted that her place of birth is incorrectly given as West Sussex. She appears to have an attendant. The Census of 1901 still has Harriett Mordaunt at "Hampton Lea", her name now shown as Harriett "Morgan" with the same incorrect place of birth and described as a widow, probably a reference to the death of Sir Charles, her former husband, in 1897. It seems that she no longer comes under the Lunacy Act, as her name is now fully entered, but is shown as mere "feeble-minded". Harriett Mordaunt died in May 1906. (Note: Her death certificate states she died on 9 May 1906, residing at "Hampton Lea", Sutton, of liver and kidney failure. She is described as being the widow of Charles Mordaunt, Baronet, even though he had divorced her thirty years earlier and remarried, before his death in 1897.) She is buried at Brompton Cemetery.

=== Daughter and descendants ===
Lady Mordaunt’s daughter, Violet, lived at Moncreiffe after her mother's detention at Chiswick. Sir Charles appears to have taken no direct interest in her, although he did make provision for her maintenance as part of a wider settlement after his divorce that included also a sum towards Lady Mordaunt's care. In 1890 Violet married Viscount Weymouth, later 5th Marquess of Bath. Neither her mother nor Sir Charles was present at the wedding and, despite his continual refusal to acknowledge Violet, Sir Charles appears to have been offended by the Moncreiffes' decision not to invite him. However, there is some evidence that, at Christmas the previous year, Lady Mordaunt (by then referred to as "Miss Moncreiff") was allowed out of detention to meet her future son-in-law.

Violet died in 1928. Her son Henry, the 6th Marquess, (Note: An elder son, James, was killed in the First World War.) described by Deborah, Duchess of Devonshire as "the handsomest man you ever saw", was one of the "bright young people" of the 1920s and became famous in the 1960s for developing a safari park on the family's estate at Longleat. In his entry for Who's Who, the 6th Marquess referred to his mother as the daughter of Sir Charles Mordaunt, but made no mention of Lady Mordaunt. Violet was the grandmother of the 7th Marquess who was known for his polyamorous relationships (Note: In 2011 the London Times reported that police had been called to Longleat to deal with the consequences of a dispute between two of Lord Bath's "wifelets" as to which of them should sleep with him.) and, according to Diana Mosley, was "the image" of the 5th Marquess.
