= Charles Tuke (cricketer, born 1857) =

English surgeon and cricketer

Charles Molesworth Tuke (23 May 1857 – 24 January 1925) was an English surgeon, working in the field of psychiatric care, and first-class cricketer.

== Life ==
He was born in Chiswick, the son of Thomas Harrington Tuke. Educated at St. Paul's School, London, Tuke became a medical student at St George's Hospital. He obtained a surgical diploma in 1881, and began work as a clinical assistant at Bethlem Royal Hospital. In time he worked at the family-run Manor House Asylum, at Manor Farm House, Chiswick Lane, Chiswick, with his brother Thomas Seymour Tuke (1856–1917).

After their father's death in 1888, the brothers moved the asylum to leased space at Chiswick House, with a change of name to Chiswick Asylum. They were recorded as tenants there by 1892. By then, the lease to John Crichton-Stuart, 3rd Marquess of Bute had ended, and artworks belonging to the owner, Victor Cavendish, 9th Duke of Devonshire, had been moved to Chatsworth House.

Tuke ran Chiswick Asylum alone, in the 1920s. He died in Chiswick. His widow resided at Chiswick House until 1929.

== Cricket career ==
Active as a cricketer 1882–90, Tuke played for Middlesex. He appeared in eight first-class matches.

== Family ==
Tuke married in 1883 Mary Ella Wylde, second daughter of William Henry Wylde.
