= William Henry Wylde =

William Henry Wylde may refer to:

- William Henry Wylde (politician) (1817–?)
- William Henry Wylde (civil servant) (1819–1909)

== See also ==
- William Wylde (1788–1877), Royal Artillery officer
