= Osbert Mordaunt (cricketer, born 1842) =

English cricketer and clergyman

Personal information
- Full name: Osbert Mordaunt
- Born: 4 December 1842 near Wellesbourne, Warwickshire, England
- Died: 25 September 1923 (aged 80); Hampton Lucy, Warwickshire, England
- Batting: Right-handed
- Bowling: Right/left-arm unknown style
- Relatives: John Mordaunt (brother); Francis Portman (nephew); Henry Mordaunt (nephew); Eustace Mordaunt (nephew); Gerald Mordaunt (nephew); Henry Snow (father-in-law)

Domestic team information
- Years: Team
- 1866: Marylebone Cricket Club

Career statistics
Competition	First-class
Matches	1
Runs scored	11
Batting average	5.50
100s/50s	–/–
Top score	6
Catches/stumpings	9/–
- Source: Cricinfo, 29 April 2021

Osbert Mordaunt (4 December 1842 – 25 September 1923) was an English first-class cricketer and clergyman.

The son of Sir John Mordaunt, he was born at Walton Hall in Warwickshire. The name "Osbert" has been used by members of the Mordaunt family since the 12th century, in honour of a direct ancestor of that name. Mordaunt was educated at Eton College, where he played for the college cricket eleven. From Eton he went up to Christ Church, Oxford. While at Oxford he was a member of the Oxford University Cricket Club, but did not play first-class cricket for the club. However, while at Oxford he did play first-class cricket for the Marylebone Cricket Club in 1866 against Oxford at Lord's. He batted twice in the match and made scores of 6 and 5, being dismissed by Stirling Voules and Edward Kenney respectively. He played below first class level for the counties of Warwickshire, Staffordshire, Cheshire and (in one match in 1867) for Shropshire. He was described in Scores and Biographies as a "capital hitter and a good field, generally at point or slip. He developed into a good lob-bowler, delivering with either hand, and was also a very sound judge of the game".

After graduating from Oxford, he took holy orders in the Anglican Church. His first ecclesiastical post was as a preparatory curate at Handsworth in 1871. He was appointed rector at Hampton Lucy in Warwickshire in 1874, a rectorship he would hold for 48 years. He was the proprietor of the village pub in Hampton Lucy for twenty years. Mordaunt died there in September 1923. From a cricketing family, his brother John played first-class cricket, as did four of his nephews. He was married to Jessie Louisa Snow, the daughter of the cricketer and clergyman Henry Snow.
