= John Mordaunt (cricketer) =

English cricketer, British Army officer and shipbuilder

Personal information
- Full name: John Murray Mordaunt
- Born: 30 December 1837; Stratford-upon-Avon, Warwickshire, England
- Died: 21 December 1923 (aged 85); Westminster, Middlesex, England
- Batting: Unknown
- Bowling: Unknown
- Relatives: Eustace Mordaunt (son); Gerald Mordaunt (son); Henry Mordaunt (son); Osbert Mordaunt (brother); David Mordaunt (great-grandson); Francis Portman (nephew)

Domestic team information
- Years: Team
- 1863: Marylebone Cricket Club

Career statistics
Competition	First-class
Matches	2
Runs scored	35
Batting average	11.66
100s/50s	–/–
Top score	24*
Balls bowled	20
Wickets	0
Bowling average	–
5 wickets in innings	–
10 wickets in match	–
Best bowling	–
Catches/stumpings	–/–
- Source: Cricinfo, 1 October 2021

John Murray Mordaunt DL JP (30 December 1837 — 21 December 1923) was an English first-class cricketer, British Army officer and shipbuilder.

The son of Sir John Mordaunt, he was born at Stratford-upon-Avon in December 1837. He was educated at Eton College, where he played in the cricket eleven. From Eton he went up to Christ Church at the University of Oxford, though he did not feature for the Oxford University Cricket Club during his studies there. Six years after he had graduated from Oxford, Mordaunt was commissioned as a cornet in the Warwickshire Yeomanry in September 1861 and in December 1862, he was appointed deputy lieutenant for Warwickshire. Mordaunt made two appearances in first-class cricket in 1863, playing for the Marylebone Cricket Club against Oxford University at Lord's and for the Gentlemen of Marylebone Cricket Club against the Gentlemen of Kent at Canterbury during the Canterbury Cricket Week, scoring a total of 35 runs across both matches.

In April 1864, he was promoted to lieutenant in the Warwickshire Yeomanry. Mordaunt went into business with Thomas Ridley Oswald as a shipbuilder in Southampton in 1878, with the company being declared bankrupt in 1881. In addition to having served as a deputy lieutenant for Warwickshire, Mordaunt was also a justice of the peace for the county. He died at Westminster in December 1923. He was married to Elizabeth Evelyn Cotes, a daughter of John Cotes and Lady Louisa Jenkinson, with the couple having five children; their three sons Eustace, Gerald and Henry all played first-class cricket. Other relations who also played first-class cricket included his brother, Osbert, great-grandson David Mordaunt and nephew Francis Portman.
