= Thomas Harrington Tuke =

British physician (1826–1888)

FRCPE FRCP Thomas Harrington Tuke
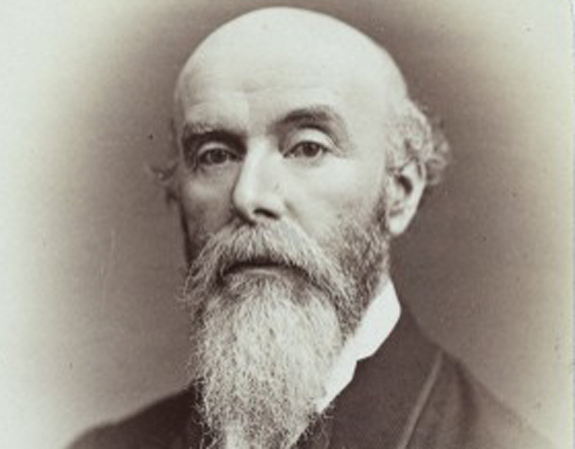
- Born: 13 June 1826
- Died: 1888
- Education: University of Edinburgh; University of St Andrews
- Children: Charles Tuke
- Scientific career
- Fields: Physician

Thomas Harrington Tuke FRCPE FRCP (13 June 1826 – 1888) was a British physician who specialised in psychiatry. He ran and enlarged the private Manor House Asylum in Chiswick (founded by his father Edward Francis Tuke), published papers on general paralysis and related topics, and contributed to the development of lunacy legislation in Victorian England. Tuke specialised in non-restraint treatment.

== Early life ==
Thomas Harrington Tuke was born on 13 June 1826, the son of the Quaker physician Edward Francis Tuke of Bristol and his wife Mary. He studied medicine at St George's Hospital; and also at the University of Edinburgh and Paris. Tuke took a University of St Andrews MD qualification in 1849.

== Career ==
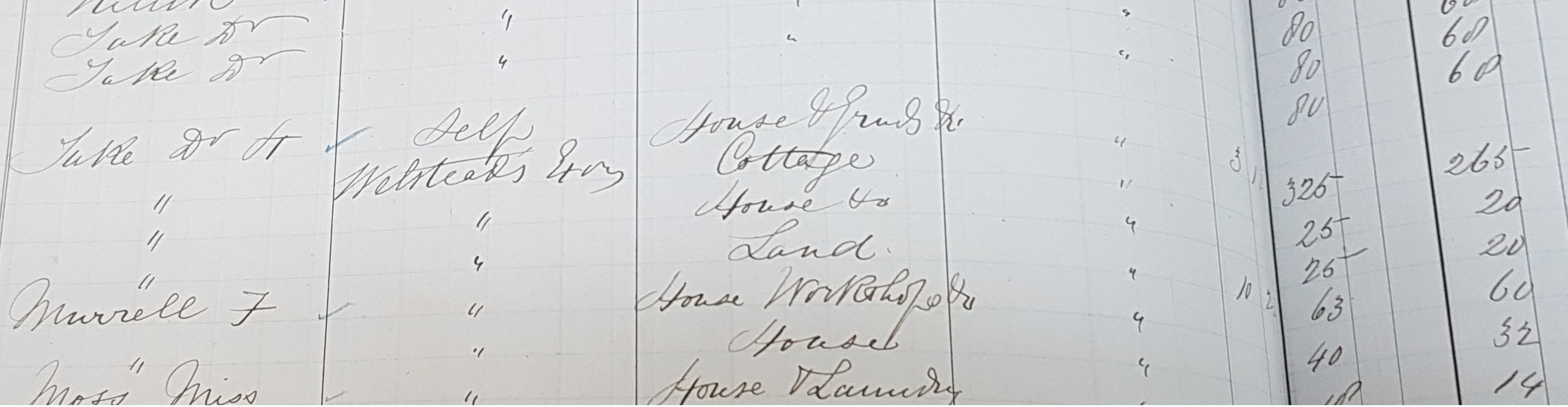

Tuke specialised in the treatment of the insane with non-restraint methods. In 1846 he took over and began to extend the private Manor House asylum in Chiswick founded by his father. How far he expanded the asylum can be seen in the 1880 rate book. Not only did he own Manor Farm House, he was also renting 2 halves of a semi-detached house and the land behind it, plus another cottage, house and some more land. In 1893 the Tukes moved out of the cottage, house and land and it became the ABC estate. In 1894 they moved out of the semi-detached houses which became part of Cranbrook Road on the Sulhamstead Estate, the houses they rented were knocked down much later and they became Stephen Fox House. In 1896 Manor Farm House was sold and it became Wilton Avenue.

He was the first to introduce nasogastric feeding of the insane. He was a Fellow of the Royal College of Physicians of Edinburgh (1858) and of the Royal College of Physicians in London (1878). He was secretary of the Medico-Psychological Association and testified before select committees of the House of Commons on amendments to the lunacy laws. Tuke was an experienced psychiatric witness and took part in the William Frederick Windham case (in which he took a position contrary to Dr Forbes Benignus Winslow), in the divorce action against Lady Mordaunt, and in the Bravo and George Victor Townley cases. His most famous patient was probably the Chartist leader Feargus O'Connor.

== Family ==
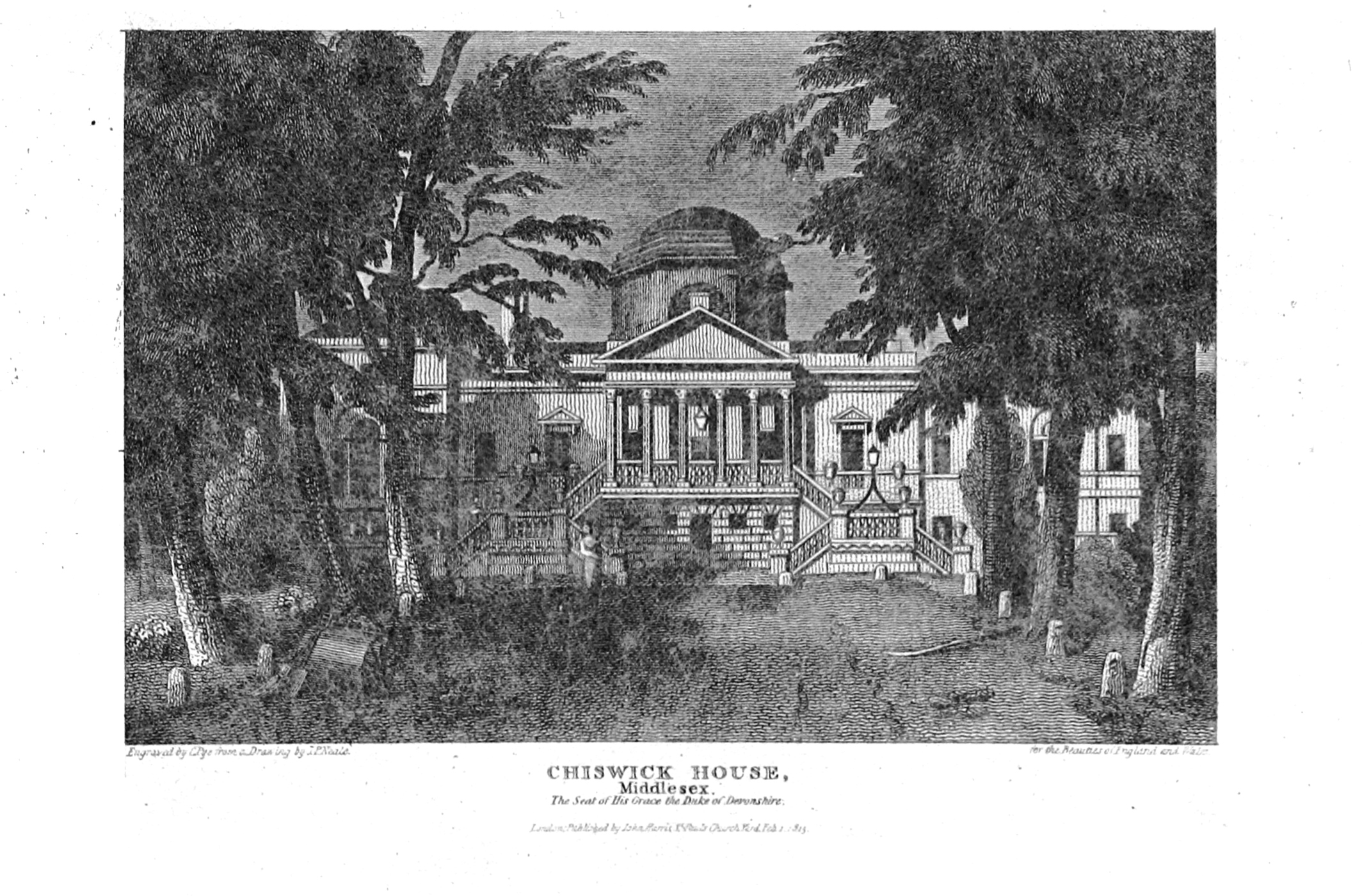
Chiswick House, showing the wings used by Tuke as asylum wards

In January 1852, Tuke married Sophia Jane Conolly, daughter of Tuke's friend and teacher Dr John Conolly of The Lawn, Hanwell. Conolly was a pioneer in non-restraint methods of treatment of the insane. Tuke and his wife had seven sons and a daughter.

Two of their sons Thomas Seymour and Charles Molesworth Tuke, both doctors, continued running the asylum and supervised its move to Chiswick House in 1893, where it remained until its closure in 1929.

== Death ==
Tuke died in 1888. He was buried in Chiswick on 13 June.
