= DeMordaunt =

DeMordaunt is a surname that comes from the French language. Notable people with the surname include:

- Reed DeMordaunt, American politician
- Gayann DeMordaunt, American politician
- Walter DeMordaunt, American architect

== See also ==
- Mordaunt
