= Chiswick Asylum =

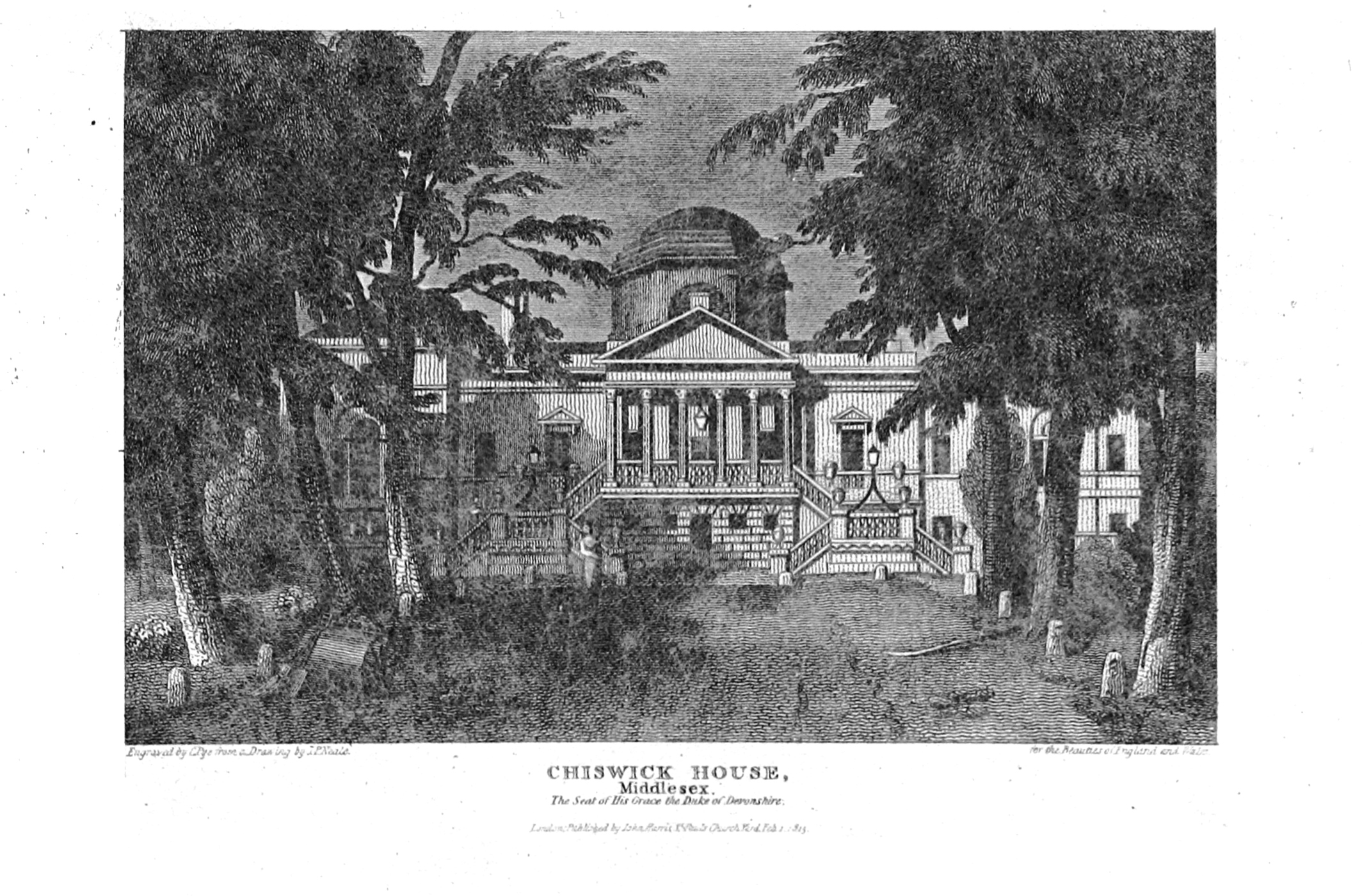
- Chiswick House with additional wings later used as asylum wards, 1820

- Location in Hounslow

Geography
- Location: Chiswick, London, England, United Kingdom
- Coordinates: 51°29′01″N 0°15′31″W

Organisation
- Type: Specialist
- Affiliated university: Mental health

Services
- Emergency department: No Accident & Emergency

History
- Founded: 1837
- Closed: 1940
- Demolished: 1956

Links
- Lists: Hospitals in England

Chiswick Asylum was an English asylum established by Edward Francis Tuke and his wife Mary as Manor House Asylum in Chiswick, in about 1837. It was continued by his son, Thomas Harrington Tuke (1826-1888), before moving to Chiswick House in 1892 and becoming the Chiswick House Asylum, where it was run by two of Thomas Tuke's sons.

== History ==
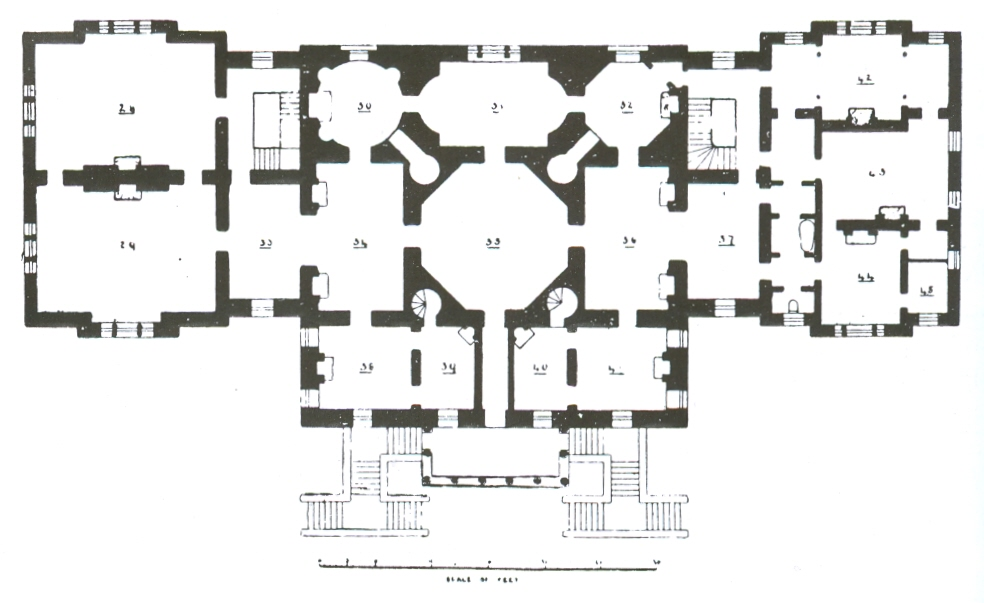
Floor plan of Chiswick House, showing the wings, now removed

Manor House Asylum was begun by Edward Francis Tuke and his wife Mary in about 1837, who took a lease on Manor Farm House in Chiswick Lane, a late 17th-century building. It was demolished in 1896.

The 9th Duke of Devonshire rented Chiswick House to the brothers Thomas Seymour and Charles Molesworth Tuke (sons of Thomas Harrington Tuke) from 1892 to 1928, when it was home to 30-40 private patients, before he sold it to Middlesex County Council in 1929. The asylum closed in 1940. The two wings that housed the patients were demolished in 1956, as were many of the outbuildings, so little trace of the asylum remains today.

== Notable patients ==
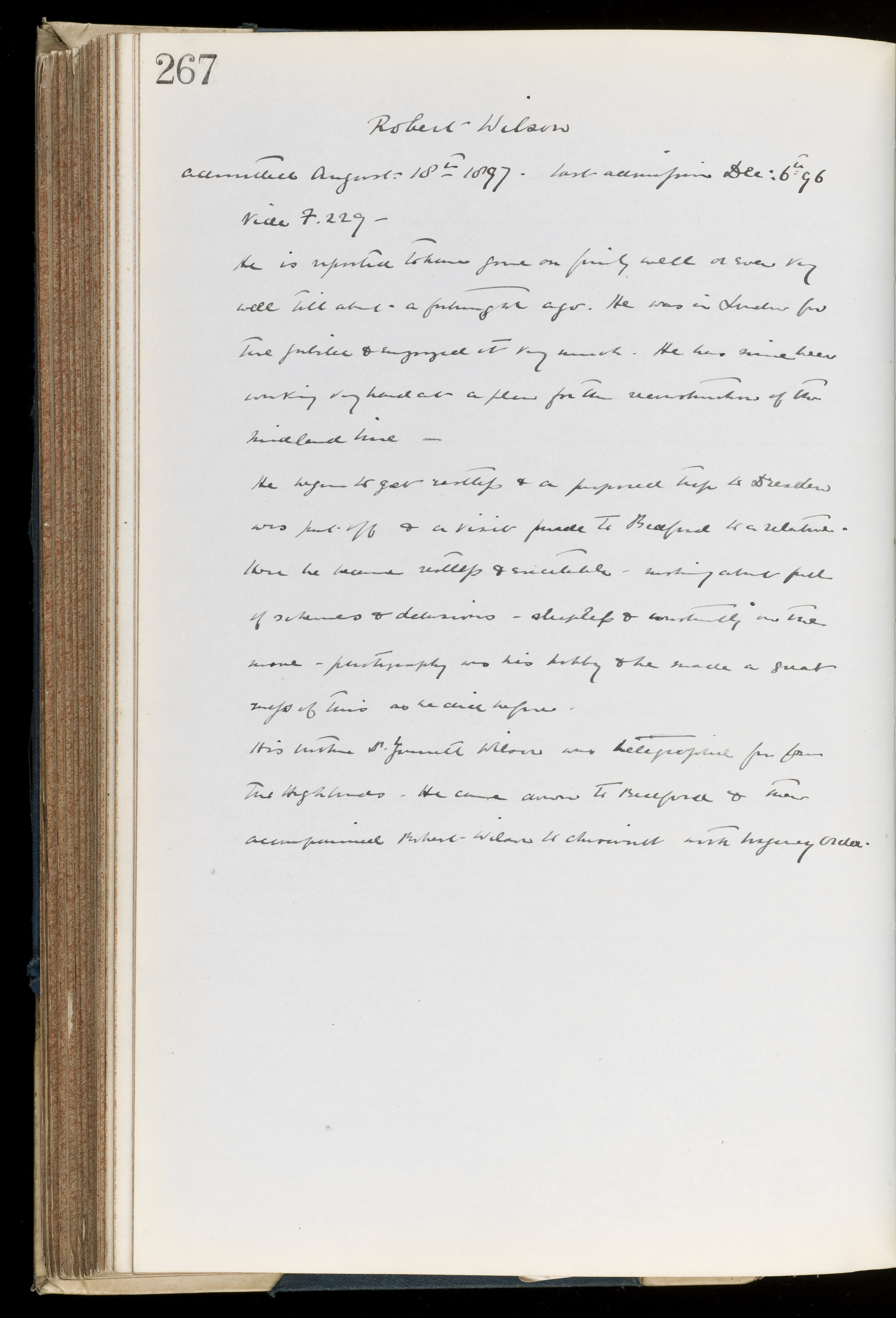
Case notes of Robert Wilson, a patient of Manor House Asylum, 1892-1907. Wellcome L0050073

In 1852, the Chartist leader Feargus O'Connor MP was declared insane after a scene in the House of Commons, and confined to Chiswick Asylum, where he remained until 1854, and died in 1855. Harriet Mordaunt spent much of her later life in the asylum.

In 1865, Rev William Cotton spent several weeks in the Manor House Asylum.
