= John Donowell =

John Donowell (floreat 1753–1786) was an eighteenth-century British architect and engraver, considered to be the equivalent of Thomas Sandby and Thomas Malton as one of the principal architect-draughtsmen in the third quarter of the eighteenth century. He exhibited in 1761 at the Free Society, then through the 1760s at the Society of Artists, and from 1778 to 1786 at the Royal Academy; prints, some hand-coloured, were published at this time.

Donowell made a number of topographical drawings, mostly views of London, such as of the Grand Walk in the then-fashionable Marylebone Gardens.

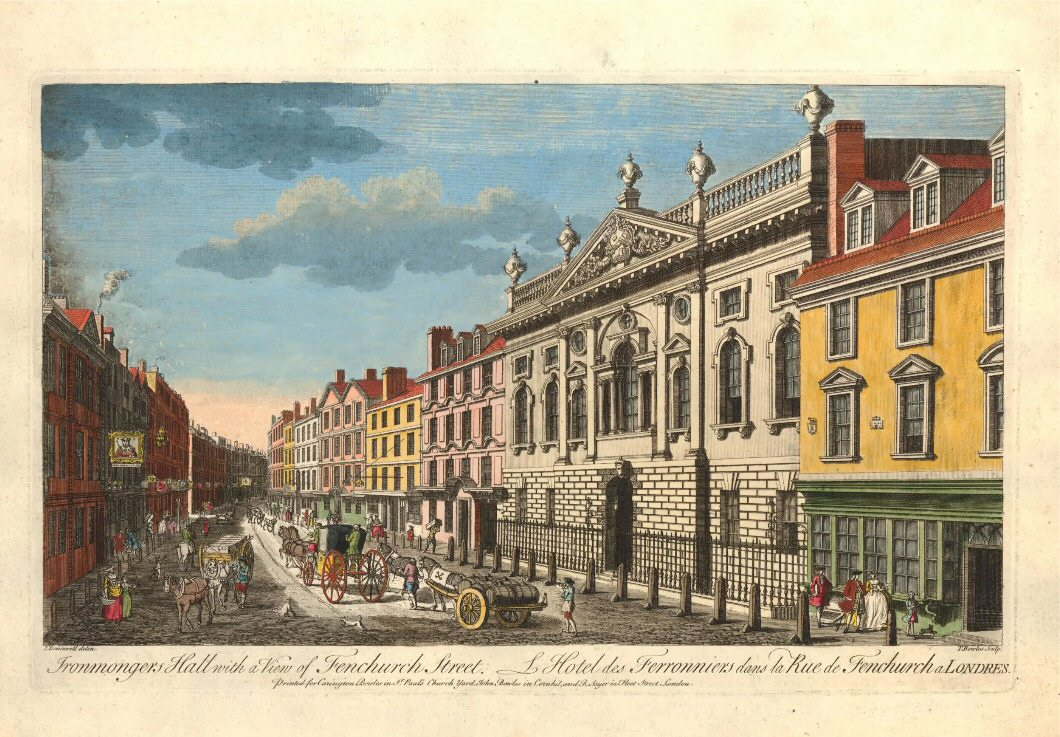
Ironmongers Hall with a view of Fenchurch Street, circa 1749

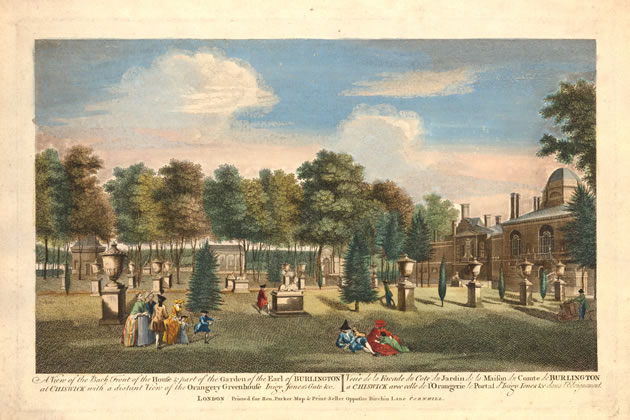
Engraving of Chiswick House and Avenue, 1753

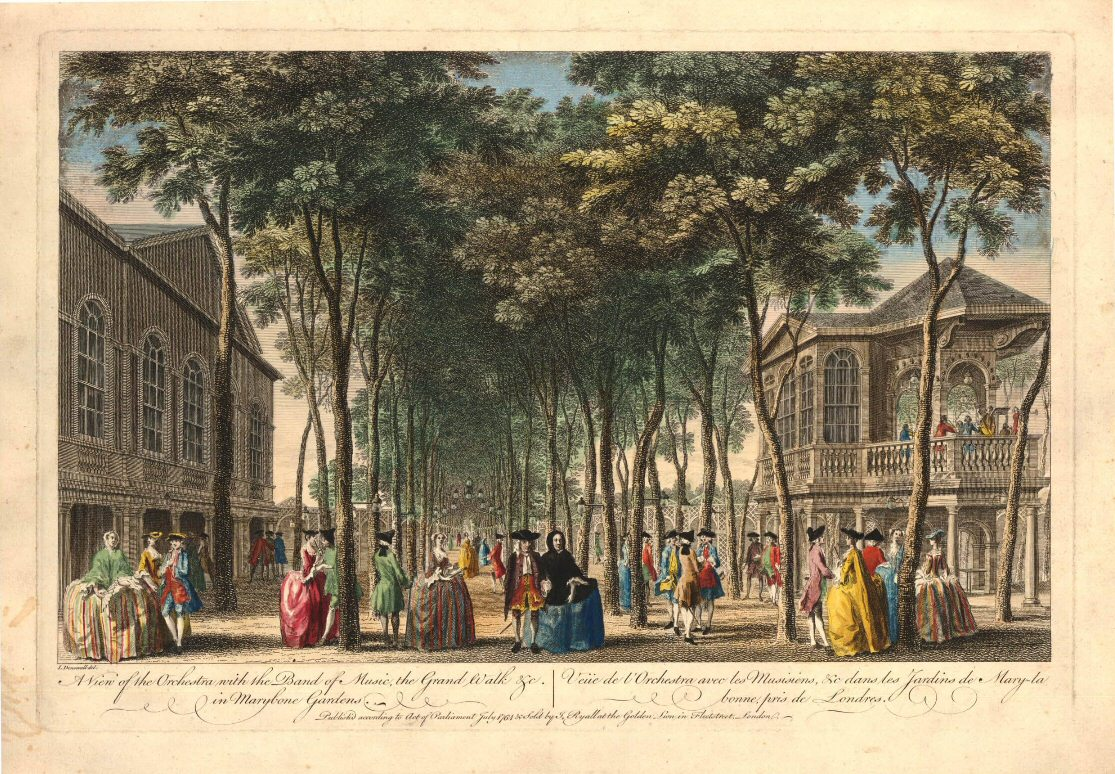
A view of the Orchestra with the Band of Music, the Grand Walk &c in Marybone Gardens, hand-coloured engraving from a drawing by Donowell, 1761

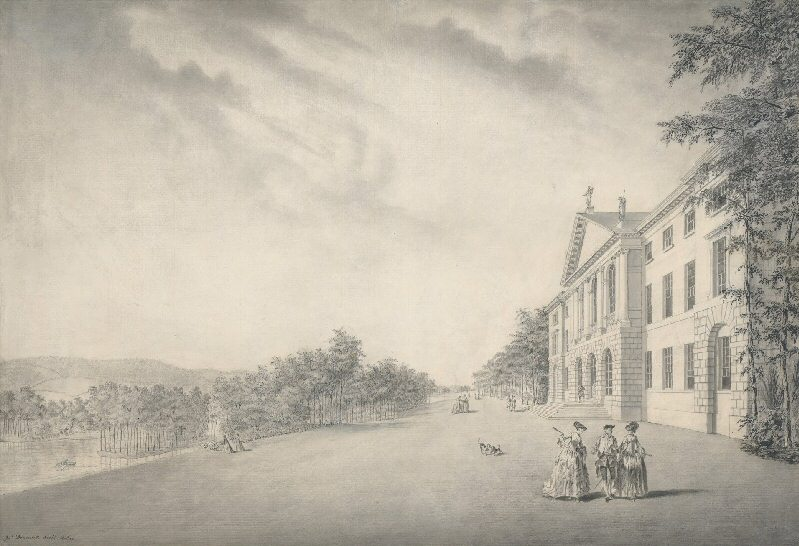
East View of West Wycombe House, Buckinghamshire, circa 1760

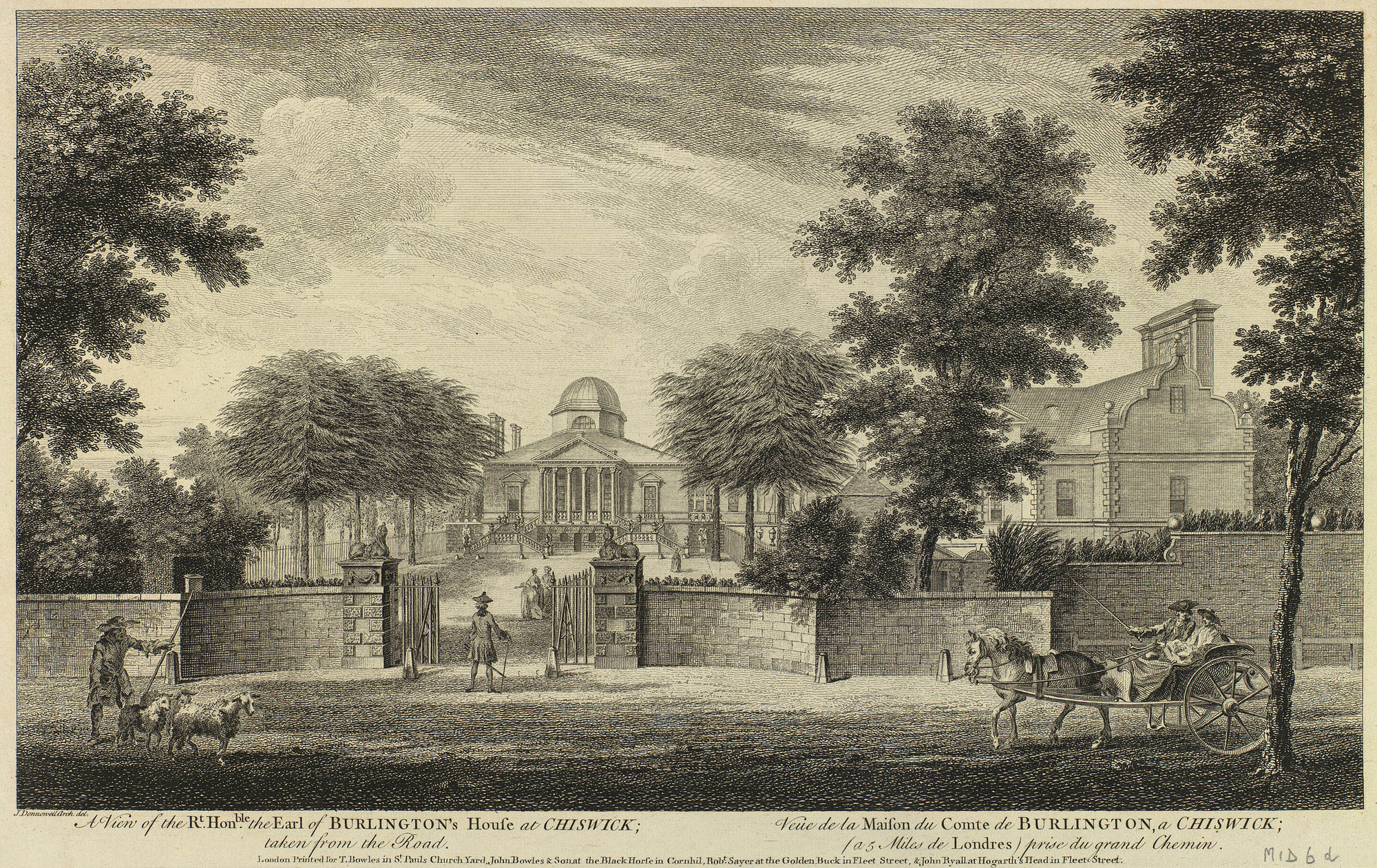
View of Burlington's House at Chiswick from the Road, circa 1763

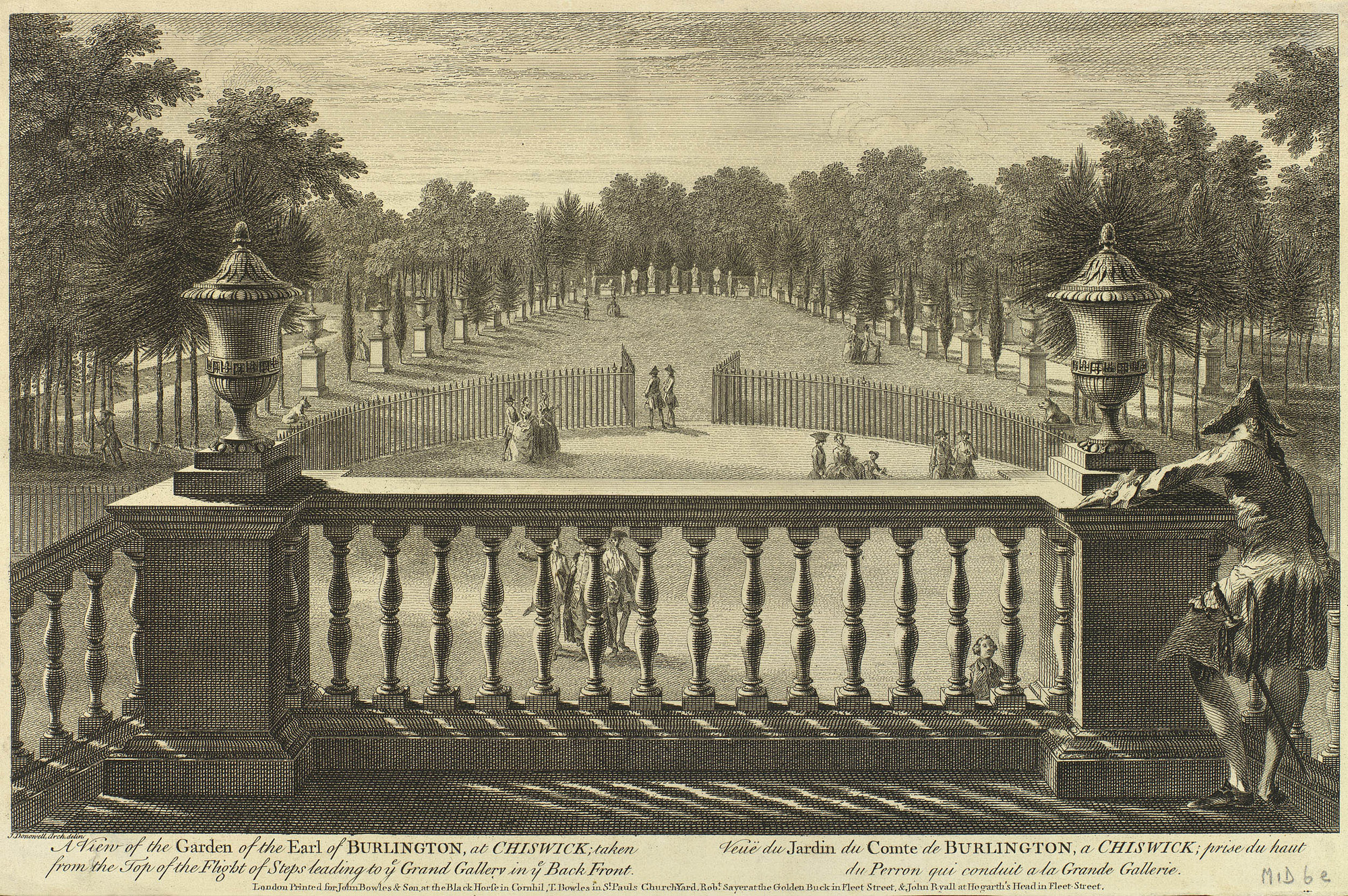
View of Burlington's Garden at Chiswick from the Steps in the Back, circa 1763
