= David Mordaunt =

English cricketer, teacher, and expeditioner (1937–2020)

Personal information
- Full name: David John Mordaunt
- Born: 24 August 1937; Chelsea, London, England
- Died: 28 November 2020 (aged 83)
- Batting: Right-handed
- Bowling: Right-arm medium-fast
- Relatives: Gerald Mordaunt (grandfather); John Mordaunt (great-grandfather)

Domestic team information
- Years: Team
- 1964: Marylebone Cricket Club
- 1964–1974: Berkshire
- 1958–1960: Sussex

Career statistics
Competition	FC	LA
Matches	20	4
Runs scored	599	144
Batting average	23.03	36.00
100s/50s	0/5	0/2
Top score	96	60
Balls bowled	1,083	219
Wickets	24	3
Bowling average	25.04	44.00
5 wickets in innings	1	0
10 wickets in match	0	–
Best bowling	5/42	3/24
Catches/stumpings	15/ –	2/ –
- Source: Cricinfo, 31 May 2010

David John Mordaunt (24 August 1937 – 28 November 2020) was an English cricketer, teacher and expeditioner.

== Cricket career ==
Mordaunt was educated at Wellington College, Berkshire, and was a prominent schoolboy cricketer. A right-handed batsman who bowled right-arm medium-fast, he made his first-class debut in 1958 for Sussex in the game against Oxford University, scoring 96 in the second innings, when he was caught trying to hit his fourth six, which would have given him a century on debut. From 1958 to 1960, Mordaunt played 19 first-class matches for Sussex as an amateur, his final match for the county coming against Gloucestershire in the 1960 County Championship. He scored 586 runs for Sussex at a batting average of 24.41, with five half-centuries and highest score of 96. With the ball he took 19 wickets at a bowling average of 28.89, with a single five wicket haul of 5 for 42.

Mordaunt left Sussex at the end of the 1960 season. He played his final first-class match in 1964 for Marylebone Cricket Club against Ireland. With the MCC he also toured North America in 1959, South America in 1964–65, and North America again in 1967.

In 1964 Mordaunt joined the minor county Berkshire, and made his Minor Counties Championship debut against Devon. From 1964 to 1974, he played 40 Minor Counties Championship matches for Berkshire. He made his List A debut for Berkshire against Somerset in the 1st round of the 1965 Gillette Cup, scoring 60, including four sixes off the bowling of Bill Alley, and winning the man of the match award. He played three further one-day matches for the county, against Hertfordshire in the 1st round of the 1966 Gillette Cup, against Gloucestershire in the 2nd round of the same tournament, and finally against Hertfordshire in the 1976 Gillette Cup. In his four one-day matches he scored 144 runs at an average of 36.00, with two half-centuries and a highest score of 60. With the ball he took three wickets at an average of 44.00, with best figures of 3/24. He represented Old Wellingtonians in the Cricketer Cup between 1967 and 1986.

== Main career ==
Between 1955 and 1957 Mordaunt served in the Royal Northumberland Fusiliers. He became a schoolteacher in Oxford in 1958. He returned to his old school, Wellington College, in 1963 to teach mathematics.

Mordaunt was also a noted expeditioner, leading three Royal Geographical Schools Expeditions to the Arctic and, in 1983, a Royal Geographical Society expedition through Nepal to the base of Annapurna.

He died on 28 November 2020 at the age of 83.

== Family ==
Mordaunt married Dr Catharine Hilary Mayne in 1990. His grandfather, Gerald Mordaunt, and his great-grandfather, John Mordaunt, both played first-class cricket.
