= William Henry Wylde (civil servant) =

British civil servant (1819–1909)

William Henry Wylde (1819–1909) was a British civil servant of the Foreign Office, where he was head of the Commercial, Consular, and Slave Trade Departments.

== Life ==
He was the son of William Wylde. His father was British Commissioner in Spain during the First Carlist War, and Wylde was there as his secretary in 1836. In 1846–7 his father was sent to the Patuleia in Portugal, and Wylde accompanied him, with also his brother Robert Gervas Wylde.

Joining the Foreign Office in 1839, Wylde's initial grade was supernumerary clerk; he was promoted to assistant clerk in 1859. He was head of the Commercial and Consular Department from 1865, retiring in 1880.

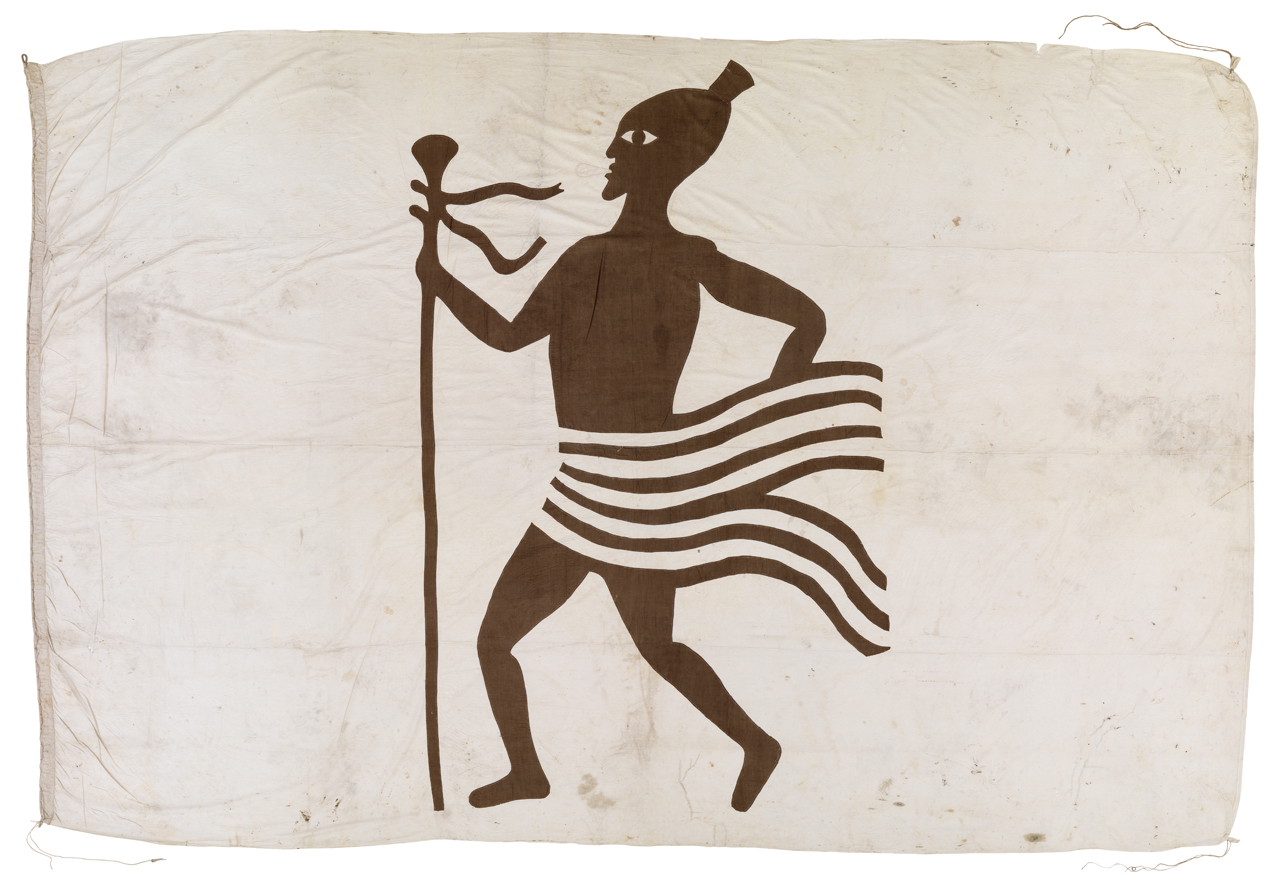
Flag of an African slave trader, presented to William Henry Wylde, involved in the 1865 commission to revise Slave Trade Instructions, by Capt. Arthur Parry Eardley Wilmot R.N.

Wylde was created C.M.G. in 1880. In 1884 he read part of the 1883 diary of Henry Edward O'Neill, consul in Mozambique, to the Royal Geographical Society, of which he had become a Fellow in 1863.

== Views ==
Wylde was a member of the Anti-Slavery Society. He gave evidence to the parliamentary committee on West Africa in 1865. In 1873 he pressed for the continuation of payments to Masaba of the Bida Emirate, as positive for British trade prospects in the area. He was a proponent for the view that the British had duties in West Africa, against those for retrenchment and a reduction of commitments.

As head the slave trading department of the Foreign Office, Wylde argued against making a treaty with the Ottoman Empire to allow the Royal Navy to search Ottoman vessels for enslaved people, on the grounds that in these cases distinguishing them from other passengers was difficult. In the early 1870s he considered that the extent of the British consular presence in the Levant was justified in terms of keeping the peace there.

== Family ==
Wylde married in 1846 Elizabeth Mary Massy, daughter of Richard Massy. They had four sons and three daughters. The sons included Augustus Blandy Wylde (1849–1909), African traveller and agent for the Sudan Trading Company.

The eldest daughter, Wilhelmina Elizabeth, married Joseph Maghull Yates in 1873, and was mother of Humphrey Yates. The second daughter Mary Ella married Charles Molesworth Tuke in 1883. Everard William Wylde (1847–1911), the eldest son, married in 1872 Florence Evans, daughter of the Rev. Lewis Evans of Sandbach.
