= Charles Mordaunt =

Charles Mordaunt may refer to:

- Charles Mordaunt, 3rd Earl of Peterborough and 1st Earl of Monmouth, English soldier
- Charles Mordaunt, 4th Earl of Peterborough and 2nd Earl of Monmouth
- Sir Charles Mordaunt, 6th Baronet, MP Warwickshire
- Sir Charles Mordaunt, 8th Baronet, MP Warwickshire
- Sir Charles Mordaunt, 10th Baronet, MP South Warwickshire
