= Henry Snow =

English cricketer

Henry John Snow (February 1811 – 20 January 1874) was an English cricketer with amateur status who was associated with Marylebone Cricket Club (MCC) and made his debut in 1830.

Snow was educated at Eton and St John's College, Cambridge. After graduating he became a Church of England priest and was vicar of Bibury with Winson, Gloucestershire, from 1843 until his death in 1874.

== Bibliography ==
- Haygarth, Arthur (1996) [1862]. Scores & Biographies, Volume 1 (1744–1826). Kennington: Frederick Lillywhite. ISBN 978-19-00592-23-9.
- Haygarth, Arthur (1997) [1862]. Scores & Biographies, Volume 2 (1827–1840). Kennington: Frederick Lillywhite. ISBN 978-19-00592-23-9.
