= John Mordaunt =

John Mordaunt may refer to:

- John Mordaunt (speaker) (d. 1504), Tudor politician and Speaker of the House of Commons
- John Mordaunt, 1st Baron Mordaunt (d. 1562)
- John Mordaunt, 2nd Baron Mordaunt (1508–1571)
- John Mordaunt, 1st Earl of Peterborough (1600–1643)
- John Mordaunt, 1st Viscount Mordaunt (1626–1675), Royalist conspirator
- Sir John Mordaunt, 5th Baronet (bef. 1649–1721)
- John Mordaunt, Viscount Mordaunt (c. 1681–1710)
- John Mordaunt (British Army officer) (1697–1780), English general and Member of Parliament
- John Mordaunt (MP) (c. 1709–1767), British soldier and Member of Parliament
- Sir John Mordaunt, 7th Baronet (1734–1806)
- Sir John Mordaunt, 9th Baronet (1808–1845)
- Colonel John Mordaunt, in Lucknow and the subject of Colonel Mordaunt's Cock Match
