= Chiswick House =

Neo-Palladian villa in Chiswick, London

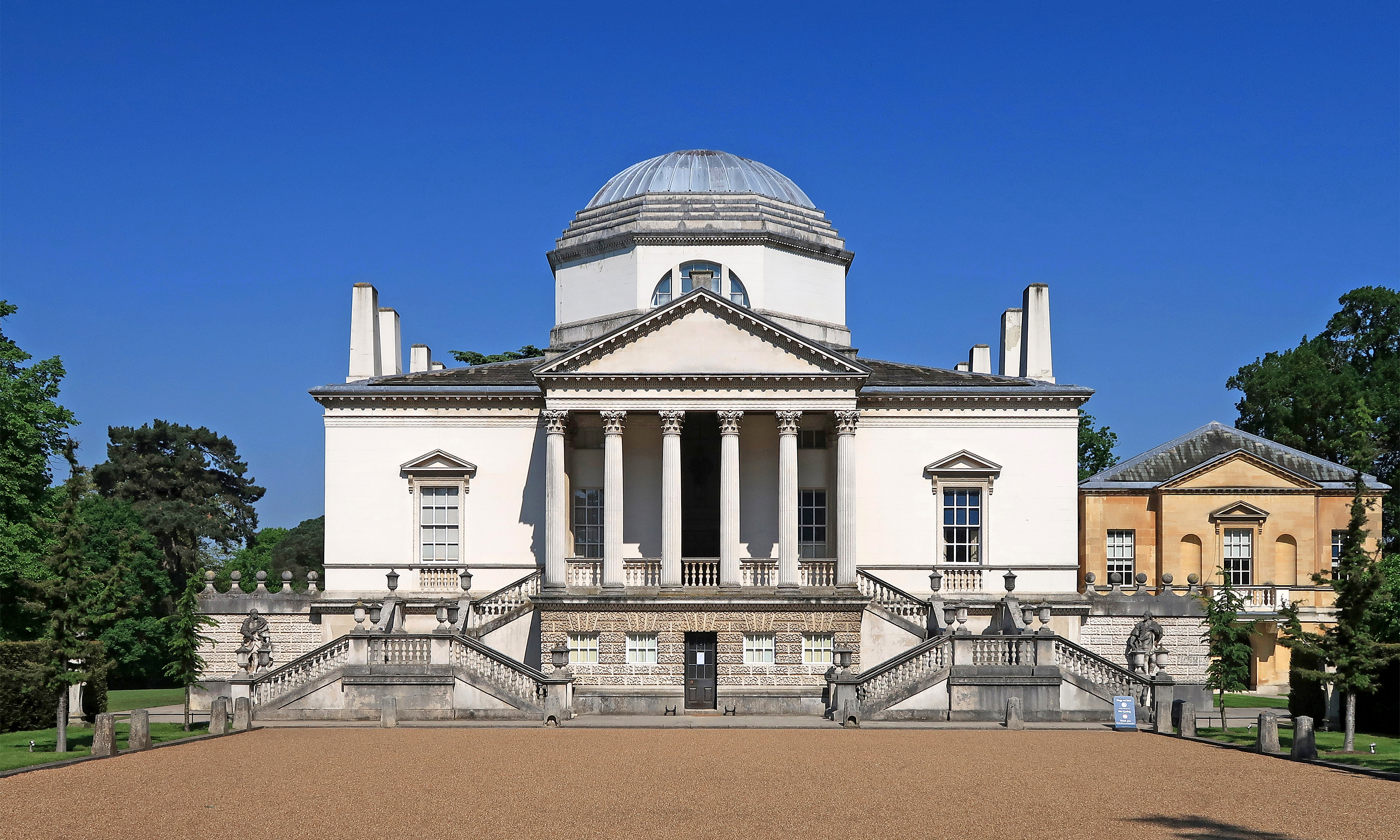
- View from forecourt

- Location within London Borough of Hounslow

General information
- Architectural style: Neo-Palladian
- Location: Chiswick, London, England
- Coordinates: 51°29′02″N 0°15′31″W
- Completed: 1729
- Owner: English Heritage

Design and construction
- Architect: Richard Boyle, 3rd Earl of Burlington

Website
- chiswickhouseandgardens.org.uk

Chiswick House is a Neo-Palladian style villa in the Chiswick district of London, England. A "glorious" example of Neo-Palladian architecture in west London, the house was designed and built by Richard Boyle, 3rd Earl of Burlington (1694–1753), and completed in 1729. The house and garden occupy 26.33 hectares (65.1 acres). The garden was created mainly by the architect and landscape designer William Kent, and it is one of the earliest examples of the English landscape garden.

After the death of the 3rd Earl of Burlington in 1753, and the subsequent deaths of his last surviving daughter (Charlotte Boyle) in 1754 and his widow in 1758, the property was ceded to William Cavendish, 4th Duke of Devonshire, Charlotte's husband. After William's death in 1764, the villa passed to his and Charlotte's orphaned young son, William Cavendish, 5th Duke of Devonshire. His wife, Georgiana Spencer, a prominent and controversial figure in fashion and politics whom he married in 1774, used the house as a retreat and as a Whig stronghold for many years; it was where Charles James Fox died in 1806. Prime Minister George Canning also died there in 1827, in a bedroom in the John White wing buildings.

During the 19th century, the house fell into decline and was rented out by the Cavendish family. It was used as a mental hospital, the Chiswick Asylum, from 1892. In 1929, the 9th Duke of Devonshire sold Chiswick House to Middlesex County Council, and it became a fire station. The villa suffered damage during World War II, and in 1944, a V-2 rocket damaged one of the two wings, which were both demolished in 1956. Today, the house is a Grade I listed building and is maintained by English Heritage.

== History ==
=== Early history (c. 1610–1682) ===
The original Chiswick House was a Jacobean house owned by Sir Edward Wardour, and possibly built by his father. It is dated c. 1610 in a late 17th-century engraving of the Chiswick House estate by Jan Kip and Leonard Knyff, and was constructed with four sides around an open courtyard. Wardour sold the house in 1624 to Robert Carr, 1st Earl of Somerset. The house was quite large: in the 1664 Hearth Tax documents it is recorded as having 33 fireplaces. The house was at the south end of the Royalist line in the Battle of Turnham Green (1641), during the First English Civil War. The house was purchased by Charles Boyle, 3rd Viscount Dungarvan in 1682.

=== Boyle family (1682–1758) ===
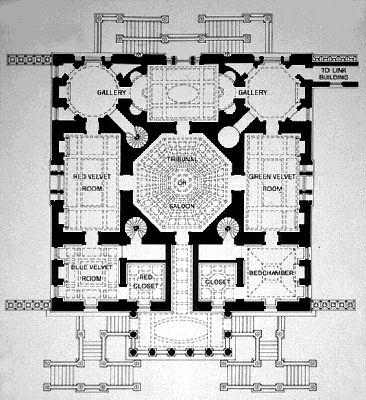
Plan of Chiswick House

The Jacobean house was used by the Boyle family as a summer retreat from their central London home, Burlington House. After a fire in 1725, Richard Boyle, 3rd Earl of Burlington (Lord Burlington), then head of the family, decided to build a new "villa" to the west of the old Chiswick House.

During his trip to Italy in 1719, Burlington had acquired a passion for Palladian architecture. He had not closely inspected Roman ruins or made detailed drawings on the sites in Italy; he relied on Palladio and Scamozzi as his interpreters of the classic tradition. Another source of his inspiration were drawings he collected, including those of Palladio himself, which had belonged to Inigo Jones and his pupil John Webb. According to Howard Colvin, "Burlington's mission was to reinstate in Augustan England the canons of Roman architecture as described by Vitruvius, exemplified by its surviving remains, and practised by Palladio, Scamozzi and Jones."

Burlington, himself a talented amateur architect and (in the words of Horace Walpole) "Apollo of the Arts", designed the villa with the aid of William Kent, who also took a leading role in designing the gardens. Burlington built the villa with enough space to house his art collection, regarded as containing "some of the best pictures in Europe", and his more select pieces of furniture, some of which was purchased on his first Grand Tour of Europe in 1714. Construction of the villa took place between 1726 and 1729.

After Burlington's death in 1753, his wife, Lady Dorothy Savile, and daughter, Charlotte, who had married William Cavendish, 4th Duke of Devonshire in 1748, inherited the house. Charlotte died in December 1754, and Lady Burlington died in September 1758. Several views of Burlington's house were made by the architect-draughtsman John Donowell around this time.

=== Cavendish family (1758–1929) ===
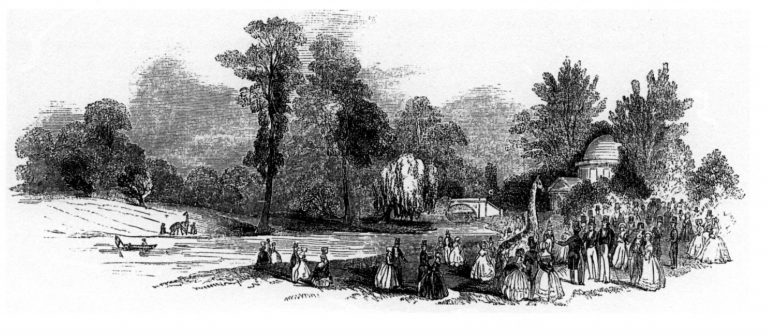
The 6th Duke of Devonshire's garden party for Tsar Nicholas of Russia and 700 guests, with giraffes in the park, from The Illustrated London News, 15 June 1844

After the death of Lady Burlington in 1758, the villa and gardens passed to the Cavendish family. William Cavendish died in 1764, leaving the property to his son William, the 5th Duke of Devonshire. In 1774, William married Lady Georgiana Spencer, the Duchess of Devonshire, who enjoyed spending time at Chiswick which she referred to as her "earthly paradise". She regularly invited members of the Whig party to the house for tea parties in the garden. In 1788 the Cavendish family demolished the Jacobean house and hired architect John White to add two wings to the villa to increase the amount of accommodation. The Duchess was responsible for the building of the Classical Bridge in 1774, designed by the architect James Wyatt, and the planting of roses on the walls of the new wings and the sides of the buildings. She died in 1806.

In 1813, a 300 feet (91 m) conservatory was built by Samuel Ware, with the purpose of housing exotic fruits and camellias. > Gardener Lewis Kennedy built an Italian inspired geometric garden around the conservatory. In 1827, after a rapid decline in health, Tory Prime Minister George Canning died in the same room where Charles James Fox had died in 1806.

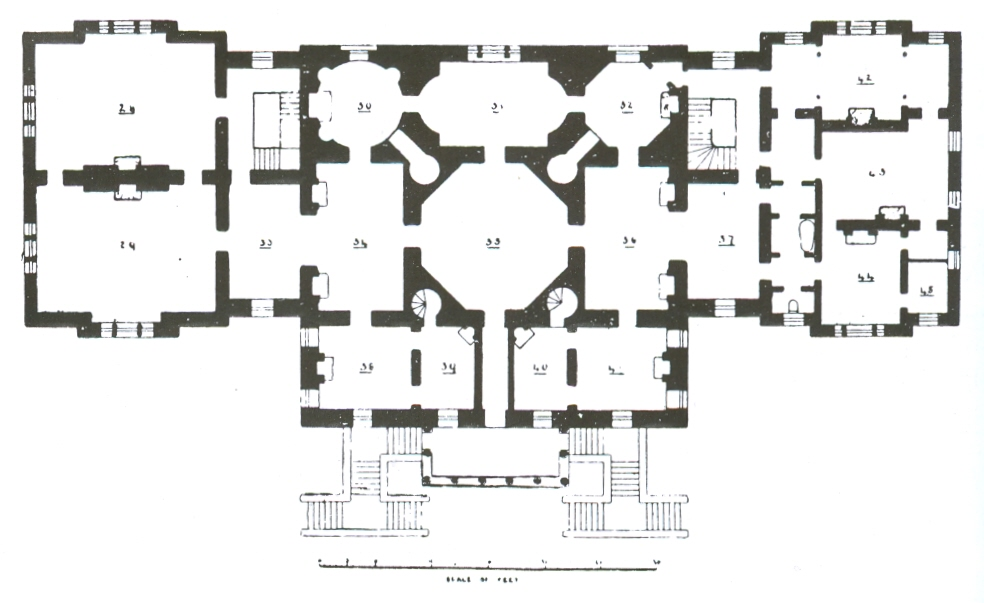
Floor plan, showing the wings used for the patients of Chiswick Asylum, now removed

Between 1862 and 1892 the villa was rented by the Cavendish family to a number of successive tenants, including the Duchess of Sutherland in 1867, the Prince of Wales in the 1870s, and John Crichton-Stuart, 3rd Marquess of Bute, patron of the architect William Burges, from 1881 to 1892.

=== Chiswick Asylum (1892–1928) ===
From 1892, the 9th Duke of Devonshire rented the villa to Doctors Thomas Seymour and Charles Molesworth Tuke (sons of Thomas Harrington Tuke), and it was used by them as a mental hospital, the Chiswick Asylum, for wealthy male and female patients until 1928. The asylum was praised for its relatively compassionate approach to its inmates. The wings of the house used for the asylum were demolished in the 1950s so little now remains of this use, except in archival records. In 1897, the two sphinxes on the main gate were removed to Green Park during the celebrations of the Diamond Jubilee of Queen Victoria. They were never returned.

=== Public ownership (1929–present) ===
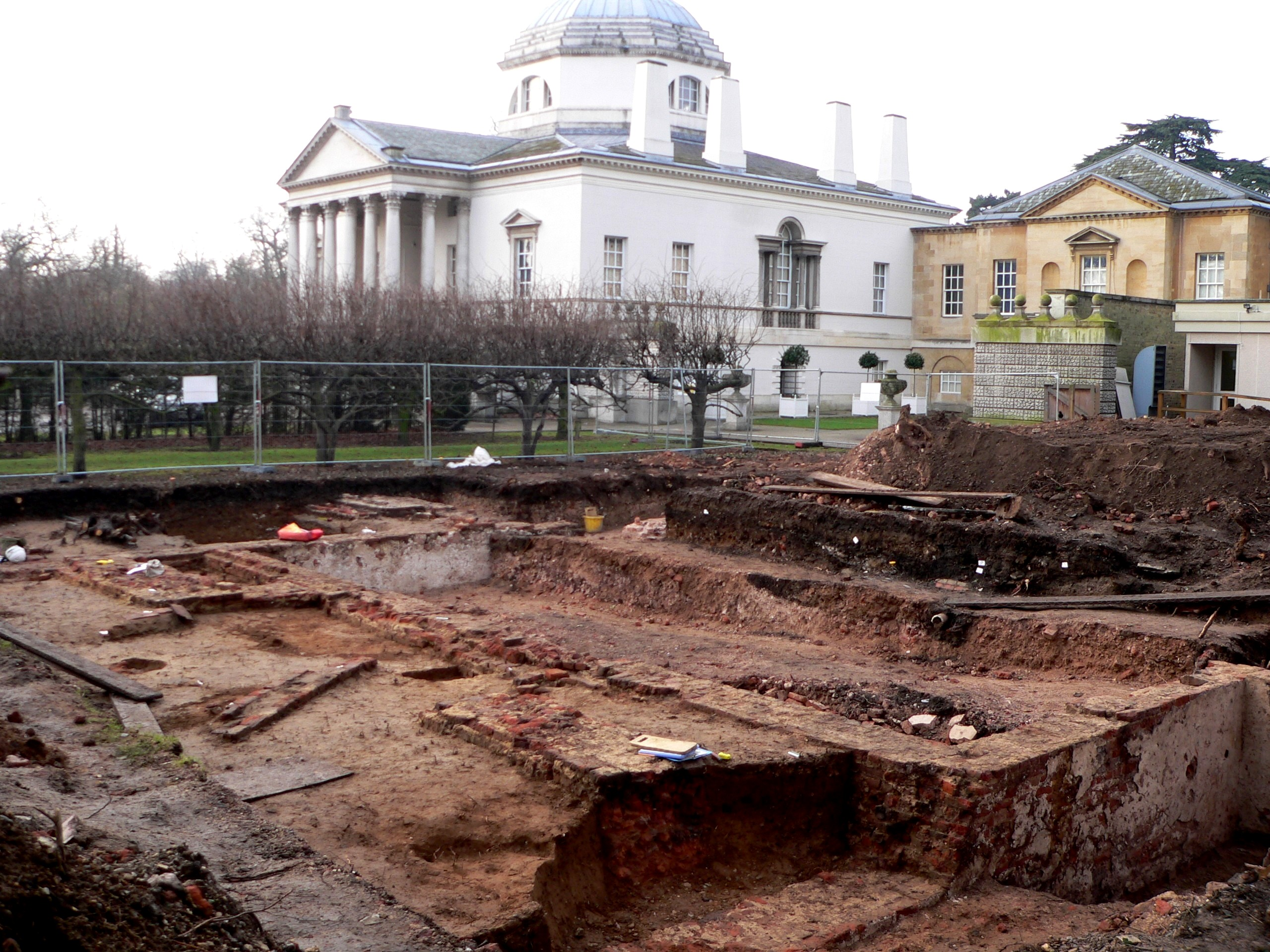
English Heritage archaeologists uncover the substantial remains of the old Jacobean house in a 2008 dig.

The 9th Duke of Devonshire sold Chiswick House to Middlesex County Council in 1929, the purchase price being met in part by contributions from public subscribers, including King George V. The villa became a fire station during World War II, and suffered damage; vibration from the bombing of Chiswick brought down the plasterwork in the Upper Tribunal, and on 8 September 1944 a V-2 rocket damaged one of the two wings. The wings were removed in 1956.

In 1948, extensive lobbying from the newly created Georgian Group prevented it from being destroyed. The house came under the aegis of the Ministry of Works and subsequently of English Heritage.

Hounslow Council and English Heritage formed the Chiswick House and Gardens Trust in 2005 to unify the management of the villa and gardens. The trust took over the administration for the villa and gardens in July 2010, following the completion of the restoration works. A Heritage Lottery Fund grant was complemented by approximately £4 million from other sources, for restoration of the gardens in 2007. The garden is open to the public from dawn until dusk without charge.

== Architecture ==
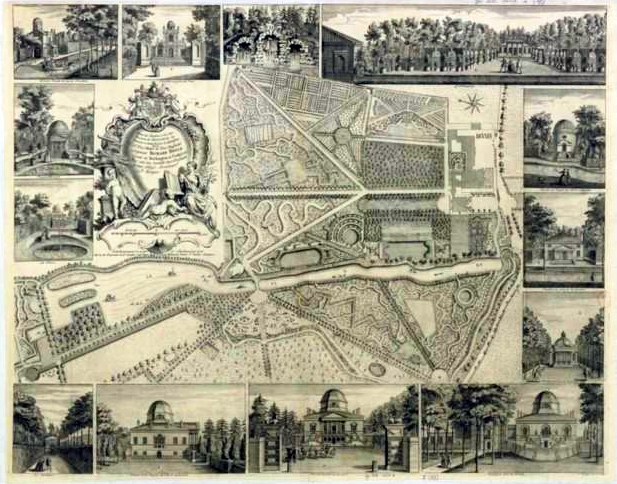
1736 engraving by John Rocque of the garden layout with sketches of the house

Chiswick House was an attempt by Lord Burlington to create a Roman villa, rather than a Renaissance pastiche, situated in a symbolic Roman garden. Chiswick Villa is inspired in part by several buildings of the 16th-century Italian architects Andrea Palladio and his assistant Vincenzo Scamozzi. The house is often said to be directly inspired by Palladio's Villa Capra "La Rotonda" near Vicenza, as architect Colen Campbell had offered Lord Burlington a design for a villa closely based on the Villa Capra for his use at Chiswick. However, although this was clearly influential, Lord Burlington rejected this design; it was subsequently used at Mereworth Castle, Kent.

Lord Burlington's library list at Chiswick shows that he was not restricted to the influence of Andrea Palladio. He owned books by influential Italian Renaissance architects such as Sebastiano Serlio and Leon Battista Alberti, and his library contained books by French architects, sculptors, illustrators and architectural theorists like Jean Cotelle, Philibert de l'Orme, Abraham Bosse, Jean Bullant, Salomon de Caus, Roland Fréart de Chambray, Hugues Sambin, Antoine Desgodetz, and John James's translation of Claude Perrault's Treatise of the Five Orders. Whether Palladio's work inspired Chiswick or not, the Renaissance architect exerted an important influence on Lord Burlington through his plans and reconstructions of lost Roman buildings; many of these, unpublished and little known, were purchased by Burlington on his second Grand Tour and housed in the Blue Velvet Room, which served as his study. These reconstructions were the source for many of the varied geometric shapes within Burlington's Villa, including the use of the octagon, circle and rectangle (with apses). Burlington's use of Roman sources can be seen in features including the steep-pitched dome of the villa, which is derived from the Pantheon in Rome. However, the source for the octagonal form of the dome, the Upper Tribunal, Lower Tribunal and cellar at Chiswick may be Scamozzi's Rocca Pisana near Vicenza. Burlington may also have been influenced in his choice of octagon by the drawings of the Renaissance architect Sebastiano Serlio (1475–1554), or by Roman buildings of antiquity (for example, Lord Burlington owned Andrea Palladio's drawings of the octagonal mausoleum at Diocletian's Palace, Split in modern Croatia).

The brick-built Villa's façade is faced in Portland stone, with a small amount of stucco. The finely carved Corinthian capitals on the projecting six-column portico, carved by John Boson, are derived from the Temple of Castor and Pollux in Rome. The inset door, projecting plinth and 'v'-necked rusticated vermiculation (resembling tufa) were all derived from the base of Trajan's Column. The short sections of crenellated wall with ball finials which extend out either side of the villa were symbolic of medieval (or Roman) fortified town walls, and were inspired by their use by Palladio at his church of San Giorgio Maggiore in Venice and by Inigo Jones (1573–1652) (Palladio produced woodcuts of the Villa Foscari with crenellated sections of walls in his I quattro libri dell'architettura in 1570, yet they were never built). To reinforce this link, two full-length statues of Palladio and Jones are positioned in front of these sections of wall. Palladio's influence is also felt in the general cubic form of the villa with its central hall with other rooms leading off its axis. The villa is a half cube of 70 feet (21 m) by 70 feet (21 m) by 35 feet (11 m). The house when built was described by John, Lord Hervey as "Too small to live in, and too big to hang to a watch". John Clerk of Penicuik described it as "Rather curious than convenient", while Horace Walpole called it "the beautiful model".

== Gardens ==
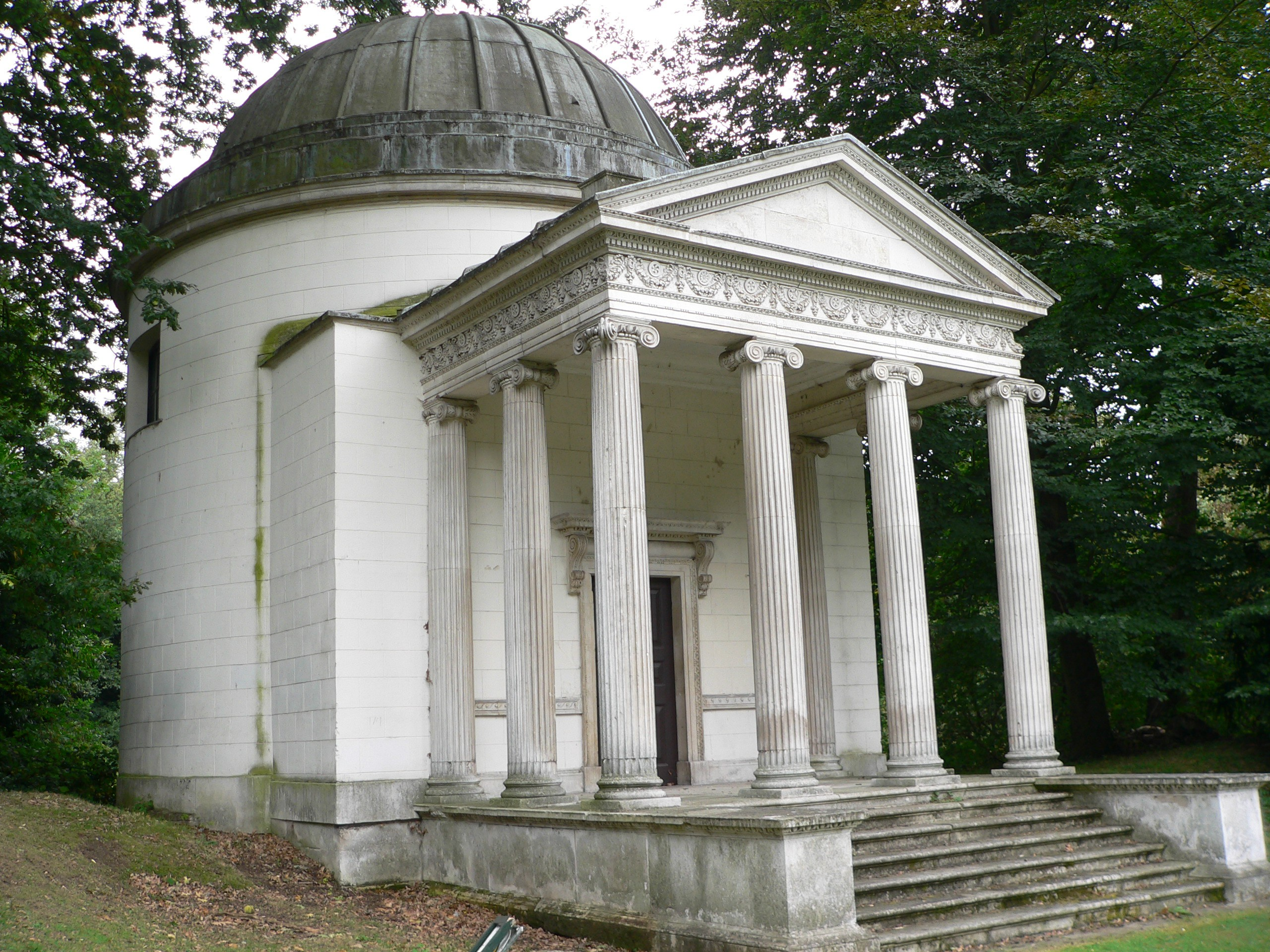
Portico of the Ionic Temple in the Orange Tree Garden

The gardens at Chiswick were an attempt to recreate a garden of ancient Rome, such as the Emperor Hadrian's Villa Adriana at Tivoli. From the 1720s, Burlington and Kent experimented with new designs, incorporating elements such as a Ha-ha, classical garden buildings, statues, groves, faux Egyptian objects, bowling greens, winding walks, cascades and water features. A theatre of hedges known as an exedra was designed by William Kent and originally displayed ancient statues of three unknown Roman gentlemen. The lawn at the rear of the house was created by 1745 and planted with young Cedar of Lebanon trees which alternate with stone funerary urns designed by William Kent. Placed between the urns and the Cedar of Lebanon are three more sphinxes orientated to face the rising sun.

A lake was created around 1727 by widening the Bollo Brook. The excess soil was heaped up behind William Kent's cascade to produce an elevated walkway for people to admire the gardens and a view of the nearby River Thames. A gateway designed by Inigo Jones in 1621 at Beaufort House in Chelsea (home of Sir Hans Sloane) was bought and removed by Lord Burlington and rebuilt in the gardens at Chiswick in 1738. The Classic Bridge beyond the Orange Tree Garden was built for Georgiana Spencer in 1774 to the design of James Wyatt.

The kitchen garden was created in 1682 as part of an adjoining property. Its ownership changed several times, and the garden fell into disrepair. In 2005 it was restored by local volunteers of the Chiswick House Kitchen Garden charity. In 2009 the charity was awarded a grant from the Big Lottery Fund Local Food Scheme, which it had transferred to the Chiswick House and Gardens Trust to fund a community gardener and to assist with the ongoing operation of the kitchen garden.

== Freemasonry ==
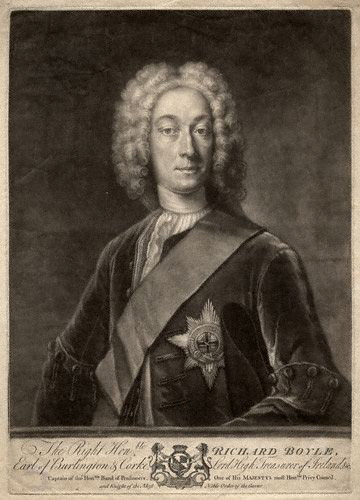
Lord Burlington

Chiswick House has been linked with Freemasonry, and is believed by some scholars to have functioned as a private Masonic Lodge or Temple (unaffiliated to Grand Lodge), given that many of the ceiling paintings by William Kent in the Gallery and the Red, Blue and Summer Parlour Rooms contain iconography of a strong Masonic, Hermetic, and possible Jacobite character. The proportions of several of the upstairs rooms also have significance in relation to biblical buildings important in Freemasonry. Lord Burlington's status as an important Freemason is indicated by his inclusion in the Freemason's Pocket Companion of 1736 and in a poem in James Anderson's Constitutions of the Free-Masons of 1723 where he is linked to an illustrious line of personalities important in Masonic lore. Pat Rogers has argued (following the original research of Jane Clark) that Chiswick House was a symbolic temple, based on so-called Royal Arch Freemasonry, involving a Hermetic intervention designed to heal the sufferings of the exiled Jews.

Lord Burlington's handwritten list of titles in his library at Chiswick also shows that he supported a large number of publications by Freemasons. After completion of the villa in 1729, Burlington later provided inspiration to other Masonic architects for numerous other buildings, such as Thomas Coke, 1st Earl of Leicester at Holkham Hall, Norfolk Charles Lennox, 2nd Duke of Richmond, at Goodwood House, and the Mansion House, nicknamed the "Egyptian Hall" for its columns.

== Notable guests ==
Visitors to the property have included Queen Victoria and Prince Albert of Saxe-Coburg; the composer George Frideric Handel; and the political leader Charles James Fox.

On 20 May 1966, the Beatles visited Chiswick House to shoot promotional films for both sides of their latest 45 RPM single, "Paperback Writer" and "Rain". There are scenes shot in the conservatory, in the walled garden and by the exedra.

== Events ==
Since the restoration of the gardens, a variety of seasonal events have been held in the gardens of Chiswick House each year, including a Camellia show, open days in the walled kitchen garden, a circus, and a magic lantern festival.

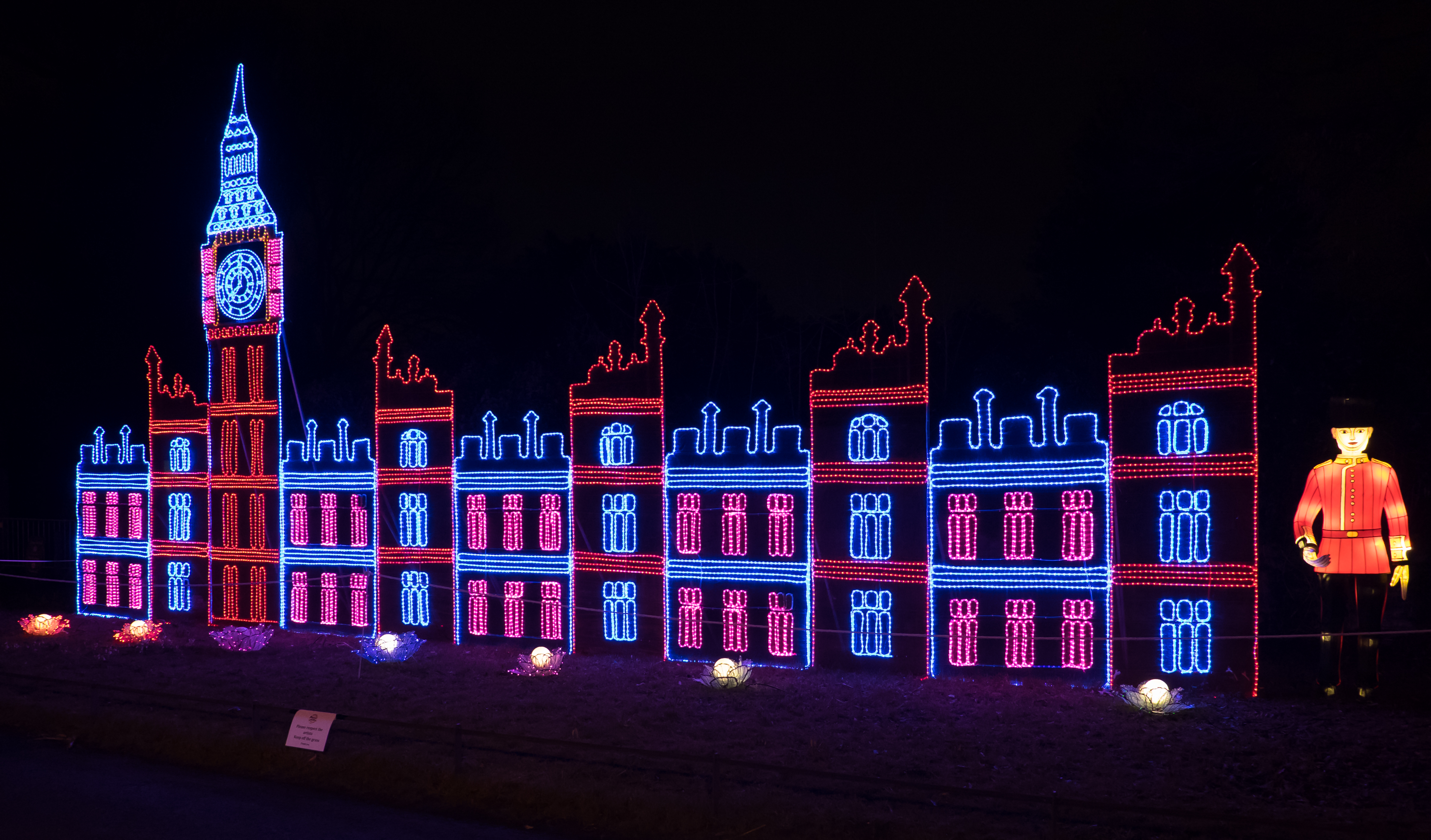
Sculpture of the Palace of Westminster at a magic lantern festival in the gardens

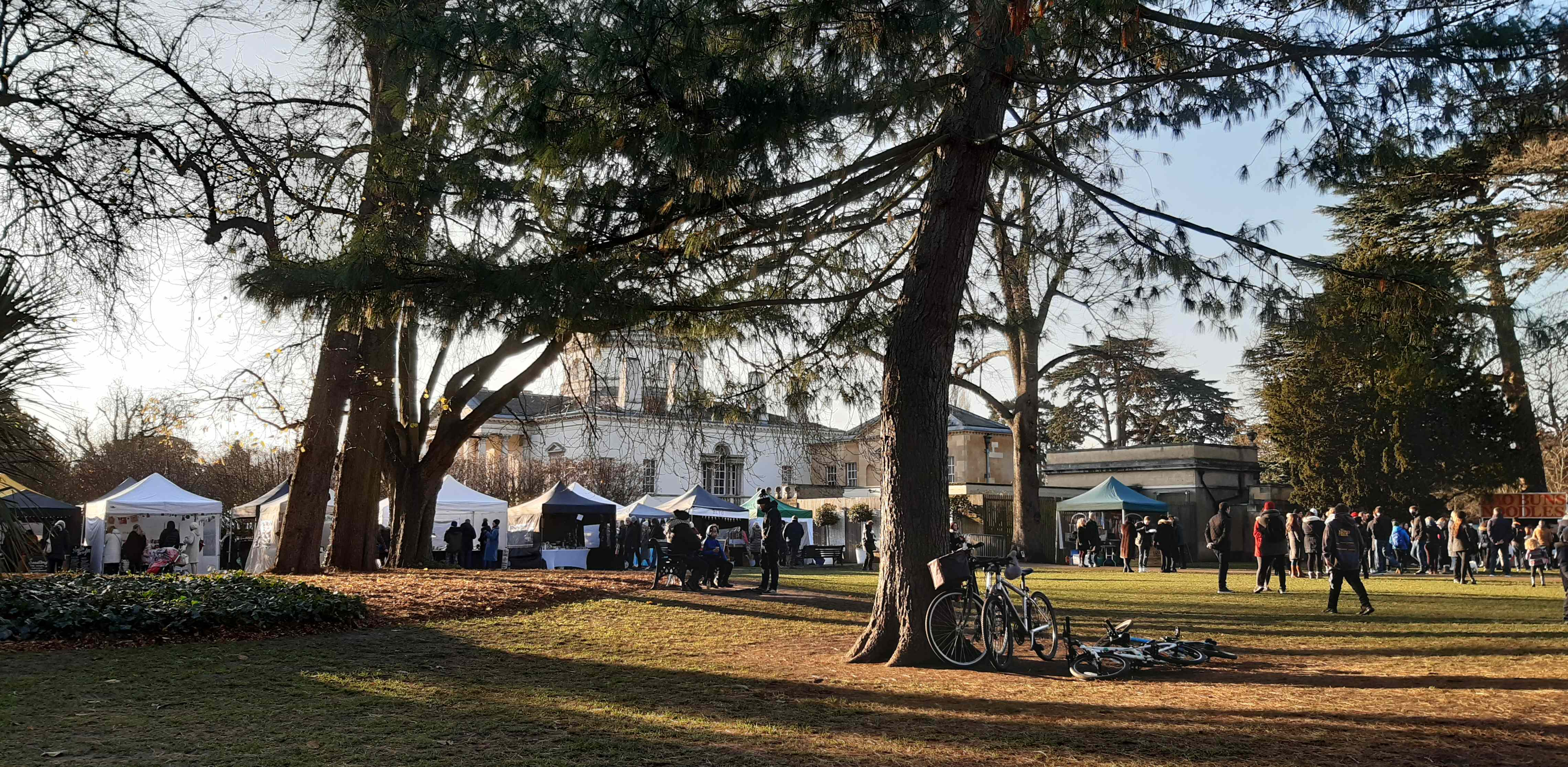
Artisan food market
