= Eustace Mordaunt =

English cricketer

Personal information
- Full name: Eustace Charles Mordaunt
- Born: 6 September 1870; Wellesbourne Hastings, Warwickshire
- Died: 21 June 1938 (aged 67); Marylebone, London
- Batting: Right-handed
- Bowling: Right-arm fast
- Relatives: John Mordaunt (father); Henry Mordaunt (brother); Gerald Mordaunt (brother); Osbert Mordaunt (uncle)

Domestic team information
- Years: Team
- 1891–1894: Middlesex
- 1896–1897: Kent
- FC debut: 21 May 1891 Middlesex v Kent
- Last FC: 6 June 1904 I Zingari v Gentlemen of England

Career statistics
Competition	First-class
Matches	11
Runs scored	132
Batting average	7.33
100s/50s	0/0
Top score	21
Balls bowled	278
Wickets	4
Bowling average	34.00
5 wickets in innings	0
10 wickets in match	0
Best bowling	1/4
Catches/stumpings	3/–
- Source: CricInfo, 21 December 2018

Eustace Charles Mordaunt (6 September 1870 – 21 June 1938) was an English amateur cricketer who played for Kent County Cricket Club and Middlesex County Cricket Club at the turn of the 20th century.

Mordaunt was born at Wellesbourne Hastings in Warwickshire, the son of John Mordaunt who had played cricket for Marylebone Cricket Club (MCC). He was educated at Wellington College where he was in the cricket XI from 1887 to 1889, leading the school averages in his final season, and captaining the team in 1888. He played for Hampshire County Cricket Club in 1887 whilst he was at school at a time when the county did not have first-class cricket status.

Mordaunt played in 11 first-class matches. He made his first-class debut for Middlesex in May 1891 playing against Kent at Lord's. He played four times for the county between 1891 and 1894 before moving to play for Kent between 1896 and 1897, making six appearances for the county. His final first-class match was for I Zingari in 1904. He played in minor cricket for I Zingari, MCC, Band of Brothers, and Free Foresters. His brothers henry and Gerry both played first-class cricket.

He remained closely associated with Wellington College throughout his life and served as a Governor of the college. Mordaunt died at Marylebone in London in 1938 aged 67.

== Bibliography ==
- Carlaw, Derek (2020). Kent County Cricketers, A to Z: Part One (1806–1914) (PDF). Cardiff: ACS.
