= Francis Portman =

English cricketer (1878–1905)

Francis John Portman (24 March 1878 – 2 May 1905) played first-class cricket for Somerset in 1897 and 1899. He was born at Corton Denham, Somerset and died at Ajmer, India.

The nephew of Henry Portman, 2nd Viscount Portman, he was educated at Radley College. As a cricketer, he was a lower-order right-handed batsman and a right-arm fast-medium bowler. In 1896, he played two Minor Counties matches for Berkshire. He played in just two first-class matches, both for Somerset against Oxford University, with two wickets for 38 runs in the Oxford first innings in the 1899 match his best bowling return.
