= Sir Henry Mordaunt, 12th Baronet =

English cricketer and educator

Sir Henry Mordaunt
Personal information
- Full name: Henry John Mordaunt
- Born: 12 July 1867; Westminster, London, England
- Died: 15 January 1939 (aged 71); Westminster, London, England
- Height: 6 ft 0 in (1.83 m)
- Batting: Right-handed
- Bowling: Right-arm fast
- Relatives: John Mordaunt (father); Eustace Mordaunt (brother); Gerald Mordaunt (brother); Osbert Mordaunt (uncle)

Domestic team information
- Years: Team
- 1885: Hampshire
- 1888–1889: Cambridge University
- 1889–1893: Middlesex
- 1896: Marylebone Cricket Club

Career statistics
Competition	First-class
Matches	27
Runs scored	729
Batting average	15.51
100s/50s	1/3
Top score	127
Balls bowled	2,400
Wickets	49
Bowling average	21.16
5 wickets in innings	1
10 wickets in match	0
Best bowling	5/17
Catches/stumpings	12/–
- Source: Cricinfo, 17 February 2010

Sir Henry John Mordaunt, 12th Baronet (12 July 1867 – 15 January 1939) was an English first-class cricketer and educator. Mordaunt played first-class cricket from 1885 to 1896, largely at varsity level for Cambridge University Cricket Club. He was later involved in education, spending twenty years as the Chief Clerk of the London County Council Education Committee.

== First-class cricket and career in education ==
The son of the shipbuilder and cricketer John Mordaunt, he was born at Westminster in July 1867. He was educated at Eton College, where he was a noted sportsman. He played for and captained the college cricket team, played the Eton wall game, and won the quarter mile race in 1885. In the summer break following his penultimate year (1885) at Eton, Mordaunt played first-class cricket for Hampshire against Somerset at Southampton. From Eton, he matriculated to King's College, Cambridge. There, he played first-class cricket for Cambridge University Cricket Club in 1888 and 1889, making fifteen appearances, including playing in both University Matches against Oxford University in those seasons. An all-rounder in these, he scored 600 runs at an average of 23.07; he made one century, a score of 127 which came against Oxford University in 1889, which at the time was the third-highest individual score in The University Match. With his right-arm fast bowling, he took 38 wickets at a bowling average of 20.39, with best figures of 4 for 29. Shortly after completing his studies at Cambridge in 1889, Mordaunt also made a single first-class appearance for an England XI against the touring Australians at Hastings.

Beginning in 1889, Mordaunt began playing for Middlesex and the following season he played in the first ever edition of the County Championship, making three appearances. Alongside playing in the County Championship in 1890, Mordaunt also made one first-class appearance apiece for a Cambridge University Past and Present team against the touring Australians at Leyton, and for I Zingari against the Gentlemen of England at the Scarborough Festival. In the latter, he took his only five wicket haul in first-class cricket with figures of 5 for 17 in the Gentlemen's second innings. Mordaunt was appointed a master at Felsted School in 1890, before being appointed a master at Clifton College, a post he held in 1891 and 1892. He vacated his mastership to go into business, which he did until 1898. During this period, he played an additional three first-class matches for Middlesex in the 1893 County Championship. A final first-class appearance came in 1896, for the Marylebone Cricket Club against Cambridge University at Fenner's. Described by Wisden as "well built" and "a powerful driver with good style", he scored 729 runs at an average of 15.51 from 27 first-class matches. With the ball, he took 49 wickets at a bowling average of 21.16.

After the end of his business endeavours, Mordaunt returned to education. He was a junior examiner to the Board of Education from 1898 to 1904, and followed this by serving as Chief Clerk of the London County Council Education Committee from 1904 to 1924. He became the 12th Baronet of the Mordaunt Baronets in 1934, following the death of his cousin Sir Osbert Mordaunt. Mordaunt died at Westminster in January 1939. He was unmarried at the time of his death and was thus succeeded in the baronetcy by his cousin, Sir Nigel Mordaunt. Both of his brothers, Eustace and Gerald, played first-class cricket.

Baronetage of England
Preceded by Sir Osbert Mordaunt	Baronet (of Massingham Parva); 1934–1939	Succeeded by Sir Nigel John Mordaunt, 13th Baronet
