= Gerald Mordaunt =

English cricketer

Personal information
- Full name: Gerald John Mordaunt
- Born: 20 January 1873; Wellesbourne Hastings, Warwickshire
- Died: 5 March 1959 (aged 86); Hayling Island, Hampshire
- Batting: Right-handed
- Bowling: Right-arm slow Slow left arm orthodox
- Relatives: John Mordaunt (father); Henry Mordaunt (brother); Eustace Mordaunt (brother); Osbert Mordaunt (uncle); David Mordaunt (grandson)

Domestic team information
- Years: Team
- 1893–1896: Oxford University
- 1895–1897: Kent
- FC debut: 15 June 1893 Oxford University v Lancashire
- Last FC: 9 May 1904 Gentlemen of England v Oxford University

Career statistics
Competition	First-class
Matches	60
Runs scored	2,675
Batting average	26.22
100s/50s	2/13
Top score	264*
Balls bowled	15
Wickets	0
Bowling average	–
5 wickets in innings	–
10 wickets in match	–
Best bowling	–
Catches/stumpings	72/–
- Source: CricInfo, 21 December 2018

Gerald John Mordaunt (20 January 1873 – 5 March 1959), sometimes known as Gerry Mordaunt, was an English amateur cricketer who played first-class cricket for Oxford University, Kent County Cricket Club, the Marylebone Cricket Club (MCC), the Gentlemen, and others between 1893 and 1904.

== Early life ==
Mordaunt was born at Wellesbourne Hastings in Warwickshire and educated at Wellington College and University College, Oxford. He played cricket at both school and university, captaining Wellington College for three years. He was in the Oxford team for the University Match against Cambridge for four seasons from 1893 to 1896 and was captain in 1895, when his team included three future captains of the England national cricket team, Warner, C. B. Fry and H. D. G. Leveson Gower. As well as playing cricket, Mordaunt won the Public Schools Racquets Challenge Cup in 1891 and won an athletics blue in long jump in 1896.

== Career ==
Mordaunt played as a right-handed middle-order batsman and was described in his Wisden obituary as "free-scoring batsman, specially skilled in off-side strokes". He was also noted for his fielding: Pelham Warner in an obituary of him in The Times claimed that he may never have dropped a catch. He made a total of 60 appearances in first-class cricket matches, including 34 for Oxford and 16 for Kent and played in three Gentlemen v Players matches between 1894 and 1895. He was awarded his Kent county cap in 1895.

He toured North America with Lord Hawke in 1894, playing in both matches against the Gentlemen of Philadelphia, and in 1895 made his highest score of 264 not out. This came in a match against Sussex in which 1,410 runs were scored, at the time a record for a three-day match, and was one of two centuries he scored in his first-class career.

Several members of Mordaunt's family also played first-class cricket. His brothers Henry and Eustace played for Middlesex and for other teams, his father, John Mordaunt, played for MCC and his grandson David Mordaunt was a Sussex and Minor Counties cricketer in the last days of amateurism in the 1950s.

Mordaunt was restricted by business commitments from playing county cricket more regularly. He died at Hayling Island in Hampshire in March 1959, at the age of 86.

== Bibliography ==
- Carlaw, Derek (2020). Kent County Cricketers, A to Z: Part One (1806–1914) (PDF). Cardiff: ACS.
