= Laurence Berkeley =

English politician (died 1458)

Sir Laurence Berkeley (died 20 May 1458) was an English politician. He represented Leicestershire in the parliaments of December 1421 and January 1431.

He was knighted before July 1417.

== Political career ==
He also served as commissioner of arrest in Leicestershire in May 1422; commissioner of array in January 1436; commissioner to assess a tax in January 1436; commissioner to raise royal loans in February 1436.

He also served as Sheriff of Warwickshire and Leicestershire from 5 November 1439 till 4 November 1440.

== Family ==
He was the son and heir of Sir John Berkeley. Before February 1404, he married Joan, the sister of Sir Robert Woodford and they had one son Sir Thomas Berkeley.
