= Flamville =

Flamville is a surname. Notable people with the surname include:

- William Flamville (c. 1325–c. 1396), English politician

== See also ==
- Aston Flamville
