= Biddulph (surname) =

Biddulph is a surname. Notable people with the surname include:

- Cyril Biddulph (1887–1918), Canadian actor
- Elizabeth Biddulph, Baroness Biddulph (1834–1916), English humanitarian, temperance leader; Woman of the Bedchamber to Queen Victoria
- Howard Biddulph (1935–2022), American political scientist
- John Biddulph (1840–1921), British soldier, author and naturalist
- John Burnet Biddulph (1796–1837), Cape Colony explorer and trader
- Ken Biddulph (1932–2003), English cricketer
- Lynne Biddulph (born 1968/1969), English cyclist
- Michael Biddulph, 1st Baron Biddulph (1834–1923), British banker and politician
- Michael Biddulph (British Army officer) (1823–1904), British Army officer and parliamentary official
- Sir Michael Biddulph, 2nd Baronet (c. 1652–1718), English politician
- Robert Biddulph (British Army officer) (1835–1918), British Army officer
- Robert Biddulph (MP) (1801–1864), British politician
- Sally Biddulph (born 1975), English television journalist
- Samuel Biddulph (1840–1876), English cricketer
- Steve Biddulph (born 1953), Australian author
- Sir Theophilus Biddulph, 1st Baronet (1612–1683), English politician
