= High Sheriff of Warwickshire =

Ceremonial officer of Warwickshire, England

This is a list of sheriffs and high sheriffs of the English county of Warwickshire.

The Sheriff is the oldest secular office under the Crown. Formerly the Sheriff was the principal law enforcement officer in the county but over the centuries most of the responsibilities associated with the post have been transferred elsewhere or are now defunct, so that its functions are now largely ceremonial. Under the provisions of the Local Government Act 1972, on 1 April 1974 the office previously known as Sheriff was retitled High Sheriff. The High Sheriff changes, by Warwickshire tradition, on Maundy Thursday.

For a period prior to the middle of the 16th century the Sheriff of Warwickshire was also the Sheriff of Leicestershire.

== Sheriffs ==
=== 11th and 12th centuries ===
- 1066 Ælfwine of Warwick
- 1070–1086: Robert d'Oilly
- 1086 William FitzCorbucion
- c.1121: Geoffrey de Clinton
- 1125–1128: Hugh de Warelville
- 1129: Richard Basset with Aubrey de Vere II
- 1154: Geoffrey Clinton
- 1155–1156: Robert fitz Hugh
- 1157: William de Beauchamp and Robert fitz Hardulph

From 1158 to 1566 the Sheriff of Warwickshire was also Sheriff of Leicestershire

- 1158: Bertram de Bulmer and Ralph Basset
- 1159: Ralph Basset
- 1160: William Basset
- 1161: Robert fitz Geoffrey and William Basset
- 1162: William Basset
- 1163: Ranulf de Glanvill and William Basset
- 1164–1168: William Basset of Sapcote
- 1169–1178: Bertram de Verdon
- 1179: Ranulf de Glanvill and Bertram de Verdon
- 1180–1186: Ranulf de Glanvill
- 1187–1189: Michael Belet
- 1190: Hugh Nonant, Bishop of Coventry
- 1191: Hugh Bardulf and Hugh Clarke
- 1192: Hugh Nonant, Gilbert de Segrave of Segrave and Reginald Basset (jointly)
- 1193: Reginald Basset
- 1194: Reginald Basset and Gilbert de Segrave
- 1195: Reginald Basset, Gilbert de Segrave and William d'Aubigni
- 1196: Reginald Basset
- 1197: Reginald Basset, Gilbert de Segrave and William d'Aubigni
- 1198: Robert Harecourt
- 1199: Reginald Basset
- 1200: Robert Harecourt

=== 13th century ===
- 1201: Robert Harecourt and Godfrey de Liege
- 1202: William de Cantelupe and Robert Poyer
- 1203: Robert Poyer
- 1204–1207: Hugh Chaucomber
- 1208–1209: Robert Roppest
- 1210: William de Cantelupo and Robert Poyer
- 1212–1215: Robert of Ropsley
- 1217: William de Cantelupo and Philip Kniton
- 1218–1219: Philip Kniton
- 1220: William de Cantelupo and William de Luditon
- 1221–1222: William de Luditon
- 1223: John Russell and John Winterborne
- 1224–1226: Robert Lupus
- 1227: William Stutevill and William Ascellis
- 1228: William Ascellis
- 1229: Stephen de Segrave and William Edmonds
- 1230–1231: William Edmonds
- 1232: Stephen de Segrave and John de Riparis
- 1233: Ralph Bray
- 1234: Ralph fitz Nicholas and Ralph Brewedon
- 1235: Ralph and William Erleg.
- 1236–1237: William de Lucy
- 1238: Hugh Pollier and Philip Ascett
- 1239–1246: Hugh Pollier
- 1247–1248: Baldwin Paunton
- 1249–1251: Philip Marmion
- 1252–1255: William Maunsel
- 1256: Alan Swinford
- 1257–1258: Anketil Mativaus
- 1259–1270: William Bagot
- 1271: William Bagot and William Morteyn
- 1272–1274: William Mortimer
- 1275–1277: William Hamelin
- 1278: Robert de Verdon and Thomas de Hasele
- 1279–1283: Robert de Verdon and Osbert Bereford
- 1284–1285: Robert de Verdon and Osbert Bereford and Thomas Farendon
- 1286: Thomas Farendon and Fulk de Lacy
- 1287: Fulk de Lucy
- 1288–1289: William Bonvill
- 1290–1291: Stephen Baber
- 1292: Stephen Baber and William de Castello
- 1293–1297: William de Castello
- 1298–1299: John Broughton

=== 14th century ===
- 1300–1301: Philip de Gayton
- 1302–1304: John le Dene and Richard Herehus
- 1305–1306: Richard Whitnere
- 1307: John le Dene and Geoffrey Segrave
- 1308–1309: Richard Herthull
- 1310–1311: John le Dene
- 1312–1313: John Olney
- 1314–1315: William Trussell
- 1316: Walter de Beauchamp
- 1317: Walter de Beauchamp and William Newill
- 1318: Ralph Beler of Kettleby
- 1319: William Nevill
- 1320–1321: Thomas le Rous
- 1322:
- 1323–1325: Henry Nottingham, Robert Morin and Oliver Waleys
- 1327: Roger Aylesbury
- 1328: Thomas Blancfront
- 1329: Robert Burdet
- 1330: Robert Burdet and Roger la Zouch
- 1331–1332: Roger Aylesbury
- 1333: Henry Hockley and Roger la Zouch
- 1334–1340: Roger la Zouch
- 1341: William Pieto
- 1342: Robert Bereford
- 1343–1344: John Waleys (son of Oliver, HS 1323)
- 1345–1369: Thomas de Beauchamp, 11th Earl of Warwick
- 1370: John Peach
- 1371: William Catesby
- 1372: Robert Harthull
- 1373: Roger Hillary
- 1374: John Boyvill
- 1375: John Burdet of Huncote, Leics
- 1376: William Breton
- 1377: Richard Harthull
- 1377: Roger Perewych
- 1378: John de Bermingham
- 1379: Sir William Flamville of Aston Flamville, Leics
- 1380: Thomas Ralegh
- 1381: Thomas de Bermingham
- 1382–1383: William Bagot of Bagington, Warks
- 1384: John de Bermingham
- 1385: Sir John Calveleigh of Stapleford, Leics. and Teigh
- 1386: John Parker
- 1387: Richard Ashby
- 1388: Sir William Flamville of Aston Flamville, Leics
- 1389: Adomar de Lichfield
- 1390: Sir Robert de Harington of Glooston, Leics
- 1391: John Malloery of Swinford
- 1392: Thomas de Woodford of Sproxton
- 1393: Thomas Oudeby of Stoke Dry, Rutland and Hathern, Leics
- 1394: Robert Veer of Thrapston, Leics
- 1395: Sir Henry Neville of Prestwold, Leics
- 1396: Robert Goushul
- 1397: John Eynesford
- 1398: Adomar de Lichfield
- 1399: Sir John Berkeley, Kt of Coston and Wymondham, Leics
- 1400: Sir Henry Neville, Kt of Prestwold, leics

=== 15th century ===
- 1400: Sir Henry Neville, Kt of Prestwold, Leics
- 1402: Sir Alfred Trussell, Kt of Nuthurst, Warks
- 1403: John Blaket
- 1404: Sir William Brokesby
- 1405: Sir John Berkeley, Kt
- 1406: Sir Thomas Lucy, Kt of Charlecote Park, Warks.
- 1407: John Parr
- 1408: Sir Henry Neville, Kt of Prestwold, Leics
- 1409: Sir William Brokesby of Shoby, Leics.
- 1410: Robert Castell of Withinbroke, Warks.
- 1411: Bartholemew Brokesby
- 1413: Thomas Crewe of Moor Hall in Wixford, Warws.
- 1414: Sir Richard Hastings, Kt
- 1415: Sir Thomas Burdet, Kt of Arrow
- 1416: John Mallory of Newbold Revel, Warks.
- 1417: William Bishopton
- 1418: John Salveyn
- 1419: Bartholemew Brokesby
- 1420–1421: Thomas Erdington of Erdington, Warks. and Thomas Maureward
- 1422: Sir Richard Hastings, Kt
- 1423: Humphrey Stafford
- 1424: John Mallory of Newbold Revel, Warks.
- 1425: Richard Cloddale
- 1426: Sir Richard Hastings, Kt
- 1427: Thomas Stanley
- 1428: William Peyto of Chesterton, Warks.
- 1429: Nicholas Rugeley of Dunton, Warwickshire
- 1430: Humphrey Stafford
- 1431: Sir William Mountfort, Kt of Coleshill-in-Arden, Warks
- 1432: Sir Richard Hastings, Kt
- 1433: Thomas Foulshurst
- 1434: Thomas Ardington
- 1435: William Lucy
- 1436: Sir William Peyto, Kt of Chesterton, Warks.
- 1437: Robert Ardern
- 1438: Sir Humphrey Stafford, Kt
- 1439: Sir Laurence Berkeley of Wymondham, Leics.
- 1440: Thomas Ashby of Lowesford
- 1441: Sir William Mountfort, Kt of Coleshill-in-Arden
- 1442: William Bermingham and Lawrence Sherrard of Stapleford, Leics.
- 1443: Lawrence Sherrard
- 1444: Robert Harcourt of Bosworth, Leics.
- 1445: Sir Thomas Erdington, Kt of Barrow, Leics
- 1446: Thomas Everingham
- 1447: Thomas Porter and William Purefoy
- 1448: William Purefoy
- 1449: William Lucy
- 1450: Sir William Mountfort, Kt of Coleshill-in-Arden
- 1451: Sir Robert Motun, Kt
- 1452: Sir William Bermingham, Kt
- 1453: Sir Edward or Leonard Hastings
- 1454: Thomas Berkeley of Wymondham
- 1455: William Hastings
- 1456: Thomas Walsh of Wanlip, Leics
- 1457: Thomas Maston
- 1458: Henry Filongley of Fillongley, Warks
- 1459: Sir Edmund Mountford, Kt
- 1460:
- 1461: Thomas Ferrers
- 1462–1463: John Grevill
- 1464: Sir William Harcourt, Kt
- 1465: John Huggford
- 1466: Thomas Thockmorton of Coughton Court, Warks.
- 1467: Ralph Woodford of Knipton, Leics.
- 1468: Sir Edward Raleigh, Kt
- 1469: Sir Thomas Ferrers, Kt
- 1470: Sir John Grevill, Kt
- 1471: Sir Simon Mountford, Kt
- 1472: William Motun
- 1473: John Huggford
- 1474: Sir John Grevill, Kt
- 1475: William Lucy
- 1476: Sir William Trussell, Kt
- 1477: John Branfitz
- 1478: Sir John Grevill, Kt
- 1479: Sir Thomas Pulteney of Misterton Hall, Leics
- 1480: Richard Boughton of Lauford, Warks.
- 1481: Thomas Colesey or Cocksey
- 1482: Sir Everard (or Edward) Fielding
- 1483: Thomas Entwysel
- 1483: Humphrey Beaufort of Guys Cliff, Warks.
- 1484: Richard Broughton and Robert Throgmorton
- 1485: John Digby
- 1486: Henry Lisle
- 1487: Robert Throgmorton
- 1488: Sir William Lucy, Kt
- 1489: Thomas Brereton
- 1490: Sir John Villiers Kt of Brokesby, Leics
- 1491: Robert Throgmorton
- 1492: Sir Thomas Pulteney, Kt of Misterton Hall, Leics
- 1493: Sir Ralph Shirley
- 1494: Sir John Villiers, Kt of Brooksby, Leics
- 1496: Sir Edward Raleigh, Kt
- 1496: William Brookesby
- 1497: Thomas Neville
- 1498: Sir Richard Pudsey, Kt
- 1499: Sir John Villiers, Kt of Brooksby, Leics
- 1500: Thomas Hasilrigg

=== 16th century ===
- 1501: Edward Belknap
- 1502: Nicholas Mallory
- 1503: Henry Lisle
- 1504: Nicholas Brome
- 1505: Sir Henry Willoughby
- 1506: Sir Edward Raleigh
- 1507: Thomas Trussel
- 1508: William Skeffington of Skeffington, Leics.
- 1509: Simon Digby
- 1510: Sir John Aston, Kt
- 1511: Sir Maurice Berkeley
- 1512: William Turpin
- 1513: Sir Edward Ferrers, Kt
- 1514: Sir John Digby, Kt
- 1515: Sir William Skeffington of Skeffington, Leics.
- 1516: Sir Maurice Berkeley
- 1517: Simon Digby
- 1518: Sir Edward Digby, Kt
- 1518: Sir Edward Ferrers, Kt
- 1519: Sir Henry Willoughby, Kt
- 1520: Everard Digby of Tilton, Leics. and Stoke Dry, Rutland
- 1521: Sir William Skeffington of Skeffington, Leics.
- 1522: William Browne
- 1523: Edward Conway
- 1524: Sir Thomas Lucy, Kt
- 1525: Sir Henry Willoughby, Kt
- 1526: Sir George Throckmorton, Kt
- 1527: Sir Thomas Poulteney, Kt
- 1528: Roger Ratcliffe
- 1529: Richard Verney
- 1530: Christopher Villiers of Burstal
- 1531: Sir John Villers of Brooksby Hall
- 1532: Sir John Harington of Exton, Rutland
- 1533: John Audley
- 1534: Reginald Digby
- 1535: William Broughton
- 1536: Walter Smith
- 1537: Sir John Villers of Brooksby Hall
- 1538: Thomas Nevill
- 1539: John Digby of Ab Kettleby, Leics.
- 1540: Richard Catesby of Lapworth, Warks
- 1541: Roger Wigston of Wolston, Warks
- 1542: Sir Fulke Greville
- 1543: Sir George Throgmorton, Kt
- 1544: Reginald Digby
- 1545: Sir Richard Catesby, Kt of Lapworth, Warks
- 1546: Francis Poulteney and William Leigh
- 1547: Sir Fulke Greville
- 1548: Sir Ambrose Cave of Kingsbury Hall, Kingsbury, Warwickshire
- 1549: Sir Richard Manners of Garendon Park, Leics.
- 1550: Sir Edward Hastings of Loughborough of Loughborough, Leics.
- 1550: Sir Edward Greville
- 1551: William Wigston of Wolston, Warks.
- 1552: Sir Thomas Neville
- 1553: Sir Robert Throckmorton of Coughton Court, Warwickshire
- 1554: Sir Thomas Hastings
- 1555: Sir Edward Greville
- 1556: Francis Shirley of Staunton Harold Hall and Ettington, Leics
- 1557: Sir William Wigston of Wolston, Warks.
- 1558: Henry Poole of Withcote, died and replaced by Brian Cave of Ingarsby, Leics.
- 1559: Thomas Lucy
- 1560: William Skeffington of Skeffington, Leics.
- 1561: Sir Thomas Neville, Kt
- 1562: Sir Richard Verney, Kt
- 1563: John Fisher
- 1564: Sir William Devereux of Merevale, Warks.
- 1565: Sir George Turpin, Kt of Knaptoft, Leics.
- 1566: Francis Smith of Ashby Folville, Leics.
- From 1567 the High Sheriff was High Sheriff of Warwickshire only
- 1567: Robert Middlemore of Edgbaston
- 1568: Basil Feilding of Newnham Paddox
- 1569: Simon Ardern
- 1570: Henry Goodere of Polesworth Hall
- 1571: Henry Compton of Compton Wynyates
- 1572: Sir Fulke Greville of Beauchamp Court.
- 1573: Samuel Marow of Berkswell
- 1574: Edward Arden
- 1575: William Boughton of Newbold
- 1576: Humphrey Ferrers
- 1577: William Catesby
- 1578: Thomas Lucy of Charlcote
- 1578: William Feilding of Newnham Paddox
- 1579: Edward Boughton of Cawston
- 1580: George Digby of Coleshill
- 1581: Thomas Leigh of Stoneleigh
- 1582: John Harington, 1st Baron Harington of Exton
- 1583: Edward Holte of Aston
- 1584: Sir Fulke Greville of Beauchamp Court
- 1585: Anthony Shuckburgh of Shuckburgh Hall
- 1586: Thomas Daubrigcourt of Solihull
- 1587: Humphrey Ferrers
- 1588: William Fielding
- 1589: William Boughton of Newbold
- 1590: Richard Verney of Compton Verney House
- 1591: William Leigh
- 1592: Ralph Hubaud of Ipsley Court, Warks
- 1593; Sir Edward Devereux of Castle Bromwich Hall
- 1594: Edward Greville of Milcote
- 1595: Thomas Leigh
- 1596: Robert Burgoyne of Wroxall Priory
- 1597: Clement Fisher of Great Packington
- 1598: Samuel Marowe
- 1599: Sir Thomas Holte of Aston
- 1600: Thomas Lucy

=== 17th century ===
- 1601: Robert Burdett of Bramcote
- 1602: William Peyto
- 1603: Bartholemew Hales
- 1604: Sir Richard Verney of Compton Verney House
- 1605: Thomas Beaufo
- 1606: Edward Boughton
- 1607: William Combe
- 1608: Andrew Archer of Umberslade Hall
- 1609: William Somervile
- 1610: Basil Feilding of Newnham Paddox
- 1611: Thomas Lucy of Charlecote Park
- 1612: Clement Throgmorton of Hasley
- 1613: John Reppington
- 1614: Sir John Ferrers of Tamworth
- 1615: William Combe
- 1616: Sir Walter Devereux, 5th Viscount Hereford of Castle Bromwich Hall
- 1617: John Shuckburgh of Shuckburgh Hall
- 1618: Sir Francis Leigh of Newnham Regis
- 1619: Robert Lee
- 1620: Sir Thomas Temple, 1st Baronet, of Stowe, Buckinghamshire
- 1621: William Noell
- 1622: John Hubaud
- 1623: Sir Thomas Puckering, 1st Baronet of Priory House, Warwick
- 1624: Sir Hercules Underhill of Idlicote
- 1625: John Newdigate of Arbury Hall
- 1626: Sir Simon Archer of Umberslade Hall
- 1627: Robert Fisher
- 1628: George Devereux
- 1629: Roger Burgoyne of Wroxall Priory
- 1630: William Purefoy of Caldecote
- 1631: William Boughton of Lawford Hall (later Sir William Boughton, 1st Bt)
- 1632: Thomas Lucy of Charlecote Park
- 1633: Simon Clerke
- 1634: Richard Murden
- 1635: Sir Greville Verney of Compton Verney House
- 1636: Sir Thomas Leigh, 1st Baronet of Stoneleigh
- 1637: John Lisle
- 1638: Sir Edward Underhill of Idlicote
- 1639: George Warner of Wolston
- 1640: Edward Ferrers of Baddesley Clinton
- 1641: Sir Isaac Astley of Hill Morton.
- Civil War and Interregnum
- 1646: Richard Lucy of Charlecote Park
- 1647: Sir Greville Verney
- 1648: George Browne
- 1649: Thomas Combe
- 1650: Sir Henry Gibbes
- 1651: Richard Somervile of Edson
- 1652: Ralph Bovey, later Sir Ralph Bovey, 1st Baronet of Hillfields.
- 1653: John Danvers
- 1654: Edward Peytoe
- 1655: Thomas Willughby
- 1656: Stephen Bolton
- 1657: George Pudsey
- 1658–59: Sir Robert Holte, 2nd Baronet of Aston Hall
- 1660: Sir Edward Boughton, 2nd Baronet of Lawford Hall
- 1661: Thomas Boughton
- 1662: William Chetwin
- 1663 Henry Ferrers
- 1664 Sir John Knightley, 1st Baronet of Offchurch
- 12 November 1665: Charles Bentley
- 7 November 1666: John Stratford, of Nuneaton
- 6 November 1667: Fulwar Skipwith
- 15 November 1667: Sir Thomas Rous, 1st Baronet
- 6 November 1668: Humphrey Jennings
- 11 November 1669: Francis Willoughby
- 24 November 1669: Sir Robert Dryden, 3rd Baronet
- 4 November 1670: Francis Willoughby
- 9 November 1671: George Devereux
- 11 November 1672: Richard Taylor
- 12 November 1673: Robert Andrews
- 28 February 1673/4: Nicholas Overbury
- 5 November 1674: Edward Hinton
- 12 November 1674: Anthony Stanton
- 15 November 1675: John Rous, of Tachbrooke Mallory
- 1676: ?Henry Ferrers of Baddesley Clinton
- 10 November 1676: Henry Pudsey
- 23 November Thomas Coton, of Coton
- 15 November 1677: Thomas Marriott, of Whitchurch
- 14 November 1678: Sir William Jesson
- 13 November 1679: Robert Philips
- 4 November 1680: John Chamberlain
- 1682: Edward Hinton
- 1683: Sir Andrew Hacket replaced by Thomas Lucy of Charlecote Park
- 1684: Richard Verney, Baron Verney of Allexton, Leics. and Compton Verney
- 1685: Sir Andrew Hacket of Moxhull, Wishaw
- 1686: Sir Charles Shuckburgh, 2nd Baronet of Shuckburgh Hall
- 1687: Thomas Clarke
- 1688: Sir William Boughton, 4th Bt of Lawford Hall.
- 1689: Sir Reginald Forster of Loxley Hall near Stratford upon Avon
- 1690: Sir Thomas Wagstaffe of Harbury and Tachbook Mallory
- 1691: Sir William Bishop
- 1692: Thomas Fetherston of Packwood House
- 1693: Richard Booth
- 1694: Thomas Man replaced by Abraham Bracebridge
- 1695: Edward Bentley
- 1696: William Peyto of Chesterton replaced by Edward Raney of Watergate
- 1697: Samuel Stevenson of Sutton Coldfield
- 1698: Thomas Bayly
- 1699: William Colmore of Old Deanery, Warwick

=== 18th century ===
- 1700: John Shugbrough
- 1701: Thomas Man
- 1702: John Addis
- 1703: Edward Broughton
- 1704: John Chetwin
- 1705: Humphrey Creswold
- 1706: John Newesham
- 1707: John Knightley alias Witwick
- 1708: Theodore Stratford
- 1709: Ward Dilke of Maxstoke Castle
- 1710: John Sneyd
- 1711: William Stoughton
- 1712: Edward Boughton
- 1713: Thomas Chambers
- 1714: William Bolton replaced by Court D'Ewes of Maplebury
- 1715: Hercules Underhill
- 1716: George Lucy replaced by Sir William Dixwell Bt. of Coton House, Churchover.
- 1717: John Mead of Watergall
- 1718: Edward Lewis of Ratley
- 1719: John Radborne
- 1720: Sir Edward Boughton, 5th Bt of Lawford Hall.
- 1721: Thomas Bailey
- 1721: John Mead
- 1722: Randall Croxhall
- 1723: Thomas Webb of Sherborn
- 1724: John Marriott
- 1725: John Newsham
- 1726: Waldive Willington
- 1727: William Fielding
- 1728: Samuel Mead of Watergall
- 1728: ?Sanderson Miller
- 1729: Sir Clobery Holte, Bt
- 1729: ?John Ward
- 1730: Samuel Stevenson Alleyn
- 1731: Richard Symonds of Woolbey
- 1732: Thomas Price
- 1733: Egidius Palmer
- 1734: William Bumpstead
- 1735: Robert Parker
- 1736: John Matthews of Murcott
- 1737: Charles Palmer of Ladbrooke
- 1738: Pudsey Jesson
- 1739: Edward Bowater
- 1740: William Dilk 9
- 1741: William Wright
- 1742: Edward Reppington
- 1743: Bourne Eabourne
- 1744: Sir Theophilus Biddulph, Bt
- 1745: Thomas Adderley
- 1746: John Hunt of Windson Green
- 1747: John Addis of Moor Hall
- 1748: Sir Edward Boughton, 6th Baronet of Lawford Hall
- 1749: Wilson Aylesbury
- 1750: Paul Bane
- 1751: Edmund Chambers
- 1752: Phillips Littleton of Studley
- 1753: Benjamin Palmer of Oulton End
- 1754: Thomas Webster of Canley
- 1755: William Willington of Hurley
- 1756: John Taylor of Sheldon Hall
- 1757: Edward Jordan of Birmingham
- 1758: William Dilk, of Maxtock Castle
- 1759: David Lewis of Malvern Hall
- 1760: Miller Sadler of Upper Whitaker
- 1761: Andrew Hackett the Younger of Moxhull
- 1762: Thomas Fisher of Springfield
- 1763: Isaac Spooner of Birmingham
- 1764: John Knightley of Offchurch
- 1765: Robert Child of Upton
- 1766: John Bree of Bewshall
- 1767: Egerton Bagot, of Pype Hayes Hall
- 1768: John Partheriche of Clopton House, Stratford on Avon
- 1769: George Lucy of Charlecote.
- 1770: Sir Charles Shuckburgh, 5th Baronet of Shuckburgh Hall
- 1771: Sir William Wheler, Bt. of Leamington Hastings
- 1772 John Venour of Wellsbourn
- 1773: Willam Grove of Honiley
- 1774: William Holbech of Farnborough Hall
- 1775: Seth Nelson of Hatton
- 1776: Sir Thomas Gooch, Bt of Birmingham
- 1777: Gore Townsend of Honiton
- 1778: Charles Bowyer Adderley of Hams Hall
- 1779: Samuel Aylworth of Halford
- 1780: Henry Christopher Wise of the Priory, Warwick
- 1781: John Webb
- 1782: Rowland Farmer Okeover
- 1783: John Neale
- 1784: Joseph Boultbee of Baxterley replaced by Francis Burdett of Bramcote
- 1785: Joseph Boultbee, of Baxterley
- 1786: John Taylor of Bordesley Hall, Birmingham
- 1787: Thomas Mason of Stratford-on-Avon
- 1788: William Elliot of Counden
- 1789: Thomas Ward, of Moreton Morrell
- 1790: Henry Clay
- 1791: Charles Palmer of Ladbrooke
- 1792: Joseph Oughton of Sutton Coldfield
- 1793: Evelyn Shirley of Eatington
- 1794: Richard Hill of Kineton
- 1795: Francis Holyoake of Alne
- 1796: Edward Croxall
- 1797: Robert Knight of Barrells Hall, Henley-in-Arden
- 1798: Robert Harvey Mallery of Woodcot
- 1799: Francis Fauquier of Stoney Thorpe

=== 19th century ===
- 21 February 1800: Sir Theophilus Biddulph, 5th Baronet, of Birdingbury
- 17 March 1801: John Stanton, of Kenilworth
- 3 February 1802: Heneage Legge, of Aston Hall
- 3 February 1803: Henry Greswold Lewis, of Malvern Hall
- 1 February 1804: Roger Vaughton, of Sutton Coldfield
- 6 February 1805: Francis Parrott, of Bedworth
- 1 February 1806: George Lloyd, of Welcombe House
- 4 February 1807: Matthew Blackett Wise, of the Priory, Warwick
- 24 February 1808: John Fullarton, of Barton-on-the-Heath
- 6 February 1809: Abraham Bracebridge, of Atherstone
- 31 January 1810: James West, of Arlescote
- 8 February 1811: Francis Newdigate, of Arbury Hall
- 24 January 1812: Samuel Peach, of Idlicote
- 10 February 1813: Evelyn Shirley, of Ettington
- 4 February 1814: Andrew Hackett, of Moxhull Hall
- 13 February 1815: James Woolley, of Icknield House
- 1816: William Holbech of Farnborough
- 1817: Henry Verney of Compton Verney
- 1818: Robert Vyner of Eathorpe
- 1819: John Eardley Eardley-Wilmot of Berkswell Hall
- 1820: Christopher Roberts Wren of Wroxall Abbey
- 1821: William Withering of the Larches replaced by Abraham Caldecote of the Lodge, Rugby
- 1822: Matthew Wise of Leamington Priors
- 1823: Edward Willes of Newbold Comyn
- 1824: Robert Middleton Atty of Snitterfield
- 1825: Chandos Leigh, of Stoneleigh Abbey
- 1826: Lionel Place of Weddington Hall
- 1827: William Dilke of Maxtock Castle
- 1828: Sir George Chetwynd, 2nd Baronet of Brocton Hall.
- 1829: James Watt of Aston Hall
- 1830: Edward Bolton King, of Umberslade
- 1831: George Hammond Lucy of Charlecote
- 1832: Edmund Meysey Wigley Greswolde, of Malvern Hall was initially appointed but was replaced by John Gamaliel Lloyd, of Welcombe House
- 1833: Sir John Mordaunt, 9th Baronet, of Walton
- 1834: Francis Lyttleton Holyoake-Goodricke, of Studley Castle
- 1835: Charles Bertie Percy, of Guy's Cliff
- 1836: Henry Cadwallader Adams, of Ansty was initially appointed, but was replaced by Henry Thomas Chamberlayne, of Stoney Thorpe
- 1837: Henry Cadwallader Adams, of Ansty
- 1838: Samuel Jones-Loyd, of Wolvey
- 1839: Sir Francis Lawley, 7th Baronet, of Middleton Hall
- 1840: Dempster Heming, of Caldecote Hall
- 1841: Kelynge Greenway, of Warwick
- 1842: John Little, of Newbold Pacey Hall
- 1843: Arthur Francis Gregory, of Stivichall Hall
- 1844: Sir Francis Shuckburgh, 8th Baronet, of Shuckburgh
- 1845: James Roberts West of Alscot Park
- 1846: Charles Thomas Warde, of Clopton House
- 1847: George Whieldon, of Springfield House
- 1848: Thomas Dilke, of Maxstoke Castle
- 1849: Sir Theophilus Biddulph, 6th Baronet, of Birdingbury Hall, Rugby
- 1850: Darwin Galton, of Edstone Hall, Wootton Wawen
- 1851: Mark Philips of Welcombe House, Stratford upon Avon
- 1852: Sir John Newdigate Ludford Chetwode of Ansley Hall
- 1853: Sir William Edmund Cradock-Hartopp, Bt of Four Oaks Hall, Sutton Coldfield
- 1854: William Charles Alston of Elmdon
- 1855: Chandos Wren-Hoskyns of Wroxall Abbey
- 1856: Sir Peter Van Notten Pole, Bt of Todenham House, Gloucestershire
- 1857: Henry Spencer Lucy of Charlecote House
- 1858: Owen Pell of Radford Semele, near Leamington Spa
- 1859: Sir George Richard Philips, Bt, of Weston House, Shipston-on-Stour
- 1860: Henry James Sheldon of Brailes House
- 1861: Richard Greaves of The Cliff, Warwick
- 1862: Charles Lennox Butler of Coton House, Churchover, Rugby
- 1863: Charles Marriott Caldecott of Holbrook Grange, Rugby
- 1864: James Beech of Brandon
- 1865: Henry Townshend Boultbee of Springfield
- 1866: Sir Robert Hamilton, 6th Baronet, of Avon Cliffe, Stratford-upon-Avon
- 1867: Evelyn Philip Shirley of Ettington Park
- 1868: James Dugdale of Wroxall Abbey
- 1869: Edward Wood of Newbold Revel
- 1870: Charles Fetherston Dilke of Maxstoke Castle
- 1871: John Thomas Arkwright of Hatton House
- 1872: Thomas Lloyd of The Priory, Warwick
- 1873: Sir Frederick Pell of Hampton in Arden
- 1874: Edward Allesley Boughton Ward Boughton Leigh of Brownsover Hall
- 1875: Sir George Chetwynd, 4th Baronet, of Grendon Hall, Atherstone
- 1876: William Stratford Dugdale of Merevale Hall
- 1877: Edward Petre of Whitley Abbey
- 1878: James Cove Jones of Loxley
- 1879: Sir Charles Mordaunt Bt of Walton Hall, near Wellesbourne
- 1880: Charles Rowland Palmer-Morewood of Ladbroke Hall
- 1881: Sir Arthur Hodgson of Clopton House near Stratford upon Avon
- 1882: Charles William Paulet of Wellesbourne House
- 1883: Thomas Aloysius Perry of Bitham House, Avon Dassett
- 1884: William Charles Alston of Elmdon Hall
- 1885: Henry Chance, of Sherborne House, Warwick
- 1886: James Darlington of Bourton Hall, Rugby
- 1887: Thomas Henry Goodwin Newton of Barrells Park, Henley in Arden
- 1888: John Jaffray of Park Grove House, Bristol Road, Edgbaston, Birmingham
- 1889: Josiah Yeomans Robins of West Hill, Leamington
- 1890: Rowland John Beech of Brandon Lodge, Coventry
- 1891: George Beard of Thickthorn, Kenilworth
- 1892: George Allen Everitt of Knowle Hall, near Birmingham
- 1893: Henry Fisher of Moxhull Hall, near Erdington
- 1894: Charles Alston Smith-Ryland of Barford Hall, Warwick
- 1895: Henry Cunliffe Shawe of Weddington Hall, Nuneaton
- 1896: Joshua Hirst Wheatley of Berkswell Hall, Berkswell
- 1897: Howard Proctor Ryland of Moxhull Hall, Erdington
- 1898: Francis Seddon Bolton of Ashfield, Edgbaston, Birmingham
- 1899: Michael Henry Lakin of Warwick
- 1900: Morton Peto Lucas of Leamington

=== 20th century ===
- 1901: Henry Leigh Townshend, of Caldecote Hall, Nuneaton
- 1902: Frederick Ernest Muntz, of Umberslade Hall, Birmingham
- 1903: Arthur Lucas Chance, of Great Alne House, Alcester
- 1904: Thomas Arthur Motion of Chadshunt, near Kineton
- 1905: Henry Herbert Coldwell Horsfall, of Penns Hall, Sutton Coldfield
- 1906: Sir William Jaffray of Skilts, near Studley
- 1907: James B. Dugdale, of Wroxall Abbey, Warwick
- 1908: Albert Cay of Woodside, Kenilworth
- 1909: Frederick James Shaw of Bourton Hall, near Rugby
- 1910: Lord Algernon Malcolm Arthur Percy, of Guys Cliffe, Warwick
- 1911: William Francis Stratford Dugdale, FSA, of Merevale Hall, Atherstone
- 1912: Sir Walter Newton Fisher, of Lawnfield, Edgbaston, Birmingham
- 1913: Captain Sir Francis Ernest Waller, 4th Baronet
- 1914: Colonel William FitzThomas Wyley
- 1915: Thomas Owen Lloyd of The Priory, Warwick and of Dolobran, Montgomeryshire.
- 1916: John Arthur James of Coton House, Churchover
- 1917: Andrew Richard Motion of Upton House, Banbury
- 1918: George Frederick Jackson of Springfield House, Knowle
- 1919: Edmund William Parker of Westfield House, near Rugby
- 1920: James Rollason of Hampton Manor, Hampton in Arden
- 1921: Sir Gerald Francis Stewkley Shuckburgh of Shuckburgh Hall
- 1922: Colonel Herbert Hall Mullinger of Clifton Court, Rugby
- 1923: Ludford Charles Docker of Alveston Leys, near Stratford on Avon
- 1924: Robert Darley Guinness of Wootton Hall, Warwickshire, Wootton Wawen
- 1925: Lt Col. James Henry Coldwell-Horsfall of Northumberland House, Leamington Spa
- 1926: Charles Ivor Phipson Smith-Ryland of Barford Hill.
- 1927: John Alfred Watson of Chadwick Manor, Knowle.
- 1928: Capt. Gerald Douglas E. Muntz, of Umberslade Hall
- 1929: Major A. W. Huntington of Wellesbourne House.
- 1930: Brig. Gen. E. A. Wiggin, of Greys Mallory, near Warwick.
- 1931: Geoffrey Bird of Blythe Hall, Widney Manor.
- 1932: John Davenport Siddeley, of Crackley Hall, Kenilworth
- 1933: Sir Charles Hyde, Baronet, of The Moat, Berkswell
- 1934: Lt. Colonel Charles Joshua Hirst Wheatley of Berkswell Hall
- 1935: Captn. Harold Stanley Cayzer of Dunchurch Lodge
- 1936: Frank Noel Horton of Idlicote, Shipston on Stour
- 1937: Sir Samuel Hanson Rowbotham of Brooke Hill, Isle of Wight
- 1938: Graham Baron Ash of Packwood House, Hockley Heath
- 1939: Sir Frederick Charles Maitland Freake of the Old Manor House, Halford
- 1940: Sir John Bedford Burman of Tibbington House, Edgbaston
- 1941: Lt.-Col. Graham Beauchamp Coxeter Rees Mogg of Clifford Manor
- 1942: Colonel Sir Charles Richard Henry Wiggin, 3rd Baronet, of Honington Hall, Shipston-on-Stour
- 1943: Captain Oliver Bird, of The Chase, Bentley Heath, Knowle
- 1944: Lt Col Cyril Davenport Siddeley of Crackley Hall, Kenilworth
- 1945: Sir Harry Vincent of Priory Dene, Edgbaston.
- 1946: Sir Ernest Robert Canning, of The Grey House, Handsworth
- 1947: Robert Grosvenor Perry of Barton House, Moreton in Marsh.
- 1948: Kenneth Macomb Chance of Radford Manor, near Leamington Spa.
- 1949: Philip Stanley Rendall of Bridge House, Hunningham
- 1950: Colonel Reginald John Cash, of Walcote, Blackdown, Leamington Spa
- 1951: Walford Hollier Turner, of Holmwood, Somerset Road, Edgbaston
- 1952: Sir Edward William Salt, of Avon Hurst, Tiddington, Stratford-upon-Avon
- 1953: Lt.-Col. Gerard Thomas S. Horton
- 1954: Brigadier Ralph Charles Matthews of Toft House, Dunchurch, near Rugby
- 1955: George Tom Mills of Park House, Park Hill, Kenilworth
- 1956: Major George Frederick D. Wade,
- 1957: Lt.-Col. George John Walford Turner, of Westfield Road, Edgbaston
- 1958: John Charles Burman, of Packwood Hall, Hockley Heath, Solihull
- 1959: Major John Walter Mills of Kenilworth Road, Coventry
- 1960: Edward George Walpole-Brown of Halford Manor, Shipston-on-Stour
- 1961: John Ludford Docker of Alveston Hill Farm near Stratford upon Avon
- 1962: Lieut.-Colonel John Bernard Challen of Kington Grange, Claverdon, Warwick
- 1963: Arthur Chamberlain, of Wellington Road, Edgbaston
- 1964: William Michael Maddocks of Kenilworth Road, Coventry
- 1965: Sir Charles Gerald Stewkley Shuckburgh, 12th Baronet, of Shuckburgh Hall, Daventry
- 1966: Victor William Oubridge, of Wasperton House, Warwick
- 1967: Charles Mortimer Tollemache Smith-Ryland, of Sherbourne Park, Warwick
- 1968: Frederick Devereux Muntz, of The Leasowes, Tanworth-in-Arden
- 1969: Hugh Kenrick, of Farquhar Road, Edgbaston, Birmingham
- 1970: Captain Francis Humphrey Maurice FitzRoy Newdegate, of Arbury Hall, Nuneaton
- 1971: Captain Sir William Stratford Dugdale, 2nd Baronet, of Blyth Hall, Coleshill
- 1972: Eric Lionel Claridge, of Valleyfields, Offchurch, near Leamington Spa.
- 1973: Captain J. W. Alston-Roberts-West, of Alscot Park, Stratford-upon-Avon

== High Sheriffs ==
=== 20th century ===
- 1974: Captain Charles B. Fetherston-Dilke of Maxstoke Castle.
- 1975: Barry Gillitt
- 1976: Major Sir John H. Wiggin, Baronet of Honington Hall, Shipston on Stour.
- 1977: Major Rupert B. Kettle
- 1978: Henry Anthony Feilding of The Manor House, Pailton, Rugby
- 1979: George Ludford Docker of Alveston Hill, near Stratford upon Avon
- 1980: Joseph Fitzwilliam Carvell, of Oak Grange, Leamington Spa.
- 1981: Dennis Lowndes Flower, of Ilmington Manor, Shipston-on-Stour
- 1982: Martin Dunne, of Chadshunt, Kineton
- 1983: Robert Peter Richard Iliffe
- 1984: Hamish L. Gray-Cheape
- 1985: James Lionel Malin Graham of Gable House, Offchurch, Leamington Spa
- 1986: Christopher B. Holman
- 1987: Patrick Robert Doyne, of Woodlands, Idlicote, Shipston-on-Stour.
- 1988: Elizabeth Creak
- 1989: David Colin Rutherford, of the Old Rectory, Ladbroke, Leamington Spa
- 1990: John Davenport Siddeley Ainscow
- 1991: Major Richard Patrick Gordon Dill
- 1992: Major Bristow Charles Bovill
- 1993: Donald Charles Wasdell
- 1994: Henry David Warriner
- 1995: Stephen Geoffrey Evans
- 1996: Major John Waddington Oakes
- 1997: Lady Butler
- 1998: David John Barnes, Kington Grange, Claverdon
- 1999: Michael C. Fetherston-Dilke of Maxstoke Castle.

=== 21st century ===
- 2000–2001: John S. Hammon
- 2001–2002: Sarah Holman
- 2002–2003: William Matthew Stratford Dugdale
- 2003–2004: Roger V. Wiglesworth
- 2004–2005: Gwendoline M. Jefferson
- 2005–2006: Balraj Singh Dhesi (of Royal Leamington Spa)
- 2006–2007: Jeremy Martin Pragnell
- 2007–2008: Andrew John Arkwright
- 2008–2009: Anna March Trye
- 2009–2010: Linda, Lady Kilmaine of Shelfield, Alcaster
- 2010–2011: Richard Michael Hardy of Stratford-upon-Avon
- 2011–2012: Timothy Blakiston Cox of Snitterfield, Stratford-upon-Avon
- 2012–2013: Robert Bernard Waley-Cohen of Banbury
- 2013–2014: Keith Howard Sach of Meriden
- 2014–2015: Clare Hopkinson
- 2015–2016: Janet Bell Smith
- 2016–2017: Richard Markham D'Aguilar Samuda (of Slindon Common, Arundel)
- 2017–2018: Mark Edward Trehearne Davies (of Shipston-on-Stour)
- 2018–2019: Clare Anna Insull Sawdon of Hatton, Warwick
- 2019–2020: Simon James Victor Miesegaes (of Shipston-on-Stour)
- 2020–2021: Joseph Greenwell (of Harbury, Royal Leamington Spa)
- 2021–2022: Lady Willoughby de Broke of (of Moreton-in-Marsh)
- 2022–2023: David Randon Kelham (of Warwick)
- 2023–2024: Sophie Elizabeth Hilleary
- 2024-2025: Rajvinder Kaur Gill, of Kenilworth
- 2025-2026: Karen Jane Lynch, of Rugby
- 2026–2027: Susan Rasmussen, of Leamington Spa

== Sources ==
- Debrett's Illustrated Baronetage, with the Knightage, 1876, Dean and Son (London), 1876
- Debrett's Baronetage, Knightage and Companionage, 1954, C. F. J. Hankinson (ed.), 1954
- Birmingham Post Year Book and Who's Who, various editions, 1973–85
- Whitaker's Almanack, various editions
- History of the Commoners of Great Britain and Ireland. Volumes 1–4 (1835) John Burke (ISBN 978-0-8063-0742-8) A Genealogical and Heraldic History of the Commoners of Great Britain and Ireland, Volume 2 at Google Books
