= Brokesby =

Brokesby may refer to:

- Francis Brokesby
- Thomas Brokesby
- William Brokesby (d.1416), Marshal of the Kings Hall, MP & Sheriff of Leicestershire
- Brooksby, Leicestershire
