= Sir Thomas Hesilrige, 1st Baronet =

English politician

Portrait by Michiel Jansz. van Mierevelt.

Sir Thomas Hesilrige, 1st Baronet (1564 – 11 January 1629) was an English politician who sat in the House of Commons in 1614 and 1624.

Hesilrige was the son of Thomas Hesilrige of Noseley Hall, Noseley, Leicestershire and his wife Ursula Andrews daughter of Sir Thomas Andrews of Charwelton, Northamptonshire and his wife Catherine Cave.

He was High Sheriff of Leicestershire in 1613. In 1614, Hesilrige was elected Member of Parliament for Leicestershire in the Addled Parliament. He was created baronet on 21 July 1622. He was re-elected MP for Leicestershire in 1624.

Hesilrige married Frances Gorges, daughter of Sir William Gorges of Alderton, Northamptonshire and had eight sons and five daughters. He was succeeded in the baronetcy by his son Arthur who was one of the Five Members Charles I tried to arrest at the House of Commons in 1642.

Parliament of England
Preceded by Sir George Villiers; Basil Brooke	Member of Parliament for Leicestershire; 1614; With: Sir George Hastings	Succeeded by Sir George Hastings; Sir Henry Hastings
Preceded by Sir George Hastings; Sir Henry Hastings	Member of Parliament for Leicestershire; 1624; With: Sir Henry Hastings	Succeeded by Ferdinando Lord Hastings; Sir Wolstan Dixie
Baronetage of England
New creation	Baronet (of Noseley Hall); 1622–1629	Succeeded by Arthur Haselrig
