= John Biddulph (disambiguation) =

Colonel John Biddulph (1840–1921) was a British soldier, author and naturalist who served in the government of British India.

John Biddulph may also refer to:

- John Biddulph (MP), in 1419, MP for Newcastle-under-Lyme
- John Burnet Biddulph (1796–1837), South African explorer and trader
- John Biddulph, 2nd Baron Biddulph (1869–1949), see Baron Biddulph

== See also ==
- Biddulph (disambiguation)
