= Theophilus Biddulph (disambiguation) =

Theophilus Biddulph (1612–1683) was an English MP.

Theophilus Biddulph may also refer to:

- Sir Theophilus Biddulph, 3rd Baronet (1683–1743), of the Biddulph baronets
- Sir Theophilus Biddulph, 4th Baronet (1720–1798), of the Biddulph baronets
- Sir Theophilus Biddulph, 5th Baronet (1757–1841), of the Biddulph baronets
- Sir Theophilus Biddulph, 6th Baronet (1785–1854), of the Biddulph baronets
- Sir Theophilus Biddulph, 7th Baronet (1830–1883), of the Biddulph baronets
- Sir Theophilus Biddulph, 8th Baronet (1874–1948), of the Biddulph baronets

== See also ==
- Biddulph (disambiguation)
