= Francis Staresmore =

English politician

Francis Staresmore (1578 - 1626) was an English politician who sat in the House of Commons in 1626.

Staresmore was the son of Sabine Staresmore, of Frolesworth, Leicestershire. He matriculated at Queen's College, Oxford on 14 October 1596 aged 17. In 1626, he was elected Member of Parliament for Leicestershire and died later in the same year.

Parliament of England
Preceded by Ferdinando Lord Hastings; Sir Wolstan Dixie	Member of Parliament for Leicestershire; 1626; With: Sir Henry Hastings	Succeeded by Sir Edward Hartopp; Ferdinando Lord Hastings
