= Henry Hastings (MP) =

English politician

Sir Henry Hastings (died 1629) was an English politician who sat in the House of Commons at various times between 1601 and 1626.

There were two contemporaneous individuals called Henry Hastings in Leicestershire that could have been this MP. The more likely is considered to be the son of Sir Edward Hastings of Leicester Abbey. The alternative is the son of Walter Hastings of Braunston. One of these (probably the subject of the article) attended Emmanuel College, Cambridge and the other Lincoln College, Oxford. Both individuals were knighted in 1603 and lived near Leicester.

In 1601, Hastings was elected Member of Parliament for Leicestershire and was re-elected MP for Leicestershire in 1621, 1624 and 1626. He was a J.P. by 1606 and was appointed High Sheriff of Leicestershire for 1607–08.

Hastings married Mabel Faunt, daughter of Anthony Faunt of Foston, Leicestershire and had four sons and three daughters.

Parliament of England
Preceded by Sir Edward Hastings; Sir Francis Hastings	Member of Parliament for Leicestershire; 1601; With: William Skipwith	Succeeded by Sir George Villiers; Thomas Beaumont
Preceded by Sir George Hastings; Sir Thomas Hesilrige	Member of Parliament for Leicestershire; 1621–1624; With: Sir George Hastings; Sir Thomas Hesilrige	Succeeded by Ferdinando Lord Hastings; Sir Wolstan Dixie
Preceded by Ferdinando Lord Hastings; Sir Wolstan Dixie	Member of Parliament for Leicestershire; 1626; With: Francis Staresmore	Succeeded by Sir Edward Hartopp; Ferdinando, Lord Hastings
