= John Berkeley (died c. 1415) =

English politician (died c. 1415)

Sir John Berkeley (died c. 1415), of Coston and Wymondham in Leicestershire, was an English politician who represented Leicestershire in Parliament. He sat as MP for Leicestershire in 1402, October 1404, and 1411.

He was knighted before December 1392.

== Political career ==
He also served as lieutenant of Guernsey before April 1394; Sheriff of Warwickshire and Leicestershire from 22 August 1399 till 24 November 1400, and 22 November 1405 till 5 November 1406; justice of the peace of Leicestershire from 16 September 1404 till February 1413.

He also served as commissioner of array of Warwickshire, and Leicestershire in May 1405; commissioner of inquiry in Leicestershire in May 1408 concerning a claim of William Bispham to the manor of Dalby.

== Family ==
He was the son and heir of Sir John Berkeley (died c. 1377) of Wymondham possibly by his wife Elizabeth. He married Isabel and had one son Sir Laurence Berkeley.
