= William Combe (died 1667) =

William Combe (1586 – 30 January 1667) was an English landowner who briefly sat in the House of Commons for part of 1640.

Combe was the son of Thomas Combe of Warwickshire and his wife Maria Savage. He was baptised at Stratford on 8 December 1586. He matriculated at Christ Church, Oxford on 8 July 1603 aged 15. The Combe family had some connection with William Shakespeare. Combe's uncle another William Combe was High Sheriff and sold property to Shakespeare in 1602. Another uncle John Combe left Combe some land at Welcombe when he died in 1614. Combe immediately caused a local dispute when he tried to enclose some land at Welcombe. The council took action against Combe's enclosure, but Shakespeare gave some support to Combe. Combe was probably that one of this name who was High Sheriff of Warwickshire in 1616.

In April 1640, Combe was elected member of parliament for Warwickshire in the Short Parliament. He was elected again as a member for Warwickshire for the Long Parliament of November 1640, but his election was declared void in December 1640.

Combe died at Stratford in January 1667 aged 80.

Combe married Katharine Boughton, daughter of Edward Boughton. She died in 1662. They had one son and nine daughters.

Parliament of England
Parliament suspended since 1629	Member of Parliament for Warwickshire; 1640; With: Sir Thomas Lucy	Succeeded by Richard Shuckburgh; James Compton
