= Nicholas Beaumont =

16th-century English politician

Nicholas Beaumont (born before 1526 – 1585), of Coleorton, Leicestershire, was an English politician. He was the eldest son of Richard Beaumont of Coleorton.

He was a justice of the peace for Leicestershire from 1588 and was appointed High Sheriff of Leicestershire for 1577–78.

He was elected a member (MP) of the Parliament of England for Leicestershire in 1563 and 1572 and for Bramber in 1584.

He married Anne, the daughter of William Saunders of Welford, Northamptonshire and had 4 sons, three of whom were:

- his heir Henry Beaumont, MP for Leicester
- Thomas Beaumont who succeeded his brother as MP for Leicester.
- Huntingdon Beaumont, mining entrepreneur known for his use of the Wollaton Wagonway to transport coal, forerunner of modern railways
