= Aston Flamville Manor =

Coordinates: 52.53°N 1.32°W

- Interactive map of the Aston Flamville Manor area

General information
- Type: House
- Location: Aston Flamville, United Kingdom
- Renovated: 18th century

Aston Flamville Manor is a house in the village of Aston Flamville, Leicestershire. The front of the house was rebuilt in the 18th century, with five bays and two storeys.

== Notes and references ==
=== Sources ===
- Pevsner, Nikolaus (1960). The Buildings of England: Leicestershire and Rutland (Harmondsworth: Penguin Books)
