= John Bellers (MP) =

English politician

John Bellers (fl. 1381–1414) was an English politician. He sat as MP for Leicestershire in November 1414.

He was the younger son of Sir James Bellers by his second wife Margaret. He was the half-brother of James Bellers. Before 1404, he married Elizabeth (c. 1392 – 18 August 1427), the daughter and eventual heiress of Anthony Howeby alias Sutton (died 1422) and they had one son, John and three daughters.
