= George Hastings (died 1641) =

English politician

Sir George Hastings (died 4 June 1641) was an English politician who sat in the House of Commons at various times between 1614 and 1626.

== Biography ==
Hastings was the second son of Francis Hastings, Lord Hastings and his wife Sarah Harington, daughter of Sir James Harington and Lucy Sydney. He was admitted at Sidney Sussex College, Cambridge on 2 July 1605 and at Gray's Inn on 22 March 1611. He was of Ashby-de-la-Zouch, Leicestershire and was knighted on 3 November 1619.

In 1614 and 1621 he was elected MP for Leicestershire. He was elected MP for Leicester in a by-election in 1625 and was re-elected MP for Leicester in 1626.

Hastings died in 1641 and was buried at St Bartholomew the Great, Smithfield, London.

Parliament of England
Preceded by Sir George Villiers; Sir Basil Brooke	Member of Parliament for Leicestershire; 1614–1621; With: Sir Thomas Hesilrige 1614; Sir Henry Hastings 1621–1622	Succeeded by Sir Thomas Hesilrige; Sir Henry Hastings
Preceded by Thomas Jermyn; William Ive	Member of Parliament for Leicester; 1625–1626; With: Thomas Jermyn 1625; Sir Humphrey May 1626	Succeeded by Sir Humphrey May; Sir John Stanhope
