= Ferdinando Hastings, 6th Earl of Huntingdon =

English politician (1609–1656)

Ferdinando Hastings, 6th Earl of Huntingdon (18 January 1609 – 13 February 1656), was the son of Henry Hastings, 5th Earl of Huntingdon, and Lady Elizabeth Stanley, the daughter of Ferdinando Stanley, 5th Earl of Derby, and Alice Spencer. He married Lucy, daughter of Sir John Davies, on 7 August 1623.

He was MP for Leicestershire in 1625 and again in 1628–29.

Ferdinando's family seat, Ashby de la Zouch Castle, was destroyed by Oliver Cromwell's troops in the English Civil War in 1646. He died of smallpox at age 47 and was succeeded by his son, Theophilus Hastings, 7th Earl of Huntingdon.

There is a monument to him in St Helen's Church, Ashby-de-la-Zouch.

Parliament of England
Preceded by Sir Thomas Hesilrige; Sir Henry Hastings	Member of Parliament for Leicestershire; 1625; With: Sir Wolstan Dixie	Succeeded by Francis Staresmore; Sir Henry Hastings
Preceded by Francis Staresmore; Sir Henry Hastings	Member of Parliament for Leicestershire; 1628–1629; With: Sir Edward Hartopp	Parliament suspended until 1640
Political offices
Preceded by The 5th Earl of Huntingdon	Lord Lieutenant of Leicestershire jointly with The 5th Earl of Huntingdon; 1638–1642	Vacant Title next held by The Lord Loughborough
Preceded by The 5th Earl of Huntingdon	Custos Rotulorum of Leicestershire; 1643–1655	Succeeded by The 7th Earl of Huntingdon
Preceded by The 5th Earl of Huntingdon	Lord Lieutenant of Rutland jointly with The 5th Earl of Huntingdon; 1638–1642	Vacant Title next held by The Viscount Campdon
Peerage of England
Preceded by Henry Hastings	Earl of Huntingdon; 1643–1655	Succeeded by Theophilus Hastings
Preceded by Henry Hastings	Baron Hastings (writ in acceleration); 1640–1655	Succeeded by Theophilus Hastings
