= Clopton House =

Country house in Warwickshire, England

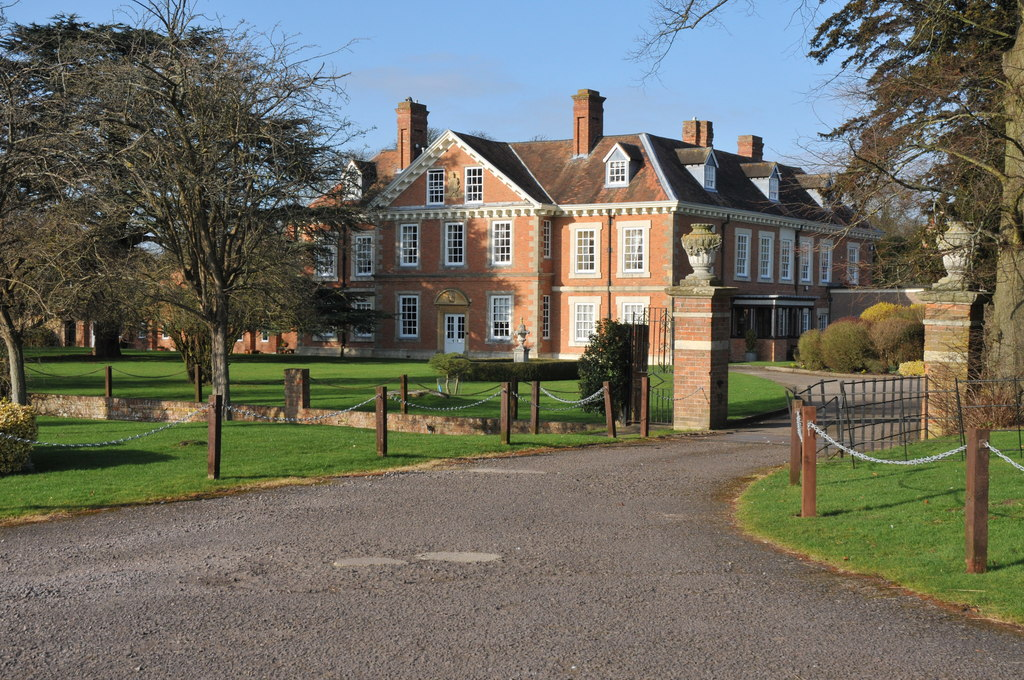
- Interactive map of Clopton House
- 52.2088°N 1.7080°W
- Location: Stratford upon Avon, Warwickshire, England

Listed Building – Grade II*
- Official name: Clopton House and attached former stable block, walls and gate piers
- Designated: 25 October 1951
- Reference no.: 1281110

Clopton House is a 17th-century country mansion near Stratford upon Avon, Warwickshire, now converted into residential apartments. It is a Grade II* listed building.

== History ==
The Manor of Clopton was granted to the eponymous family in the 13th century and in 1492 was owned by Hugh Clopton then Lord Mayor of London. In the late 16th century Joyce Clopton daughter of William Clopton (1538-1592), (a recusant Catholic), and heiress to the estate, married Sir George Carew (later Baron Carew and Earl of Totnes). They had no issue, and the estate fell to their nephew, Sir John Clopton. Thereafter the manor passed by marriage through the female line to the Partheriche, Boothby and Ingram families; the latter two changed their name to Clopton. In 1605 Ambrose Rookwood, a Gunpowder Plot conspirator, lived in the house.

The Cloptons sold the estate in 1824 to the Meynells, who sold it again in 1870 to George Lloyd of Welcombe House. His nephew Charles Thomas Warde (High Sheriff of Warwickshire in 1846) carried out the significant extensions of the 1840s.

In 1872 the estate was acquired by Sir Arthur Hodgson, High Sheriff in 1881. On the death of his son Rev Francis H Hodgson (FHH) in 1930 the estate was broken up.

== Architecture ==
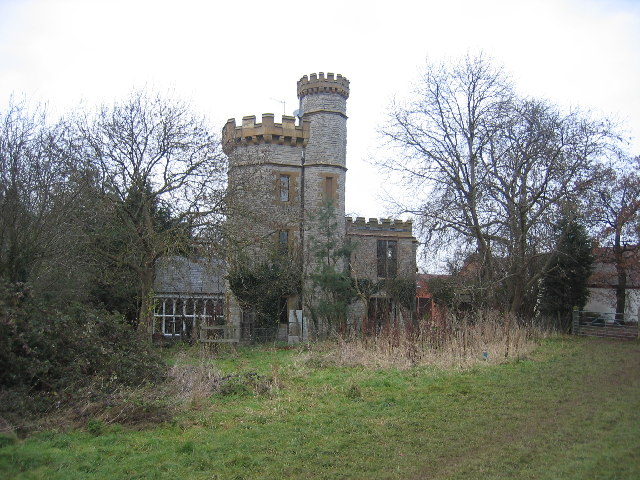
Clopton Tower

A manor house existing on the site in 1450 was owned by John Clopton, Alderman of the Trinity Guild of Coventry, and was rebuilt in the 16th century. The present house is a 17th-century creation by Sir John Clopton around the core of the 16th-century manor, with 19th-century extensions and improvements.

The south and east wings date from 1665 to 1670 in the Restoration style. The south front is two storied with attics and dormers. It has seven bays, the projecting central three being pedimented. The pediment over the entrance carries the Clopton family crest. The east wing is a similar but unpedimented seven bay range.

The earliest part of the house on the north was substantially rebuilt in the 1840s, with additions including the Grade II listed coachhouse and Clopton Tower, a Grade II listed belvedere in the grounds. The entrance porch bears an inscription FHH 1904, referring to the last resident owner, Francis Hodgson.
