= William Faunt =

16th-century English politician

- Coat of arms: Argent crusuly fitch a lion rampant Gules
- Born: 1495/1496; Foston, Leicestershire
- Died: 9 September 1559
- Spouse: Jane Vincent
- Issue: William Faunt; Anthony Faunt; Arthur Faunt; Vincent Faunt; Dorothy Faunt; Frideswide Faunt; Alice Faunt; Mary Faunt
- Father: William Faunt
- Mother: Isabel Sayer

William Faunt (1495/1496 – 1559), of Foston, Leicestershire, was an English politician.

He was a Member (MP) of the Parliament of England for Leicester in October 1553 Leicestershire in 1555. He married Jane Vincent, the daughter of George Vincent of Peckleton.

== Ancestry ==
Ancestors of William Faunt

William Faunt
William Faunt of Wistow
Isabel Maine
John Faunt of Wistow
Sir John Moulton
Joan Moulton
William Faunt
Sir John Clarenaulx
Thomas Clarenaulx
Isabel Richmond
Alice Clarenaulx
Robert Coniers of Stockborn
Alice Coniers
William Faunt of Foston
John Sayer
Isabel Sayer
