= Arthur Faunt =

English theologian

Laurence Arthur Faunt (1554 – 28 February 1591) was an English Jesuit theologian and missionary to Poland.

== Family background ==
Arthur Faunt was the third son of William Faunt of Foston, Leicestershire, by his second wife, Jane, daughter of George Vincent of Peckleton, and widow of Nicholas Purefoy of Fenny Drayton. The family was Roman Catholic. His nephews included Robert Burton and William Burton.

== Life ==
In 1568, Faunt was sent to Merton College, Oxford, and placed under the tuition of the philosopher John Pott, who previously taught him in Leicestershire. Pott, also a Roman Catholic, removed Faunt from Oxford with the consent of his parents, and at the beginning of 1570 took him to Louvain and placed him in the Jesuit college at the Catholic University.

After graduating B.A. at Louvain, Faunt lived for a time in Paris, and then proceeded to Munich in Germany. William V, Duke of Bavaria chose him as his scholar, and maintained him at the Munich Jesuit College there, where he studied for his Master’s degree. In 1575, he went to the English College at Rome to study divinity.

The date at which he entered the Society of Jesus is uncertain: some authorities give 1570, others 1575, the year in which he went to Rome. It was, however, at this time that he took Laurence as his name in religion. He was appointed reader in theology at the English College in 1578; and was ordained in 1580.

He attracted the attention of Pope Gregory XIII, who licensed Faunt to make a seal which would allow him to issue passports to his countrymen, enabling them to travel through foreign countries without fear of the Spanish Inquisition or any other similar danger. Pope Gregory died in 1585: it was supposed that had he lived longer, he would have raised Faunt to the rank of cardinal.

In 1581, King Stephen of Poland established a Jesuit college at Posen. Pope Gregory appointed Faunt to be its first rector, and he left Rome on 10 June 1581. Philippe Alegambe states that he was professor of Greek at Posen for three years, and of moral theology and controversy for nine years.

He was highly esteemed by the spiritual and temporal estates of the Polish nation. A letter sent by him to his brother Anthony, dated at Danzig in 1589, shows that he was sent for at the same time by three different princes.

== Death ==
Faunt died on 28 February 1591 at Vilnius, capital of the Grand Duchy of Lithuania (then part of the Polish-Lithuanian Commonwealth).

== Works ==
His theological works included:

- Assertiones Theologicæ de Christi in terris Ecclesia (Posen, 1580)
- Assertiones Theologicæ de Christi in terris Ecclesia, quaenam et penes quos existat ["Theological assertions of Christ's Church on earth, what are they and who may make them"] (Posen, 1584)
  - Tenenda est nobis Christiana religio, & eius Ecclesiæ communication, que Catholica est & Catholica nominator, non solùm à suis, verumentiam ab omnibus inimicis (Posen: Joannem Wolrab, 1582)
  - Libri tres: In quibus calvinianos, lutheranos, et cæteros, qui se evangelicos nominant, alienos à christi ecclesia esse, argumentis, signis, clarißimis demonstratur, & simul apologia assertionum eiusdem inscriptionis contra falsa Antonij Sadeelis criminationes continetur ["Book Three: In which Calvinists, Lutherans, and the rest, who call themselves Evangelicals, are, from arguments and miracles, most clearly proved to be outside the Christian Church, & simultaneously a defense of the same assertion against false accusations contained in the writing of Anthony Sadeel"] (Posen: Joannem Wolrab, 1584)
- Assertiones Rhetoricæ ac Philosophicæ, quæ in Coll. Posnaniensi Soc. Jes. an. 1582 in solemni studiorum renovatione disputandæ proponuntur (Posen, 1582)
- Disputatio Theologica de D. Petri et Romani Pontificis successoris ejus in Ecclesia Christi principatu (Posen, 1583)
- Doctrina Catholica de Sanctorum invocatione et veneratione (Posen, 1584)
- De Christi in terris Ecclesia, quænam et penes quos existat, libri tres. In quibus Calvinianos, Lutheranos et cæteros, qui se Evangelicos nominant, alienos à Christi Ecclesia esse … demonstratur, et simul Apologia Assertionum ejusdem inscriptionis contra falsas Antonii Sadeelis criminationes continetur (Posen, 1584)
- Coenae Lutheranorum et Calvinistarum oppugnatio ac catholicae Eucharitiae defensio (Posen, 1586)
- De Controversiis inter Ordinem Ecclesiasticum et Secularem in Polonia, ex iure diuino, Regniq. Statutis, Priuilegijs, ac Præscriptione Tractatio ([Cracow?], 1587); reprinted in 1632, and again in the Opuscula collected by Melchior Stephanidis (Cracow, 1632)
- Apologia libri sui de invocatione ac veneratione Sanctorum (Cologne, 1589)
- Tractatus de controversiis inter ordinem ecclesiasticum & secularem in Polonia (anon.) (1592)
- De Ordinatione et Vocatione Ministrorum Lutheranorum et Calvinistarum, eorumque Sacramentis (Posen)
- Oratio habita in Synodo Petrocoviensi Provinciali. De causa et remediis Hereseῶn
