= St Peter's Church, Aston Flamville =

Church in Leicestershire, England

Coordinates: 52°31′50″N 1°19′07″W

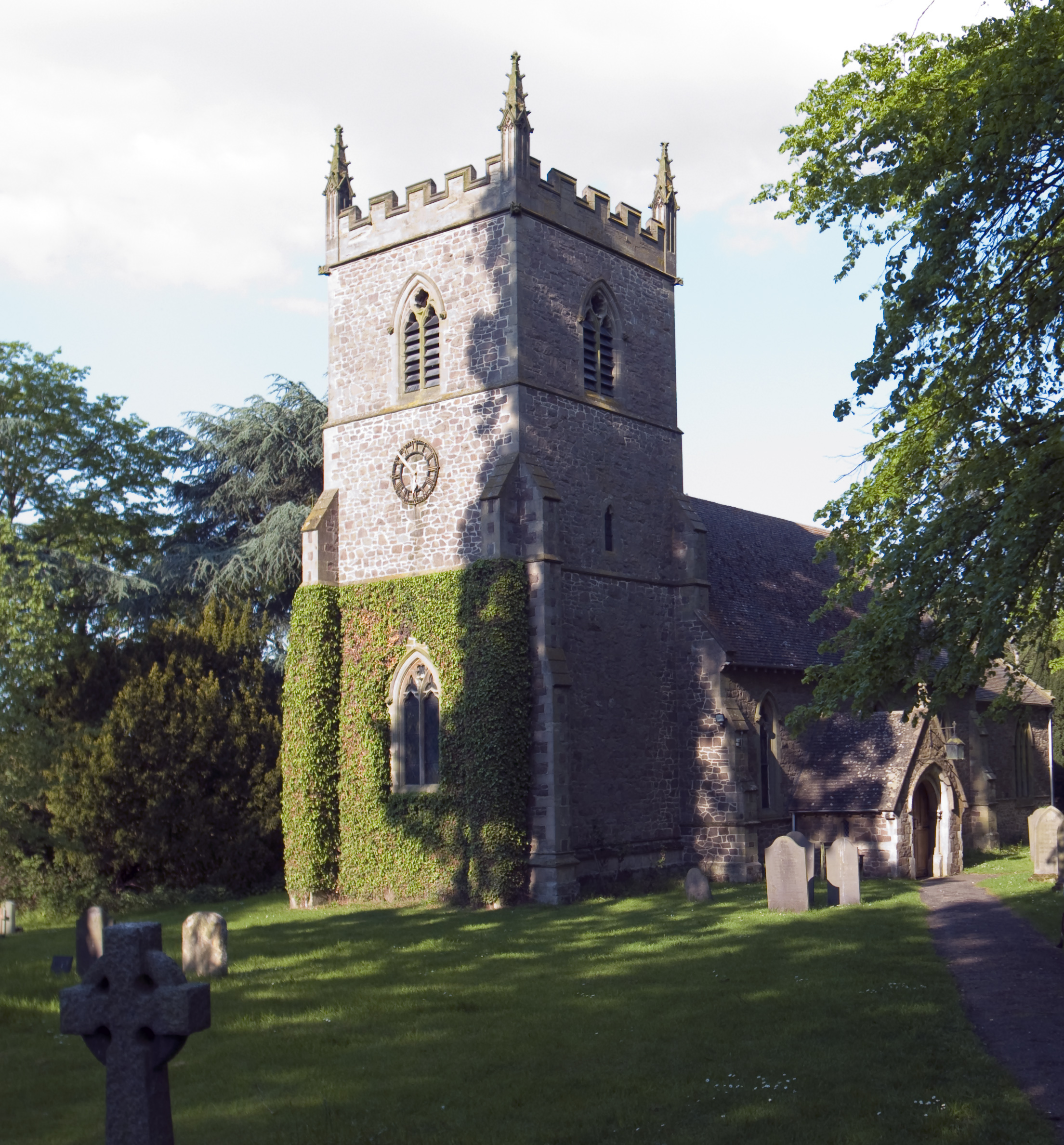
- Denomination: Church of England

History
- Dedication: St Peter

Administration
- Diocese: Leicester
- Archdeaconry: Loughborough
- Parish: Aston Flamville, Leicestershire

Clergy
- Rector: Andrew David Hall

St Peter's Church is a church in Aston Flamville, Leicestershire. It is a Grade II listed building.

== History ==
The church was built in the 11th century. It was possibly re-roofed in 1617.

The font is modern and depicts Elijah in a chariot and Moses striking the rock with his staff.

The tower contains two bells and is square, after being changed from its original shape.

The rectorial chair is set in the wall of the chancel. The chancel also has a memorial to Sir William Turville and his wife.

The church has no aisles but does have a step leading to the chancel, a rare feature since most churches have 2. A kneeling knight stands next to the step.

The chancel was restored in 1855 and in 1873, was rebuilt along with the porch, tower and nave.
