= William Flamville =

English politician

Sir William Flamville (c. 1325 – c. 1396), of Aston Flamville, Leicestershire, was an English politician.

He was the only son of Sir William Flamville of Aston Flamville and was knighted before November 1362.

He was a Member (MP) of the Parliament of England for Leicestershire from 1362 to 1391. He was escheator for Warwickshire and Leicestershire for 1376–77 and 1389–90 and was appointed High Sheriff of Warwickshire and Leicestershire for 1379–80 and 1388–89.

He married twice: firstly Katherine, with whom he possibly had 2 sons and secondly Hawise, the widow of Sir Hugh Meynell of Kings Newton, Warwickshire and Langley Meynell, Derbyshire, with whom he had a daughter. Aston Flamville manor passed to his son William.
