= Thomas Walsh (MP for Leicestershire) =

Member of the Parliament of England

Sir Thomas Walsh (before 1346 – 1397/8) was an English soldier, landowner and politician.

== Background and family ==
The Walsh (Waleys, Wallshe) family was first mentioned in connection with Wanlip in 1248. Thomas was born before 1346, the second son of Sir John Walsh and his wife Alice Cliff. He is the subject of a detailed and extensively-referenced biography that can be consulted at History of Parliament Online.

Thomas and his wife Katherine had the following children, who are not necessarily all listed in order of their age:

- William
- John
- Thomas
- Margaret – married Sir Thomas Gresley
- Elizabeth – married Sir Thomas Boyville
- Richard

== Career ==
Thomas was part of the retinue of John of Gaunt, when the English army devastated the Pays de Caux in the summer of 1369. The numerous official positions that he held included:

- 1373 – Commissioner to distribute tax relief in Leicestershire
- 1375 – Escheator of Warwickshire and Leicestershire
- 1379 – Surveyor of tax assessments
- 1382 – Responsibility for putting down rebellion
- 1394 – Constable of Leicester Castle

He was a justice of the peace in Leicestershire in 1381–1382 and 1390–1394 and Steward of the Duchy of Lancaster in Leicestershire, Northamptonshire, Nottinghamshire, Rutland and Warwickshire from 1392.

Thomas sat as a Member of Parliament for Leicestershire fifteen times between 1371 and January 1397.

== Death and monument ==
Thomas was still living in January 1396/7, when he transferred property at Little Walton at Monks Kirby, Warwickshire and at Leicester and other places in Leicestershire to his son in law Thomas Gresley for the sum of £100, subject to an annuity of £29 yearly being paid to Walsh for the remainder of his life. Thomas Gresley did not have to pay the annuity for long, as his father in law had died by December 1398.

Sir Thomas was buried in Wanlip church, which he and his wife had rebuilt in 1393. The inscription on their monument, which takes the form of a brass set into the floor of the chancel reads:

Here lyes Thomas Walssh knyght lorde of Anlep and dame Katine his wife whiche in her tyme made the kirke of Anlep and halud the kirkyerd first in Wurchip of god and of oure lady and seynt Nicholas that god have her soules and mercy anno domini millesimo CCC nonagesimo tercio

This brass is the subject of a detailed article by Nigel Saul, who has commented that it is the earliest extant example of an English inscription on a high-status tomb monument.
