= Biddulph (disambiguation) =

Biddulph is a town in England.

Biddulph may also refer to:

- Biddulph (surname)
- Baron Biddulph
- Biddulph baronets
- Biddulph Recordings
- Lucan Biddulph, township
