= James Bellers =

English politician

James Bellers (fl. 1376–1422) was an English politician. He sat as MP for Leicestershire in May 1413 and 1420.

He also served as escheator in Warwickshire and Leicestershire from 9 December 1408 till 7 November 1409 and 3 November 1412 till 10 November 1413; justice of the peace for Rutland from 28 January 1412 till his death, Leicestershire from 8 February 1412 till December 1414, 18 February 1415 till June 1418, and 3 July 1420 till his death; sheriff of Rutland from 12 November 1414 till 11 February 1416, and 16 November 1420 till his death; commissioner of inquiry in Leicestershire in March 1417 concerning a complaint made by the prior of Ulverscroft; commissioner of array in May 1418; and commissioner to raise royal loans in November 1419.

He was the son of Sir James Bellers by his first wife Lettice, the daughter and heiress of Walter Prest and half-brother of John Bellers. Before 1411, he married Margery (before 1392 – after 1445), the daughter and eventual heiress of Theobald Ward by Amy, the daughter and heiress of Sir William Burgh.
