= William Belgrave =

English politician

William Belgrave (fl. 1399–1416) was an English politician. He sat as MP for Leicestershire in May 1413.

He was the son and heir of John Belgrave. He married a woman who was possibly Isabel, the daughter of William Sandon and with her he had two sons.

He also served as Duchy of Lancaster bailiff of Sileby and Belgrave by 1399 till before Michaelmas 1412; receiver of the duchy honour of Leicester in Leicestershire and Warwickshire by 1414 till before February 1416.
