= George Vincent (MP) =

Member of the Parliament of England

George Vincent or Vyncent (c.1493 – 3 January 1566) was a member of the English landed gentry from Peckleton in Leicestershire, who served one term as a "knight of the shire" (i.e., MP) for Leicestershire in 1558.

== Background ==
Vincent was born by 1493, the first son of Richard Vincent of Messingham, Lincolnshire by Anne (Grimsby), who was the daughter and heiress not only of her father (William Grimsby of Lincoln) after her brother's death, but also coheir through her mother to the Motons of Peckleton (an important Leicestershire family). Vincent was educated in the Inner Temple being admitted in 1519.

== Personal life ==
By 1517, he had married Jane Story, daughter of William Story of Sleaford, by whom he had seven sons and two daughters; by 1542, he married one Anne (Radcliffe) Lache, a widow of Daventry in Northants; and he finally married Amy Colles of Preston Capes, by whom he had two more sons and one daughter. He succeeded his father some time before 1515.

Vincent served as a local magnate in various offices(he was a justice of the peace from 1538 to his death). He was a political ally and beneficiary of Richard Sacheverell (whose niece Jane Story was Vincent's first wife) and thus allied with the Hastings family against the Greys of Ruthin. He led a Leicestershire contingent in the vanguard against France in England's French campaign of 1544.

== Parliament ==
In 1558 he was returned to Parliament for the first and only time, succeeding William Faunt in that office; Faunt would later marry one of his daughters by his first wife Jane. It is speculated that he owed this position in part to patronage from Sir Edward Hastings, who had recently been elevated to the peerage and was Lord Chamberlain of the Royal Household. In 1559, his seat in the Commons went to Adrian Stokes, the new husband of Frances Grey, Duchess of Suffolk.

== Afterwards ==
Vincent died 3 January 1566, leaving his third wife Amy still alive. He made provisions in his will for sons Edward [the eldest], Clement, Gilbert, Robert (these four were to serve as his executors), Peter and Philip; and daughter Jane. The will also provided "for that I have been a justice of peace and a meddler in the hundred of Sparkenho" 20 shillings for "each great town and parish within the said hundred", and 20 pence for the "least" [towns] would be paid from the proceeds of his holdings in Marston. (A commission was later issued in to compel Edward to administer the estate, "because the executors refused the burden of the execution of the same.")
