= Bartholomew Brokesby =

Member of the Parliament of England

Bartholomew Brokesby (died 1448) was a lawyer and steward who served twice as sheriff of Warwickshire and Leicestershire (1411–1413, then again in 1419). He was also elected to the Parliament of England several times.

His older brother, William Brokesby, previously served the same role, and was Marshall of the hall of Henry IV. Records indicate Bartholomew served more closely in the house of Thomas Arundel, and was gifted a velvet-bound bible in two volumes when the Archbishop died.

Royal orders given in June 1415 assigned a half dozen archers to Brokesby, implying he may have been present at the Battle of Agincourt.
