= Ælfwine of Warwick =

Arden of Park Hall coat of arms.

Ælfwine of Warwick was a Sheriff of Warwickshire under William the Conqueror, and one of the few Anglo-Saxons to retain their lands after the conquest. He died before 1087.

== Family ==
His mother was Erminhild de Warwick and his father was Wigod de Wallingford, Earl of Wallington and a descendant of both Egbert III of England, and Charles Martel.

His wife was Horne and children were:

- Turchill of Kinsbury de Warwick also known as Thorkell of Arden who was a knight and Earl of Warwickshire, who married Leverunia, Countess of Perche and widow of Arnulph, Earl of Perche, and through whom was the progenitor of the Arden family in Warwickshire. He held 52 lordships in County Warwick. He died c.1080, in the 14th year of the reign of William the Conqueror.
- Leofstan
- Gudmund

His sister Ealdgyth was the wife of Robert d'Oilly, who succeeded him as Sheriff.

== Estates ==
He was the owner of Ryton-on-Dunsmore, an estate assessed at 3½ hides and including woodland half a league by 2 furlongs, and a mill worth 12s. and a benefactor of Coventry Abbey.
