= Francis Hastings (died 1595) =

English politician

Francis Hastings (1560–1595), of Old Place, near Ashby Castle, Leicestershire, was an English politician.

He was a member (MP) of the parliament of England for Leicestershire in 1593.
