= George Turpin (MP) =

16th-century English politician

Sir George Turpin (1529–1583), of Knaptoft, Leicestershire and London, was an English Member of Parliament.

He was the younger son of John Turpin of Knaptoft. He succeeded his brother in 1551 and was knighted 21 August 1566.

He was elected a Member (MP) of the Parliament of England for Leicestershire in November 1554, 1563 and 1572. He was a Justice of the Peace for Leicestershire and was appointed High Sheriff of Warwickshire and Leicestershire for 1565 and High Sheriff of Leicestershire only for 1574.

He married Frances, the daughter of Sir Robert Lane of Horton, Northamptonshire, with whom he had a son, William, and a daughter.
