= Sir Edward Hartopp, 1st Baronet =

English Member of Parliament

Sir Edward Hartopp (1572–1655) was an English Member of Parliament.

== Early life ==
He was the son of yeoman William Hartopp, of Freeby (Freathby), Leicestershire. He succeeded his brother Thomas in 1604, inheriting thereby the manor of Freeby.

== Career ==
He served in the army as a Captain of Foot in the Low Countries from 1598 to 1599 and was afterwards a captain of militia foot (by 1614 to 1616). In 1614 he bought Buckminster, Leicestershire, which became his seat and was appointed High Sheriff of Leicestershire for 1617–18.

In 1628 he was elected knight of the shire (MP) for Leicestershire and was created a baronet on 3 December 1619. During the Civil War he sided with the Parliamentarians and his estate was seized by the Royalists.

== Death and family ==
He was buried at Buckminster on 10 January 1655. He had married Mary, the daughter of Sir Erasmus Dryden, 1st Baronet, of Canons Ashby, Northamptonshire. They had five sons and four daughters. His son Edward fought for Parliament as a regimental commander in the Civil War. His daughter, Elizabeth, married Montague Cholmeley (b. 7 Mar 1615).

Parliament of England
| Preceded by Sir Henry Hastings; Francis Staresmore | Member of Parliament for Leicestershire; 1628–1629; With: Ferdinando, Lord Hastings | Parliament suspended until 1640 |
Baronetage of England
| New creation | Baronet (of Freathby); 1619–1655 | Succeeded by Edward Hartopp |
