= Huntingdon Beaumont =

British entrepreneur (1560?-1624)

Huntingdon Beaumont (c.1560–1624) was an English coal mining entrepreneur who built two of the earliest wagonways in England for trans-shipment of coal. He was less successful as a businessman and died having been imprisoned for debt.

Beaumont was the youngest of four sons born to Sir Nicholas Beaumont and his wife Ann (Saunders). They were an aristocratic family in the English East Midlands. There were several branches to the Beaumont dynasty and this was the one based at Coleorton in Leicestershire. He was therefore of gentleman status in the formal Elizabethan sense. The family owned coal bearing lands and worked them. Beaumont was involved in this coal working and eventually he began working in his own right in the Nottingham area. In 1603/04, during his partnership with Sir Percival Willoughby, Lord of the Wollaton Manor, Beaumont constructed the Wollaton Wagonway. 21st century research has established that this is not the world's first wagonway with edged rails, but the earliest known specific documentary evidence relates to it and so it was attributed as such by earlier writers. The wagonway ran from Strelley, where Beaumont held mining leases, to Wollaton Lane.

Beaumont was a successful coal prospector and an innovator in the development of mining techniques. A key innovation currently attributed to him is the introduction of boring rods to assist in finding coal without sinking a shaft. His working life covered involvement in coal mining activities in Warwickshire, Leicestershire, Nottinghamshire and Northumberland. His coal mining and waggonway activities in the early 1600s near Blyth in Northumberland were, like most of his ventures, unprofitable but the boring rod and wagonway technology he took with him was implemented by others to significant effect. The wagonway chain he started in the English north east was to later influence George Stephenson. A major coal seam in the region was named the Beaumont Seam, commemorating his engineering efforts there.

Beaumont lost considerable sums of money borrowed from friends and family. He died in Nottingham Gaol in 1624 having been imprisoned for debt. Smith (1957) hypothesised Beaumont's business management decisions were reckless, the losses directly attributable to his mismanagement. New (2014) outlines a different perspective; Beaumont took over the Wollaton coal operation when it was almost worked out and facing closure, he applied what were for the time appropriate management actions delaying for 20 years what hindsight identifies was inevitable failure.

== Sources ==
- Smith, R. S. (1957), "Huntingdon Beaumont Adventurer in Coal Mines", Renaissance and Modern Studies, 1: 115–153, doi:10.1080/14735785709366320
- Smith, R. S. (1960), "England's First Rails : A reconsideration", Renaissance and Modern Studies, 4: 119–134, doi:10.1080/14735786009391434
- King, P. (2010), "The First Shropshire Railways", in Boyes, G. (ed.), Early Railways 4, Sudbury: Six Martlets Publishing, pp. 70–84
- Lewis, M. J. T. (1970), Early Wooden Railways, London: Routledge Keegan Paul (out of print)
- Smith, R. S. (1989), Early Coal Mining Around Nottingham 1500–1650, University of Nottingham (out of print)
- New, J. R. (2004), "400 years of English railways – Huntingdon Beaumont and the early years", Backtrack, 18 (11): 660–665
- New, J. R. (2014), "Wollaton or Broseley? The gap narrows", in Gwyn, Dr D. (ed.), Early Railways 5, Sudbury: Six Martlets Publishing, pp. 1–11
