= Samuel Biddulph =

English cricketer

Samuel Biddulph (23 December 1840 – 7 March 1876) was an English professional cricketer who played for Nottinghamshire County Cricket Club as a wicket-keeper between 1862 and 1875. He played in 176 first-class cricket matches, the majority for the county side and MCC.

Biddulph was born at Hyson Green in Nottingham in 1840 and is first recorded playing for the village cricket side in 1858. He made his Nottinghamshire debut in 1862 and from 1863 was employed as a professional by MCC. He was regarded as an effective wicket-keeper and was described as having "quickness of sight, execution and indomitable courage". He frequently umpired, including in first-class matches.

Outside of cricket, Biddulph was married and employed as a lacemaker. He was forced to retire from cricket in 1875 due to a disease of the kidneys, and died the following year aged 35.
