= John Blaket =

15th-century English politician

Sir John Blaket (died 1430) was the member of Parliament for the constituency of Leicestershire for the parliaments of 1407, 1410, and April 1414. He was also the member for Gloucestershire for the parliament of December 1421.
