= Birdingbury Hall =

17th-century country house in Warwickshire, England

Coordinates: 52.3146°N 1.3671°W

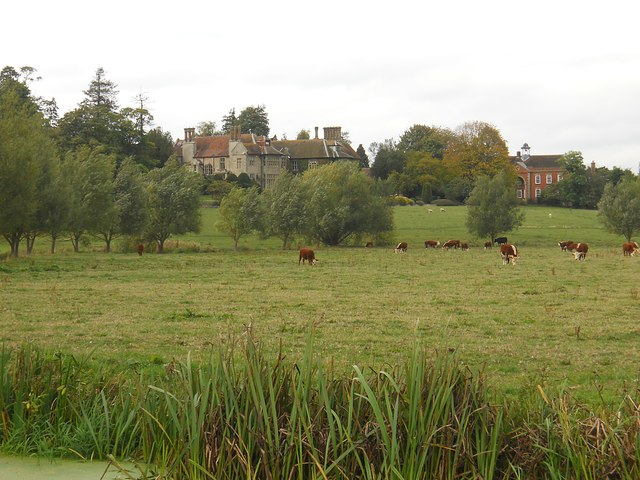
Birdingbury Hall

Birdingbury Hall is a 17th-century country house situated at Birdingbury, near Rugby, Warwickshire. It is a Grade II listed building and now serves as the head office of a commercial organisation.

== Details ==
The manor of Birdingbury was held in ancient times by the Priory of Coventry. After the Dissolution of the Monasteries it was acquired by the Throckmorton family. In 1674, it was sold to Sir Charles Wheler Bt. and in 1687 to the Biddulph family. Parish records show the Hall to be owned by Thomas Blyth, lime and cement manufacturer, in 1891 through to his death in 1896. During this time, there were eight family members supported by resident teacher, cook, three house maids and two parlour maids. Prior to Birdingbury Hall, Blyth resided previously at Stockton House, Stockton, Warwickshire.

The house was built in about 1630 but was extensively remodelled and rebuilt following a fire in 1859. The Jacobean style house has two storeys with attics. The east entrance front has an imposing Tuscan porch.

It now belongs to the Whiston family who have occupied it for over 10 years.
