= Thomas Berkeley (died 1488) =

15th-century English Member of Parliament and sheriff

Sir Thomas Berkeley
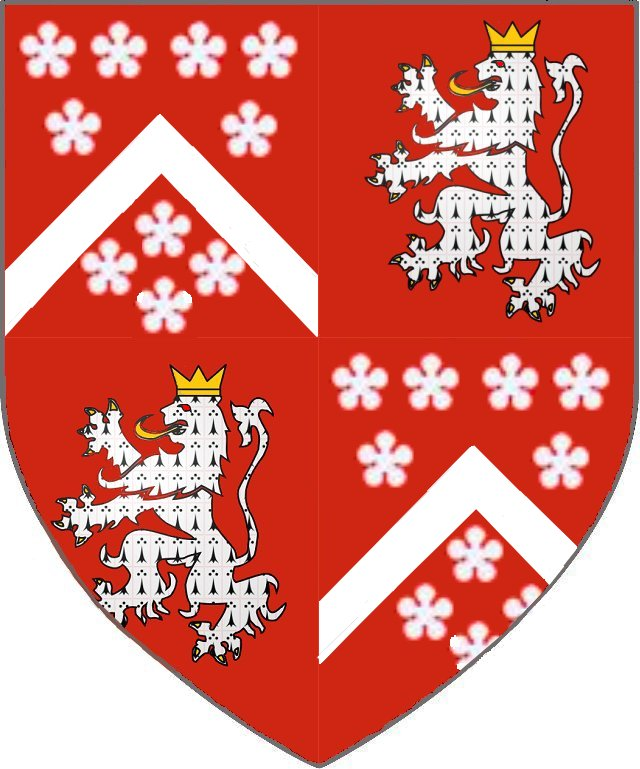
- Berkeley of Wymondham arms:- Quarterly. 1&4: gules, a chevron between ten cinquefoils argent. BERKELEY: 2&3: gules, a lion rampant ermine, crowned or. HAMELYN.

Sheriff of Rutland
- In office 1443–1444
- Monarch: Henry VI

Sheriff of Warwickshire and Leicestershire
- In office 1454–1455
- Monarch: Henry VI

M.P. for Leicestershire
- In office 1472–1475
- Monarch: Edward IV

Personal details
- Born: Wymondham, Leicestershire
- Died: 1488
- Spouse: Emma/Petronella Brokesby
- Children: Maurice Berkeley; Lawrence Berkeley; Elizabeth Berkeley; Edith Berkeley; Joyce Berkeley ? Berkeley
- Parent(s): Sir Laurence Berkeley & Joan Woodford

Sir Thomas Berkeley of Wymondham, Leicestershire (died 1488) was an English lawyer, soldier and politician. He represented Leicestershire in Parliament and served as Sheriff for Rutland, Warwickshire and Leicestershire.

== Ancestry ==
Berkeley was the eldest son of Laurence Berkeley of Wymondham, Leicestershire, who died in France in 1458, and wife Joan Woodford, sister of the Agincourt veteran Robert Woodford of Sproxton, Leicestershire, Knight Banneret. He was a member of the House of Berkley.

Berkeley was the great-great-grandson of Thomas Berkeley of Coston, Leicestershire, second son of Thomas de Berkeley, 1st Baron Berkeley, and his wife Joan de Ferrers (d. 1309), daughter of William de Ferrers, 5th Earl of Derby.

Berkeley moved to Wymondham after marrying Isabel Hamelin, daughter of Sir John Hamelin of Wymondham, and niece of Sir William de Hamelin. (Note: John Hamelin's great grandfather William Hamelyn is thought to have gone on the Third Crusade with Richard the Lionheart. He is now thought to be the knight represented in a stone effigy in Wymondham church and not, as Nicholls suggested, the John Hamelyn who only appears to have taken part in the Scottish wars.) Their coat of arms was later transmitted to the Hamlyn baronets.

== Career and Life ==
Berkeley was a Justice of the Peace for Leicestershire from 1442 to 1458, and Sheriff of Rutland between 1443 and 1444. He was admitted as a Fellow of Lincoln's Inn in 1449 by special admission.

In December 1457, Berkeley was appointed as one of Leicestershire's Commissioners of Array. The commissioners raised 226 archers to help repel Richard, Duke of York's Yorkist rebellion and again in 1459. Berkeley was knighted by November 1460—perhaps having taken part in the Battle of Northampton, When the Battle of Towton ended Henry VI's reign, Berkeley accepted Edward IV as King.

Towards the end of 1465, Berkeley became involved in a dispute with John Bourchier over the wardship and marriage of the underage grandson of former member of parliament Manser Marmion, whom Berkeley was accused of abducting. The Marmion estate was composed of over 2,500 acres spread over several counties. As well as being an attractive prize, it was owned by way of a complex set of homages and services to multiple overlords. It would seem Berkeley won and later wed his daughter Edith to the Marmion heir.

In 1468, Berkeley accused William Purley of entering his land two years earlier and stealing 20 hares, 200 rabbits, 12 pheasants and 20 partridges using swords, bows, and arrows. Purley was either found not guilty or let off for some reason as he appears to have later married Berkeley's daughter Joyce.

Berkeley was appointed as Sheriff of Rutland in 1471 and as a Justice of the Peace for Rutland in 1470–1475. Berkeley served in Parliament for Leicestershire between 1472 and 1475.

Berkeley died in 1488. He is buried in an alabaster topped altar tomb with his wife Petronella in St Peter's Church, Wymondham.

== Family ==
Berkeley married Emma/Petronella Brokesby or Brooksby, daughter of William Brokesby, Marshall of the King's Hall, and wife Joan Alderwick, and had the following issue:

- Sir Maurice Berkeley, died 30 November 1522, son and heir.
- Lawrence Berkeley
- Elizabeth Berkeley, died 1504, married William Hussey, Chief Justice of the King's Bench.
- Edith Berkeley, died 23 October 1538, married Mauncer Marmion, (Sheriff of Lincolnshire in 1497) and buried in a tomb together in Rippingale Church.
- Joyce Berkeley, died 1530, married William Purley.
- a daughter who married someone surnamed Gaton.

Berkeley was an ancestor of Henry Berkeley, 1st Baronet of Wymondham.
