= William Brokesby =

14th and 15th-century English royal official, member of Parliament, and sheriff

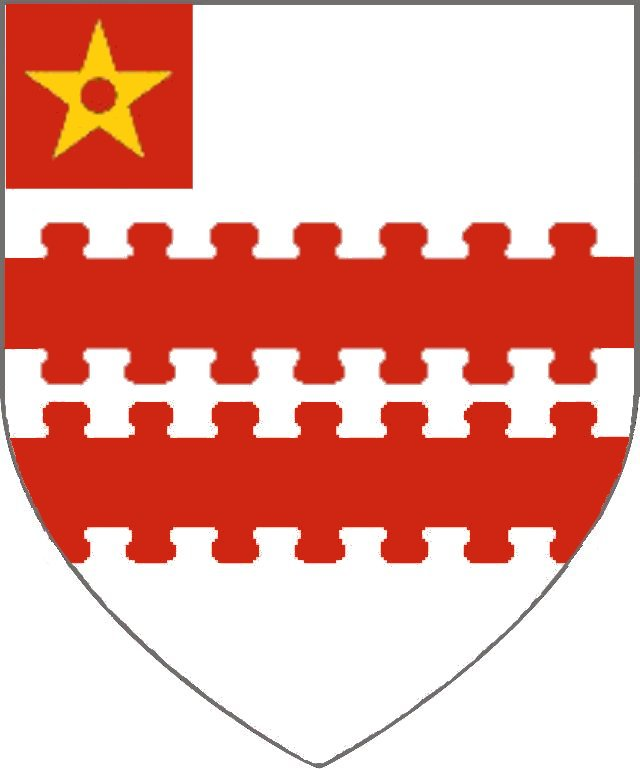
- Brokesby of Shoby arms:- argent, 2 bars nebuly gules, on a canton gules a mullet pierced or.

Marshall of the Kings Hall
- In office 7 November 1401 – March 1413
- Monarch: Henry IV

M.P. for Leicestershire
- In office 14 January 1404 – October 1404
- Monarch: Henry IV

Sheriff of Warwickshire and Leicestershire
- In office 1404, 1409 – 1409
- Monarch: Henry IV

Personal details
- Died: before 23 February 1416
- Spouse: Joan Alderwick
- Children: Henry Brokesby, Emma/Petronella Brokesby
- Parent(s): John Brokesby & Agnes

William Brokesby or Brooksby of Shoby, Leicestershire was Marshall of Henry IV's Hall, represented Leicestershire in Parliament and was Sheriff of Warwickshire and Leicestershire.

== Early life ==
Brokesby was the son of John Brokesby or Brooksby of Shoby, Leicestershire, and wife Agnes Frisby, from whom he inherited the manor of Shoby, Leicestershire, and also the advowson of Saxelby church.

== Career ==
Brokesby served in Henry IV's household as early as 1400 and served as Marshall of the Kings Hall from 7 November 1401 on.

Brokesby accompanied Henry's eldest daughter Princess Blanche to her marriage with Louis III, Count Palatine of the Rhine, at Cologne Cathedral on 6 July 1402, which was arranged to forge an alliance between England and Germany.

Brokesby represented Leicestershire in the Parliament of January 1404, acted as sheriff of the same county later that year and again in 1409.

In 1405 Brokesby mustered men from Leicestershire and led them north to help quash the rebellion of Richard le Scrope, Archbishop of York.

After the death of Henry IV, Brokesby continued service in the Royal Household and was listed as one of the "13 hensemen de Roy" in Henry V's entourage that accompanied him to his victory at Agincourt. His younger brother Bartholomew was also granted half a dozen archers in June 1415, and was presumed to be present, if not in the royal circle.

Brokesby died before 23 February 1416, perhaps due to an injury or sickness picked up in the Agincourt campaign.

== Family ==
Brokesby married Joan Alderwick, daughter of William Alderwick of Aldridge, Staffordshire, and had the following issue:

- Henry Brokesby, son and heir m. Edith Bracebridge of Kingsbury, Warwickshire. Retainer of Joan de Beauchamp, Baroness Bergavenny.
- Emma or Petronella Brokesby m. Sir Thomas Berkeley of Wymondham, Leicestershire

Brokesby's younger brother Bartholomew Brokesby also served repeatedly as M.P. for Leicestershire, and was appointed sheriff of Leicestershire and Warwickshire in 1411.
