= Wollaton Wagonway =

Railway using horses to pull coal wagons

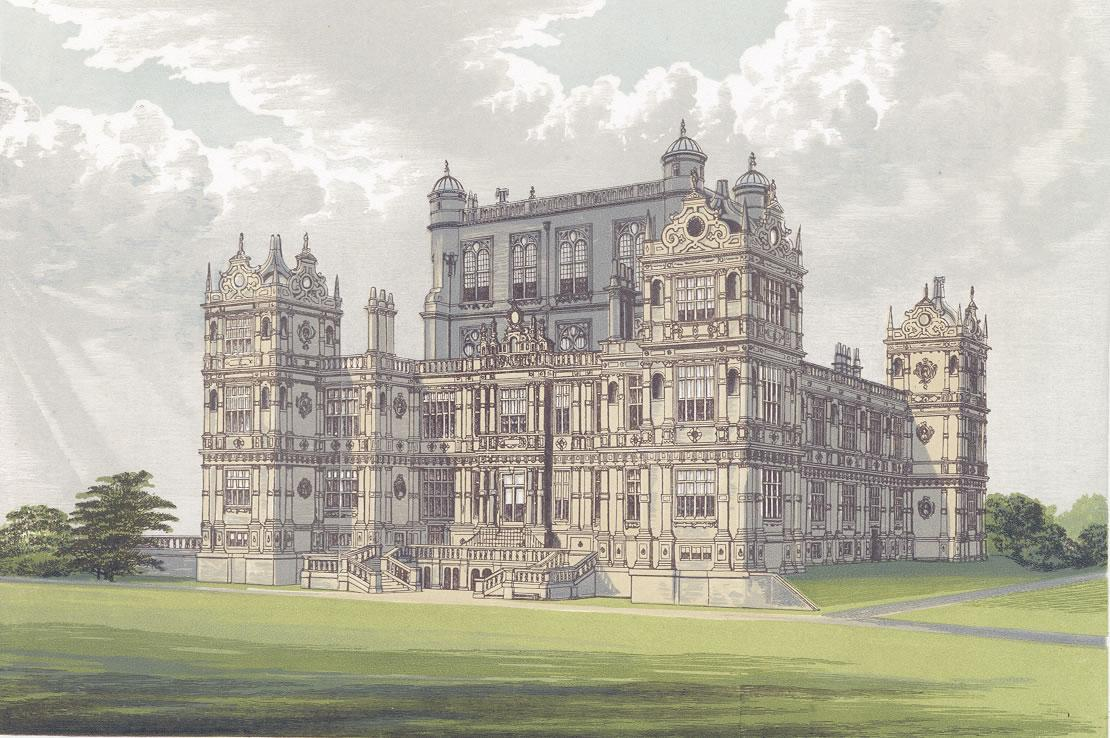
Wollaton Hall near the Southern terminus of the Wollaton Wagonway

The Wollaton Wagonway (or Waggonway), built between October 1603 and 1604 in the East Midlands of England by Huntingdon Beaumont in partnership with Sir Percival Willoughby, was the first railway in Britain, excluding systems using a guided pin, and therefore, is regarded as a significant step in the development of railways. Until recently, its primacy as the first English wooden railway was in doubt without a definitive answer.

alonge the passage now laide with railes, and with suche or the lyke Carriages as are now in use for the purpose.

The above is from Sir Percival Willoughby's agreement with Huntingdon Beaumont dated 1 October 1604. Sir Percival was Lord of the manor of Wollaton and Huntingdon Beaumont was the lessee of the Strelley coal pits. They worked the Strelley mines in an equal partnership.

Comparatively little is known of the wagonway. It cost £172 (equivalent to £48,228 in 2025), and ended at Wollaton Lane End, from where most of the coal was taken onwards by road to Trent Bridge and then downstream on the River Trent by barge. The wagons or carriages were drawn by horses on wooden rails. The Strelley mines were worked only until about 1620, by which time all readily recoverable coal had probably been mined. The wagonway was presumably then abandoned.

The success of the Wollaton Wagonway led to Huntingdon Beaumont building other wagonways for his other mining leases near Blyth in Northumberland. A continuous evolution of railways can be traced back to the Wollaton Wagonway.

== See also ==
- History of introduction of wooden rails
- Diolkos
