= Thomas Brokesby =

16th-century English politician

Thomas Brokesby (by 1483–1544 or later), of the Inner Temple, London and Leicester, was an English politician.

He was a member (MP) of the parliament of England for Leicester in 1529 and Leicestershire 1542.
