= Robert Woodford =

Robert Woodford may refer to:

- Robert J. Woodford (born 1936), American Latter Day Saint historian and writer
- Robert Woodford (diarist) (1606–1654), English lawyer and diarist
