= Howard Biddulph =

Canadian political scientist

Howard Lowell Biddulph (28 March 1935 – 23 May 2022) born in Rexburg, Idaho, was a political scientist whose work focused on the government of the Soviet Union. At various times, he was a faculty member at Brigham Young University (BYU), University of Victoria, and Rutgers University.

As a young man Biddulph served as a Mormon missionary in the Canadian mission, based in Toronto and covering eastern Canada from 1955 to 1957. He earned his bachelor's degree at Brigham Young University and received his master's degree and Ph.D. from Indiana University Bloomington, where he wrote his dissertation on "Karl Marx's Early Thought in the Soviet Union". Biddulph began his academic career as a professor at Rutgers University. He was chair of the political science department at the University of Victoria. After his time as mission president Biddulph was a professor at BYU. In that position he led many study abroad tours to Ukraine.

Biddulph was the first president of the Victoria British Columbia Stake of the Church of Jesus Christ of Latter-day Saints (LDS Church) and the first president of the church's Ukraine Kiev Mission, where he oversaw the opening of missionary work in Ukraine. In the LDS Church, Biddulph has also been a bishop, counselor in a mission presidency and Regional Representative of the Quorum of the Twelve among several other callings in the church.

Biddulph and his wife Colleen are the parents of five children.

Biddulph also wrote the book The Morning Breaks (Salt Lake City: Deseret Book, 1996). Articles by Biddulph include the 1983 article "Local Interest Articulation at CPSU Congress", "Soviet Intellectual Dissent as a Political Counter Culture" in Western Political Quarterly, Volume 25, Number 3, pages 522-533, "Religious Liberty and the Ukrainian State: Nationalism Versus Equal Protection" in BYU Law Review, 1995 and "Religious Participation of Youth in the USSR" in Europe-Asia Studies, Volume 31, Issue 3 (July 1979) pages 417-433.
