= Basil Brooke (Leicestershire MP) =

English MP

Sir Basil Brooke, of Lubenham (died 12 November 1612) represented Leicestershire in parliament 1607-1610.

Basil Brooke of Lubenham was the son of Sir Andrew Brooke of Monks Kirby, Warws., a Gentleman Usher to Queen Mary and third son of Thomas Brooke of Leighton, Cheshire. His father inherited Lubenham and Milton Malsor through his great-uncle, Henry Brooke, chief clerk of the Green Cloth and follower of John Dudley, 1st Duke of Northumberland. Basil succeeded his father in 1569. In 1581 he sold Milton Malsor to William Goodere.

He was appointed Escheator of Warwickshire and Leicestershire in 1597 and was a justice of the peace for Leicestershire from 1601 to at least 1608. He was knighted at the accession of James I in 1603 and served as High Sheriff of Leicestershire for 1605 (Feb to Nov).

He was elected knight of the shire for Leicestershire in a by-election on 28 May 1607 following the death of Sir Henry Beaumont. His estate was not large (in 1608 he stated that his Lubenham estate brought him £300 per annum) and he experienced financial difficulties. His election to parliament is thus surprising and was presumably due to a link to the Grey family.

He died on 12 November 1612 and was buried at Lubenham.

He had married Goodeth, the daughter of Sir William Feilding of Newnham Paddox, Warwickshire and had 3 sons. In 1624 his son Thomas sold Lubenham to Sir Ranulph Crewe.
