= Peckleton =

Village in Leicestershire, England

Coordinates: 52.606°N 1.306°W

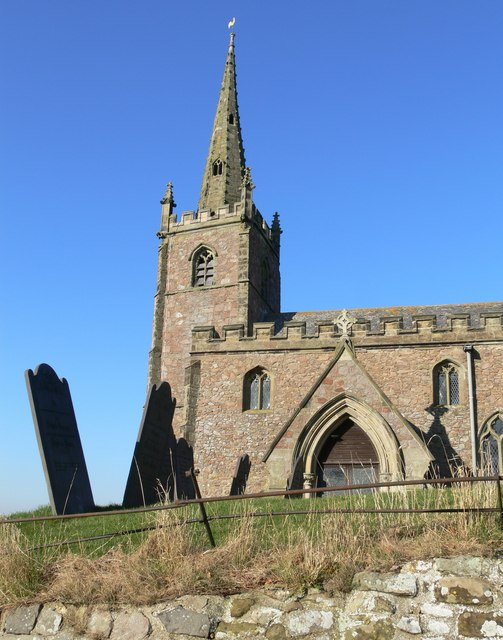
- St Mary Magdalene's Church

- Location within Leicestershire
- Population: 1,067 (2011)
- OS grid reference: SK4701
- Civil parish: Kirkby Mallory, Peckleton and Stapleton
- District: Hinckley and Bosworth
- Shire county: Leicestershire
- Region: East Midlands
- Country: England
- Sovereign state: United Kingdom
- Post town: Leicester
- Postcode district: LE9
- Police: Leicestershire
- Fire: Leicestershire
- Ambulance: East Midlands
- UK Parliament: Hinckley and Bosworth

Peckleton is a village in the civil parish of Kirkby Mallory, Peckleton and Stapleton, in the Hinckley and Bosworth district of Leicestershire, England. The villages of Kirkby Mallory and Stapleton also form part of the parish. Thus, according to the 2001 census, the parish had a population of 1,077, falling slightly to 1,067 at the 2011 census. Due east of the village is Peckleton Common, adjacent to The Glebe Fisheries, an angling centre of excellence completed in 1996. The local church, St Mary Magdalene, is located just south of the village centre.

Notable residents of Peckleton include George Vincent (MP), heir (through his mother) to the Moton family which held the manor of Peckleton for centuries; and descendants of Charles Henry Bennett, illustrator to Charles Darwin and Lewis Carroll.

== Civil parish ==
On 1 April 1935 the parishes of Kirkby Mallory and Stapleton were merged with Peckleton, the merged parish was renamed "Kirkby Mallory, Peckleton and Stapleton" on 1 April 2023. In 1931 the parish of Peckleton (prior to the merge) had a population of 283.
