= Welcombe Hotel =

Hotel in Stratford-upon-Avon, Warwickshire, England

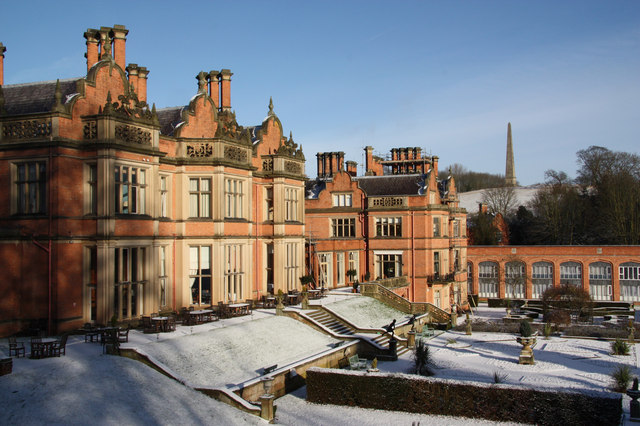
- Interactive map of Welcombe Hotel
- Location: Stratford-upon-Avon, Warwickshire, England
- Coordinates: 52.2085°N 1.6963°W

Listed Building – Grade II*
- Official name: Welcombe Hotel
- Designated: 9 February 1972
- Reference no.: 1052288

Listed Building – Grade II
- Official name: Stable block immediately to north of Welcombe Hotel
- Designated: 4 April 1994
- Reference no.: 1052229

Welcombe Hotel occupies a 19th-century former country mansion house near Stratford upon Avon, Warwickshire, which was previously known as Welcombe House. It is a Grade II* listed building.

== History ==
Some of the lands at Welcombe, which are recorded as part of the manor of Old Stratford, date as far back as 1182 AD.

The estate ultimately came into the possession of the Clopton family, into which one of William's three daughters, Martha, had married. Various conveyances of the lands took place in the 18th century and at one point — between 1760 and 1768 — they were divided into three parts. The estate had been acquired by John Lloyd of Snitterfield by 1777 (Note: John Lloyd was born on 18 April 1735 and died on 8 June 1777; he was a Fellow of the Royal Society, as his father, George, had also been.) and it later passed to his oldest son, George, who lived there until dying at the age of 63 in 1831. Both of John Lloyd's sons, George and John Gamaliel Lloyd, served as High Sheriff of Warwickshire, in 1806 and 1832, respectively. George having died unmarried, John Gamaliel inherited the estate on the death of his brother. In turn, the new owner died unmarried in 1837.

== Construction ==
By 1842, the estate was in the hands of Mark Philips, a Manchester businessman and member of parliament. Philips was High Sheriff in 1851. In about 1866 he commissioned Thomas Newby to build a new mansion house in a Neo-Jacobean style to designs by architect Henry Clutton. This project was completed in 1869. Philips died in 1873, leaving the estate of almost 3,400 acres (14 km^{2}) to his brother, Robert Needham Philips. In 1876 he erected a 120 feet (37 m) sandstone obelisk at a cost of £7,000. The structure, which is now Grade II listed, stands on high ground and is visible for many miles around. On Robert's death in 1890, the property was inherited by Caroline, his daughter, who married Sir George Otto Trevelyan. Their third son, eminent Cambridge historian, George Macaulay Trevelyan, was born at Welcombe House in 1876 and later described it:

It was one of those enormous country mansions with which the wealthy Victorian bourgeoisie loved to burden their newly purchased estates. Welcombe house was, indeed, only a few years older than I was, though it was long ere I grasped that disillusioning fact.

== Hotel ==
George Otto Trevelyan died in 1928, aged 90, and the house was bought by the London, Midland and Scottish Railway. The railway company significantly altered and extended the buildings and opened them as a hotel on 1 July 1931. The company briefly used a Ro-railer to transport people from the station to the hotel, but it was soon phased out as being bumpy and uncomfortable.

Bought and operated from the 1990s by Menzies Hotels Group, it was converted it into a spa and golf club occupying an estate of 157 acres (0.64 km^{2}). After Menzies were bankrupted in summer 2012, the hotel was one of 12 sold to Topland Group. It was operated by Bespoke Hotels before being acquired by Conquer Dawn in 2021 with Michels & Taylor taking over operations of the hotel.
