= John Burnet Biddulph =

South African explorer (1796-1837)

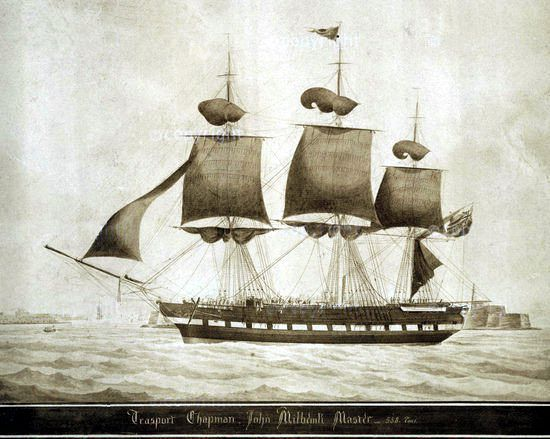
The convict and 1820 Settler ship "Chapman"

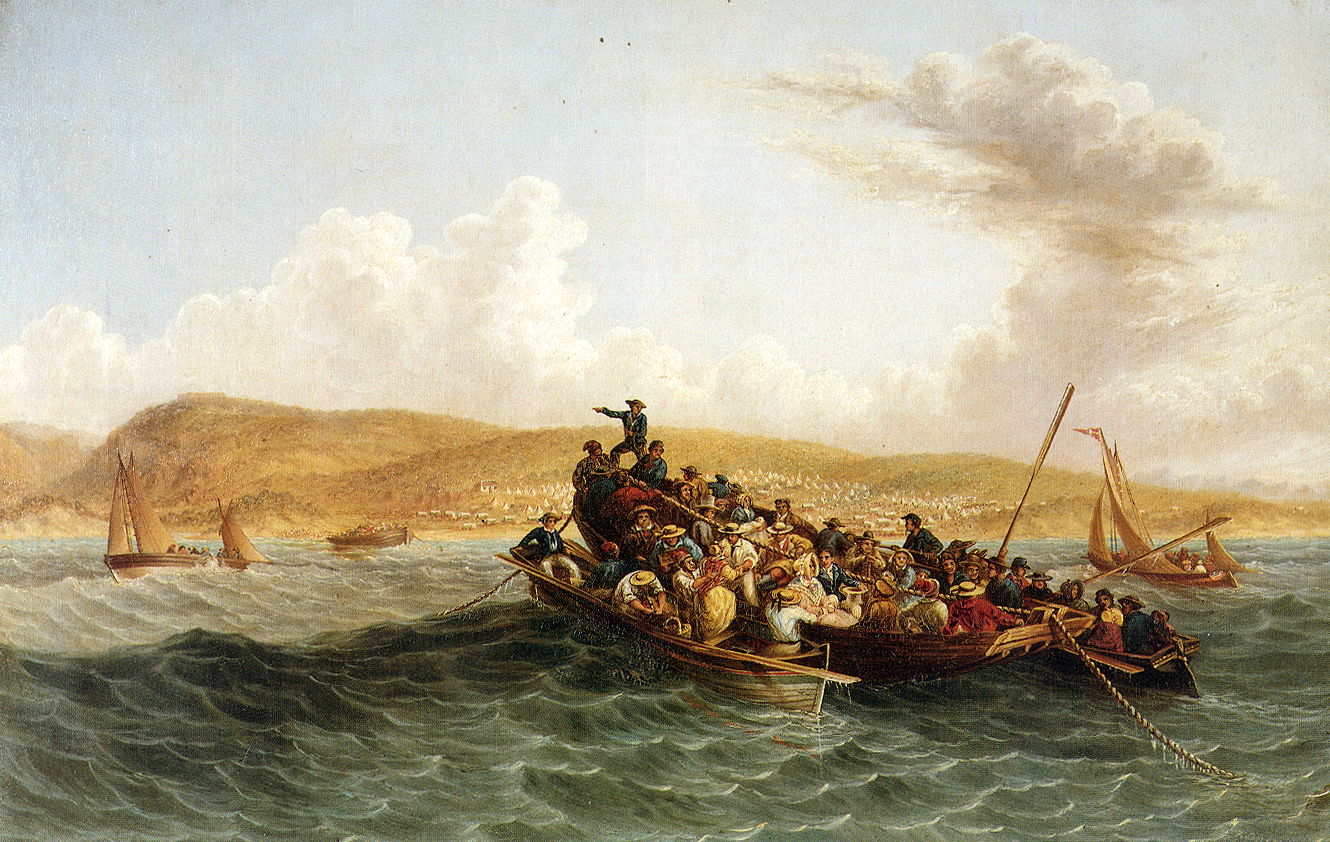
"Settlers Coming Ashore" - Thomas Baines

John Burnet Biddulph (10 December 1796 Wigginton, Staffordshire – 3 March 1837 Graaff-Reinet) was a Cape Colony explorer and trader who arrived with the 1820 Settlers.

Midshipman John Biddulph joined Lieutenant John Bailie's party aboard the convict transport Chapman under Captain John Milbank and the ship sailed from Gravesend, Kent on 3 December 1819. Also on board were his father Simon Biddulph (17 May 1761 Tamworth, Staffordshire – 5 January 1842 Bathurst, Eastern Cape), his mother Ann Burnet (August 1765 – 10 February 1844), and his siblings Louisa (24), William (14) and Frances (12). After anchoring in Table Bay on 17 March 1820, the ship was placed under quarantine because of an epidemic of whooping-cough on board which led to the deaths of six children. Captain Milbank went ashore to marry one of his passengers, Sarah Eliza Reed. The Chapman was the first Settler ship to arrive in Algoa Bay on 10 April 1820.

Landdrost Cuyler from Uitenhage escorted the group to about midway between Bathurst and the mouth of the Great Fish River, where sixty-four one-acre (0.40 ha) lots were allocated them, Simon Biddulph receiving a separate grant of land, Birbury. The Biddulphs were a wealthy family and were regarded as 'gentleman settlers'. They were accompanied by indentured servants, and had capital to invest in enterprises at the Cape.

Andrew Geddes Bain bought property in Graaff Reinet in 1822 and became friendly with Biddulph. In 1825 they set off from Graaff Reinet with three wagons, six Hottentot assistants and a Bushman interpreter. Their main objective was the "Mines of Mileta" in Bechuanaland where rumour had it there were valuable deposits of iron and copper. They also hoped to trade goods such as beads and tobacco for ivory, but were disappointed. On reaching Kuruman they enjoyed the hospitality of the missionary Robert Moffat, father-in-law of David Livingstone. They explored further north and reached Dithubaruba in Bechuanaland, becoming the first recorded Europeans to return safely from so far north.

Three years later saw them on another trading expedition. Leaving from Grahamstown, they travelled through the Bantu territories to Natal Province. Returning through Bechuanaland they reported seeing "beads of virgin gold". Financially it was a successful trip, and they returned with large amounts of ivory. Bain wrote of the expedition in the South African Commercial Advertiser of 26 September 1829, the first published account of the country beyond the Great Fish River. It gave a colourful description of the country near the Keiskamma River, Gonubie, the Great Kei River, Umtata, Umngazi River and the Umzimvubu Mountains. The expedition had crossed the Umzimvubu River valley in June 1829, becoming only the second group of Europeans to have done so.

== Marriage and children ==
On 2 April 1825 at Graaff-Reinet, John Biddulph married Wilhelmina Theodora Elizabeth Wahlstrand (c. 1802 – 11 April 1843 Birbury, Bathurst). They had six children.

1. James Henry Biddulph (c. 1821–unknown)
2. Gilbert Burnet Biddulph (1822–unknown) married Frances Ann Dyason (1819–1894)
3. Ernst Wahlstrand Biddulph (c. 1825 – April 1888 Johannesburg, Gauteng, South Africa)
4. John Edward Biddulph (6 May 1829/15 November 1829 Bathurst – 20 November 1909) married Fanny Tunbridge at Sundays River, Port Elizabeth
5. Thomas Biddulph (c. 1830–unknown)
6. Charles Henry Biddulph (c. 1832–unknown)
