= Leicestershire (constituency) =

Parliamentary constituency in the United Kingdom, 1801–1832

- Former county constituency for the House of Commons
- County: Leicestershire

1290–1832
- Seats: Two
- Replaced by: North Leicestershire and South Leicestershire

Leicestershire was a county constituency in Leicestershire, represented in the House of Commons. It elected two Members of Parliament (MPs), traditionally called Knights of the Shire, by the bloc vote system of election, to the Parliament of England until 1707, to the Parliament of Great Britain from 1707 until 1800, and then to the Parliament of the United Kingdom until 1832.

== History ==
The constituency was abolished by the Reform Act 1832 for the 1832 general election, when it was replaced by the Northern and Southern divisions, each of which elected two MPs.

Both divisions were abolished by the Redistribution of Seats Act 1885 for the 1885 general election, when they were replaced by four new single-seat constituencies: Bosworth, Harborough, Loughborough and Melton.

== Members of Parliament ==
=== 1290–1640 ===
Parliament	First member	Second member
1290	William Hamelyn	Robert Burdet
1295	Robert de Wyvill	John Aungerville
1297	Sir Thomas de Meynill	Sir William Burdet of Loseby
1300	John Aungerville	John Folville
1301	John Aungerville	John Folville
1302	Robert Ponterel	John Folville
1305	John Aungerville	Robert Ponterel
1306	John Aungerville	Sir John Folville
1307 (Jan)	Sir William Marmion	Richard de Perrers
1307 (Oct)	Sir John Aungerville	Sir William Marmion
1309	Henry de Erdington	Richard de Edgebaston
1311 (Aug)	Richard de Perrers	John de Bakepuz
1311 (Nov)	Richard de Perrers	John de Bakepuz
1312	Ralph de Sacheville	John Aungerville
1313	Sir William Brabazon	Henry de Nottingham
1314	William Trussell	John de Houby
1315	Robert de Wyvill	Ralph de Sacheville
1316 (Jan)	Ralph Folville	Richard de Edgebaston
1316 (Jul)	Ralph Folville	Richard de Edgebaston
1318	Ralph Folville	John de Olney
1319	Henry de Nottingham	Robert de Gaddesby
1320	William de Neville	Ralph Mallory
1321	Ralph de Sacheville	William de Kaythorp
1322 (May)	Hugh de Prestwold	Richard de Edgebaston
1322 (Nov)	Robert de Gaddesby	William Jaunville
1324 (Jan)	Ralph de Sacheville	Nicholas Payne
1324 (Oct)	Sir Robert Burdet	Roger la Zouch
1325	Ralph Beler	Roger de Belgrave
1327 (Jan)	Sir Robert Burdet	Sir William Moton
1327 (Sep)	Roger de Belgrave	Robert de Sadyngton
1328 (Feb)	Roger de Gaddesby	Robert de Sadyngton
1328 (Apr)	Robert Burdet	Robert de Sadyngton
1328 (Jul)	Ralph de Sacheville	Robert de Waltham
1329	Ralph de Sacheville	Jordan de Garthorp
1330 (Mar)	William Moton	Robert Burdet
1330 (Nov)	Robert Burdet	Richard de Edgebaston
1331	Roger la Zouch	William de Staunton
1332 (Mar)	Richard de Edgebaston	Ralph de Sacheville
1332 (Sep)	Philip de Folville	Alan Talbot
1333	Alan Talbot	John de Knighton
1334 (Feb)	John de Knighton	Simon Pakeman
1334 (Sep)	Richard de Edgebaston	Hugh Turville
1335	William Moton	William de Bredon
1336 (Mar)	William de Bredon	Hugh Turville
1337 (Mar)	William Moton	Hugh Turville
1337 (Sep)	Roger la Zouch	William Moton
1338 (Feb)	Hugh Turville	Roger de Belgrave
1338 (Jul)	William Moton	Nicholas Charnels
1339 (Feb)	William Moton	John de Farrington
1339 (Oct)	William Moton	Robert de Waltham
1340 (Jan)	Nicholas Charnels	Richard de Shelton
1340 (Mar)	John de Boyville	Thomas de Whelesbergh
1340 (Jul)	Richard de Edgebaston	
1341	John Waleys	Nicholas Charnels
1343	William Moton	
1344	Thomas Charnels	John Hakelut
1346	Simon Pakeman	Robert de Kegworth
1348 (Jan)	John Waleys	Simon Pakeman
1348 (Mar)	Roger Waleys	Robert de Gaddesby
1351	John Paynel	John de Levere
1352 (Jan)	William de Bredon	Geoffrey de Villiers
1352 (Aug)	Robert de Willoughby	
1353	Thomas Malesores	
1354	Thomas Malesores	John Paynel
1355	Sir Nicholas Charnels	Sir Thomas Malesores
1357	Thomas Malesores	Mathew de Folville
1358	Sir John Paynel	Sir Thomas Malesores
1360	Thomas de Chaworth	John Charnels
1361	Philip de Nevill	John Talbot
1362	Sir William Flamville	John Talbot
1363	Robert de Herle	Roger de Belers
1365	Ralph de Hastings	Simon Pakeman
1366	Sir William Flamville	Simon Pakeman
1368	John Talbot	Simon Pakeman
1369	John Talbot	Thomas Oudeby
1371	William Flamville	William Taillard
1372	John Berkeley	William de Burgh
1373	John Talbot	Robert Digby
1376	Sir William Flamville	Ralph Bellers
1377 (Jan)	Sir William Flamville	Ralph Bellers
1377 (Nov)	Sir William Flamville	John Bellers
1378	Edmund Appleby	Thomas de Erdington
1379	Thomas Walsh	Sir Roger Perwych
1380 (Jan)	John Burdet	John Fauconer
1380 (Nov)	Thomas Walsh	Laurence Hauberk
1381	Thomas Walsh	Sir William Flamville
1382 (May)	Thomas Walsh	Sir William Flamville
1382 (Oct)	John Neville	John Perwich
1383 (Feb)	Thomas Walsh	John Fauconer
1384 (May)	Sir William Flamville	Edmund de Appleby
1384 (Nov)	Thomas Walsh	John Fauconer
1385	John Calveley	John Fauconer
1386	Sir William Flamville	Sir Thomas Walsh
1388 (Feb)	Sir William Flamville	Sir Thomas Walsh
1388 (Sep)	Sir William Flamville	Sir Roger Perwych (d. Oct 1388)
1390 (Jan)	John Burdet	Sir Thomas Walsh
1390 (Nov)	Robert Langham	Sir Thomas Walsh
1391	Sir William Flamville	Sir Thomas Walsh
1393	Sir Robert Harrington	Sir Hugh Shirley
1394	Sir Robert Harrington	Sir Thomas Walsh
1395	Nicholas Colman	Sir Thomas Walsh
1397 (Jan)	Edmund Bugge	Sir Thomas Walsh
1397 (Sep)	Sir John Calveley	Sir Henry Neville
1399	Thomas Mandeville	Sir Thomas Maureward
1401	Thomas Derby	Sir John Neville
1402	Sir John Berkeley	Sir Henry Neville
1404 (Jan)	Sir William Brokesby	Edmund Bugge
1404 (Oct)	Sir John Berkeley	Robert Veer
1406	Sir John Neville	Sir Henry Neville
1407	John Blaket	Robert Sherard
1410	John Blaket	Bartholomew Brokesby
1411	Sir John Berkeley	Sir Thomas Maureward
1413 (Feb)		
1413 (May)	James Bellers	William Belgrave
1414 (Apr)	Thomas Ashby	John Blaket
1414 (Nov)	James Bellers	Richard Hotoft
1415		
1416 (Mar)		
1416 (Oct)		
1417		
1419	Thomas Ashby	William Mallory
1420	James Bellers	Sir Ralph Shirley
1421 (May)	John Burgh	Richard Hotoft
1421 (Dec)	Sir Laurence Berkeley	Sir William Trussell
1422	Robert Moton	Bartholomew Brokesby
1423	Thomas Foulehurst	John Boyville
1424	Bartholomew Brokesby	Baldwin Bugge
1425	John Boyville	Baldwin Bugge
1426	John Boyville	Bartholomew Brokesby
1428	Everard Digby	Bartholomew Brokesby
1430	Sir Laurence Berkeley	Thomas Foulehurst
1433	Thomas Palmer	John Burgh
1439	Richard Hotoft	Thomas Palmer
1441	Thomas Palmer	Richard Neel
1446	Richard Hotoft	Thomas Staunton
1448	Thomas Everingham	Thomas Palmer
1450	Richard Hotoft	William Feilding
1451	John Beler	Robert Staunton
1453	Thomas Everingham	John Boyville
1455	Laurence Hastings	Thomas Palmer
1460	William Feilding	John Whatton
1467	Thomas Palmer	Robert Staunton
1472	William Trussell	Sir Thomas Berkeley
1477	William Trussell	William Moton
1510–1515	No names known	
1523	?Sir Richard Sacheverell	?
1529	Sir Richard Sacheverell, died 1534	Sir William Skeffington, died 1535
by 1536	?William Asby	
1536	?William Ashby	?
1539	Sir John Villers	John Digby
1542	Sir Richard Manners	?Thomas Brokesby
1545	Sir Ambrose Cave	Robert Burdett
1547	Edward Hastings	Sir Ambrose Cave
1553 (Mar)	Edward Hastings	Sir Ambrose Cave
1553 (Oct)	Robert Strelley	Sir Thomas Hastings
1554 (Apr)	Sir Thomas Hastings	Henry Poole
1554 (Nov)	Sir Thomas Hastings	George Turpin
1555	William Faunt	William Skeffington
1558	George Vincent	George Sherard
1559 (Jan)	Adrian Stokes	Francis Cave
1562–1563	Nicholas Beaumont	George Turpin
1571	Francis Hastings	Adrian Stokes
1572 (Apr)	(Sir) George Turpin	Nicholas Beaumont
1584	George Hastings, 4th Earl of Huntingdon	Francis Hastings
1586	George Hastings, 4th Earl of Huntingdon	Francis Hastings
1588 (Oct)	Sir Henry Beaumont	William Turpin
1593	Francis Hastings	Thomas Skeffington
1597	Sir Edward Hastings	Sir Francis Hastings
1601	Henry Hastings	William Skipwith
1604	Sir George Villiers	Thomas Beaumont
1606	Sir George Villiers	Sir Henry Beaumont of Coleorton
1607	Sir George Villiers	Sir Basil Brooke of Lubenham
1614	Sir George Hastings	Sir Thomas Hesilrige
1621–1622	Sir George Hastings	Sir Henry Hastings
1624	Sir Thomas Hesilrige	Sir Henry Hastings
1625	Ferdinando Lord Hastings	Sir Wolstan Dixie
1626	Sir Henry Hastings	Francis Staresmore
1628–1629	Sir Edward Hartopp	Ferdinando, Lord Hastings
1629–1640	No Parliament convened	

=== 1640–1832 ===
Year	First member	First party	Second member	Second party
Apr 1640	Sir Arthur Hesilrige		Hon. Lord Grey of Ruthyn	
Nov 1640	Sir Arthur Hesilrige		Henry Smith	

Parliament	First member	Second member	Third member	Fourth member
1653	Henry Danvers	Edward Smith	John Prat	3 seats only
1654	Thomas Beaumont	Henry Grey, 1st Earl of Stamford	Lord Grey of Groby	Thomas Pochin
1656	Thomas Beaumont	Francis Hacker (of Okeham)	William Quarks	Thomas Pochin

Year	First member	First party	Second member	Second party
1659	Sir Thomas Beaumont, 1st Baronet		Francis Hacker	
1660	Thomas Merry		Matthew Babington	
1661	Lord Roos election declared void Apr 1679		George Faunt	
Feb 1679	Lord Roos election declared void Apr 1679		The Lord Sherard	
Apr 1679	Sir John Hartopp		John Coke	
Aug 1679	Sir John Hartopp		The Lord Sherard	
Feb 1681	Sir John Hartopp		The Lord Sherard	
1685	John Verney		The Lord Sherard	
1689	Sir Thomas Halford		The Lord Sherard	
1690	Sir Thomas Hesilrige		The Lord Sherard	
1695	John Verney		George Ashby	
1698	John Verney		John Wilkins	
1701	Lord Roos		The Lord Sherard	
1702	John Verney		John Wilkins	
1707	George Ashby		John Wilkins	
1708	Sir Geoffrey Palmer		Sir Gilbert Pickering	
1710	Sir Geoffrey Palmer		The Marquess of Granby	
1711	Sir Geoffrey Palmer		Sir Thomas Cave	Tory
1713	Viscount Tamworth	Tory	Sir Thomas Cave	Tory
1714	Sir Geoffrey Palmer		Sir Thomas Cave	Tory
1719	Sir Geoffrey Palmer		Lord William Manners	Whig
1722	Edmund Morris	Tory	Lord William Manners	Whig
1727	Sir Clobery Noel	Tory	Lord William Manners	Whig
Feb 1734	Ambrose Phillipps	Tory	Lord William Manners	Whig
May 1734	Ambrose Phillipps	Tory	Edward Smith	
1738	Lord Grey		Edward Smith	
1739	Lord Guernsey		Edward Smith	
1741	Sir Thomas Cave		Edward Smith	
1747	Wrightson Mundy		Edward Smith	
1754	Sir Thomas Palmer		Edward Smith	
1762	Sir Thomas Palmer		Sir Thomas Cave	
1765	Sir John Palmer		Sir Thomas Cave	
1774	Sir John Palmer		Thomas Noel	
1775	Sir John Palmer		John Peach-Hungerford	
1780	William Pochin		John Peach-Hungerford	
1790	William Pochin		Sir Thomas Cave	
1792	William Pochin		Penn Assheton Curzon	
1797	William Pochin		George Anthony Legh-Keck	
1798	Sir Edmund Cradock-Hartopp		George Anthony Legh-Keck	
1806	Lord Robert William Manners		George Anthony Legh-Keck	
1818	Lord Robert William Manners		Charles March Phillipps	
1820	Lord Robert William Manners		George Anthony Legh-Keck	
1831	Charles March-Phillipps		Thomas Paget	Whig
1832	Great Reform Act: constituency abolished			
