= Biddulph baronets =

Title in the Baronetage of England

Arms: Vert an Eagle displayed argent; Crest: A Wolf rampant argent wounded on the shoulder proper

The Biddulph Baronetcy, of Westcombe in the County of Kent, is a title in the Baronetage of England. It was created on 2 November 1664 for Theophilus Biddulph, of Westcombe Park, Greenwich, Kent, Member of Parliament for the City of London and Lichfield. His son, Michael, the second Baronet, also represented Lichfield in the House of Commons. This line of the family failed on the death of the second Baronet's son, Theophilus, the third Baronet, in 1743. The late Baronet was succeeded by his first cousin once removed and namesake, Theophilus, the fourth Baronet. He was the son of Edward Biddulph, elder son of Simon Biddulph, younger son of the first Baronet. His grandson, Theophilus, the sixth Baronet, fought in the Battle of Waterloo and served as High Sheriff of Warwickshire in 1849. He was succeeded by his son, Theophilus, the seventh Baronet. He was a Deputy Lieutenant and Justice of the Peace for Warwickshire. On the death of his son, Theophilus, the eighth Baronet, in 1948, the line of Edward, elder son of Simon Biddulph, younger son of the first Baronet, failed. The late Baronet was succeeded by his fourth cousin once removed, Francis, the ninth Baronet. He was the great-great-grandson of Walter Biddulph, younger son of Simon Biddulph. As of 2008 the title is held by his grandson, Jack, the eleventh Baronet, who succeeded his father in 1986. The three most recent baronets have resided in Australia.

Michael Biddulph, 1st Baron Biddulph, was a descendant of Anthony Biddulph, uncle of Sir Theophilus Biddulph, 1st Baronet, of Westcombe (see Baron Biddulph for more information on this branch of the family).

== Biddulph baronets, of Westcombe (1664) ==
- Sir Theophilus Biddulph, 1st Baronet (1612–1683)
- Sir Michael Biddulph, 2nd Baronet (1654–1718)
- Sir Theophilus Biddulph, 3rd Baronet (1683–1743)
- Sir Theophilus Biddulph, 4th Baronet (1720–1798). Biddulph was the son of Edward Biddulph of Birdingbury Hall, Birdingbury, Warwickshire (whose father Simon Biddulph was the fourth son of Sir Theophilus Biddulph, 1st Baronet). He was educated at University College, Oxford matriculating 26 June 1736 at age 16, and inherited the baronetcy on the death of his second cousin 16 May 1743. Biddulph married Jane Biddulph, a cousin, and was succeeded by his son Theophilus. Buried 26 March 1798 at Birdingbury, aged 78.
- Sir Theophilus Biddulph, 5th Baronet (1757–1841)
- Sir Theophilus Biddulph, 6th Baronet (1785–1854)
- Sir Theophilus Biddulph, 7th Baronet (1830–1883)
- Sir Theophilus George Biddulph, 8th Baronet (1874–1948)
- Sir Francis Henry Biddulph, 9th Baronet (1882–1980)
- Sir Stuart Royden Biddulph, 10th Baronet (1908–1986)
- Sir Ian (Jack) D'Olier Biddulph, 11th Baronet (1940–2024)
- Sir Paul William Biddulph, 12th Baronet (born 1967)

The heir presumptive to the baronetcy is Michael Andrew Biddulph (born 1964), second cousin of the 12th Baronet.

== See also ==
- Baron Biddulph
