= Aston Flamville =

Rural village in Leicestershire, England

Coordinates: 52.530990°N 1.319453°W

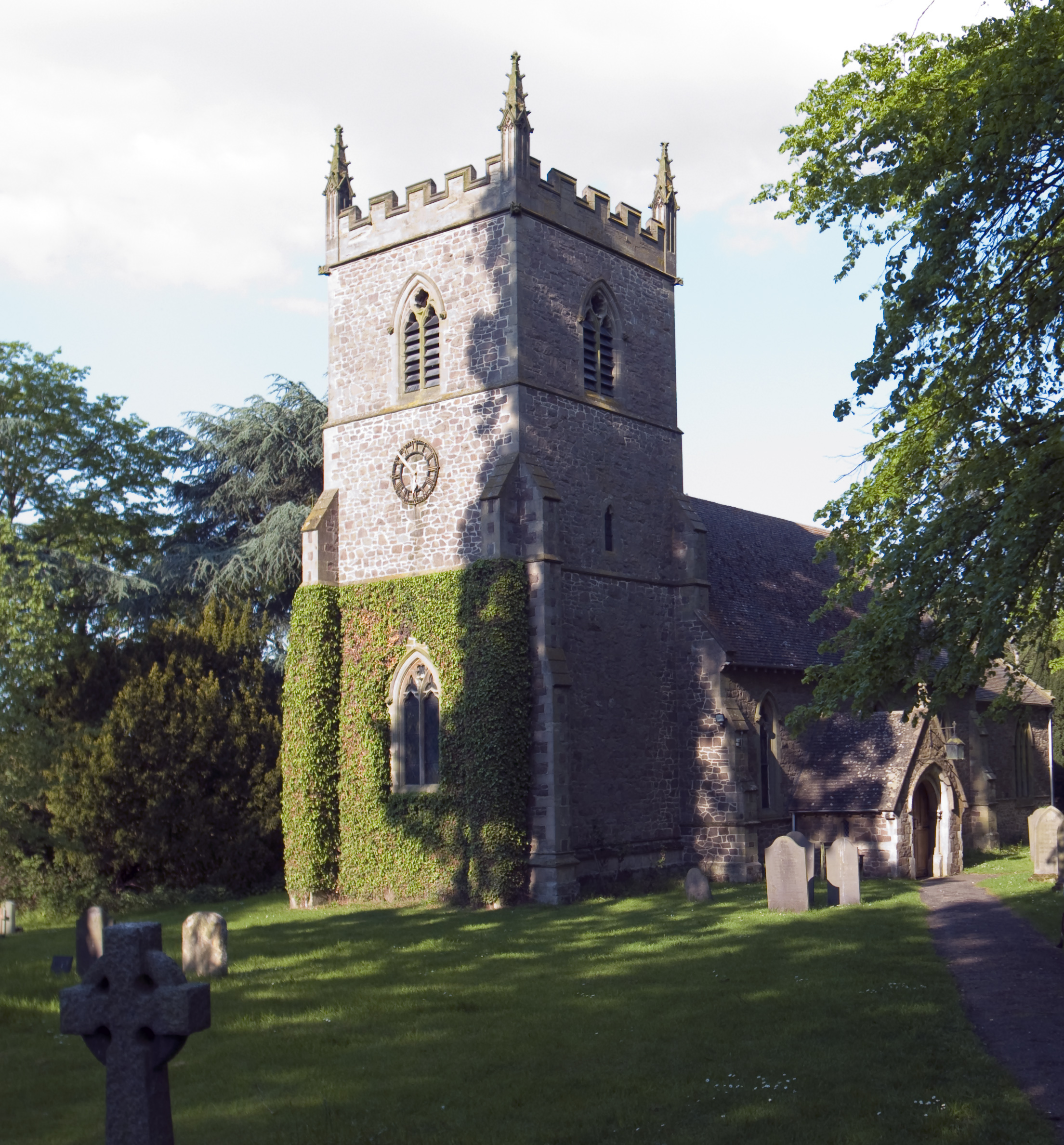
- St Peter's Church, Aston Flamville

- Location within Leicestershire
- Population: 311 (2011 Census)
- District: Blaby
- Shire county: Leicestershire
- Region: East Midlands
- Country: England
- Sovereign state: United Kingdom
- Post town: HINCKLEY
- Postcode district: LE10
- Dialling code: 01455
- Police: Leicestershire
- Fire: Leicestershire
- Ambulance: East Midlands
- UK Parliament: South Leicestershire

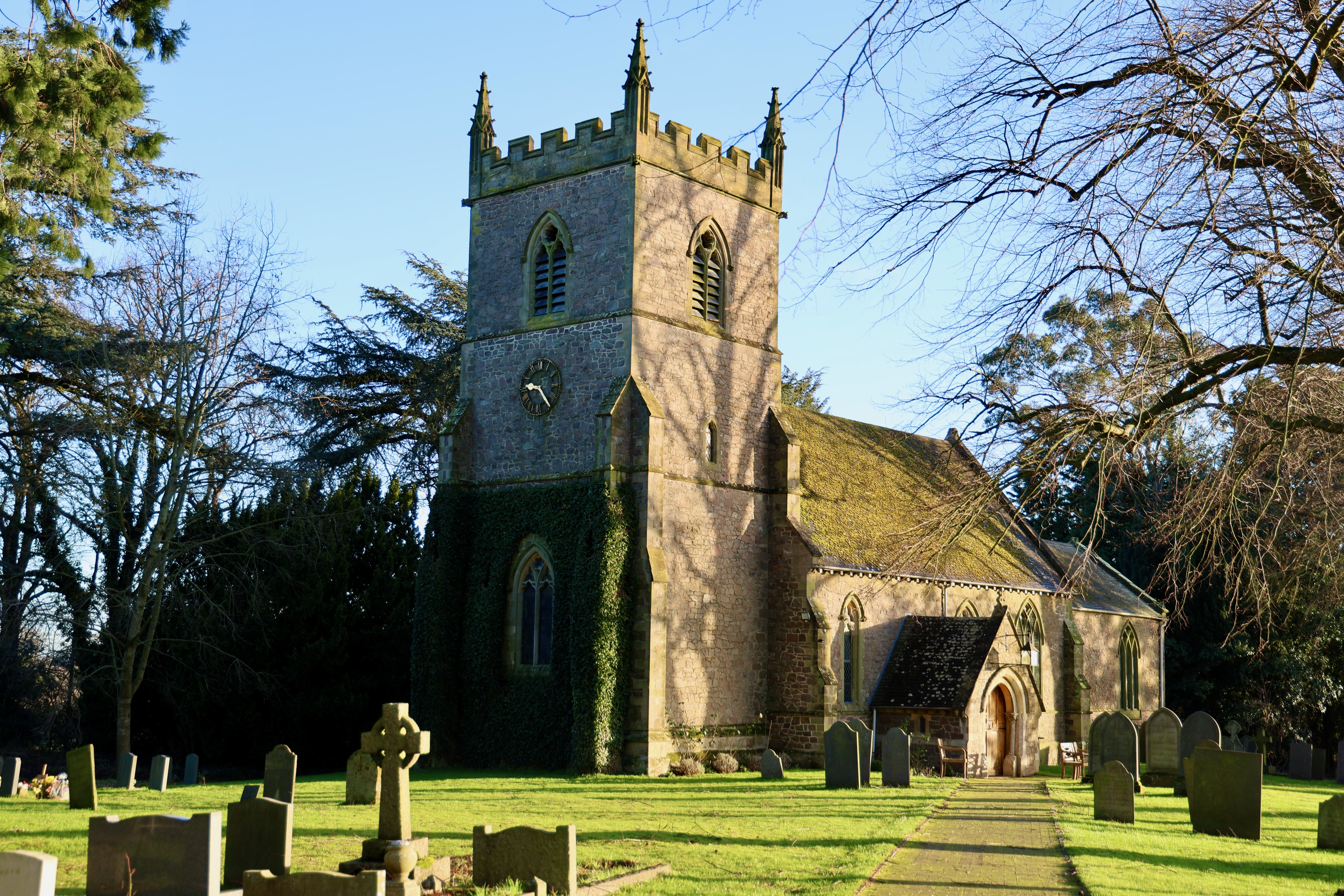
St Peter's

Aston Flamville is a village and civil parish in the Blaby district in Leicestershire, England. It is situated near Hinckley, but on the other (eastern) side of the M69. It has a population of 150 and consequently has a parish meeting rather than a parish council. The population at the 2011 census had increased to 311.

== History ==
=== Toponymy ===
The village's name means 'east farm/settlement'. In 1247 the village was held by Robert de Flamvile.

=== Turville family ===
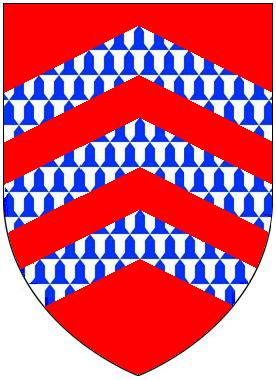
Arms of Turville of Aston Flamville: Gules, three chevronels vair. As depicted on the mural monument of Richard Berrie Esq. (d.1645), lord of manor of Berrynarbor, Devon, in Berrynarbor Church. His second wife was Dorothy Turville, daughter of George Turville of Aston Flamville

Dame Mary Roskell wrote of the Turville family as follows:

"The noble and ancient family of Turville, formerly de Tourville, was planted in this country by one of the companions of William the Norman, and for some generations flourished at Normanton Turville in Leicestershire, when, having married the heiress of the Flamvilles of Aston Flamville (who from their arms the maunch would appear to have been a branch of the family of Hastings, the pristine lords of Aston Flamville), they settled at that place and resided there, until the marriage of the representative of the family with the heiress of the Fortescues of Bosworth Hall, county Leicester, and Idbury, county Oxford, etc., brought those estates into the family. If we respect a family, as we ought to do, for preserving an ancient patrimony and position by piety, prudence and self-denial, still more must we venerate such a family as this, which not only exhibits the above virtues but possesses the far higher one of having preserved inviolate the ancient faith through centuries of persecution and injustice, and thus stands as a living witness against modern

assumptions".

=== Civil War ===
The records of the Warwickshire county committee reveal that Aston Flamville was occasionally visited by troops from the parliamentary garrisons in north Warwickshire. Among a list of claims for losses and "free quarter" submitted to the county committee in June, 1646 George Turville, of Aston Flamville, described as a gentleman, claimed for twelve strikes of oats and three strikes of peas worth 16s 6d taken by Coventry forces. William Turville, another gentleman, claimed that troops under Colonel Barker from the Coventry garrison took two horses with bridles and saddles worth £13. Mr Hill claimed on another occasion that troops from the Astley, Warwickshire garrison took a horse and "divers other things" worth £12.
