= Wolstan Dixie (born 1576) =

English landowner and MP (1576-1650)

Sir Wolstan Dixie of Appleby Magna and then Market Bosworth (1576 – 25 July 1650) was an English landowner and MP, who was responsible for the refounding of the Dixie Grammar School in Market Bosworth.

He was born the son of John Dixie, a yeoman farmer of Catworth, Huntingdonshire. He was admitted to Gray's Inn in October 1595. In 1594 he inherited an estate at Market Bosworth from his great-uncle the first Sir Wolstan Dixie, Lord Mayor of London. In 1601 he refounded the medieval grammar school at Market Bosworth, in accordance with his great-uncle's will.

He was knighted by James I of England in 1604 as Sir Wolstan Dixie of Appleby Magna, his newly acquired manor. In 1608 he moved to Market Bosworth and commenced work on the original manor house and a grammar school. In 1630 he was listed as the only freeholder in Market Bosworth.

He became a Justice of the Peace in Leicestershire in 1604 and was active in the administration of the county. In 1614 he was appointed High Sheriff of Leicestershire and in 1625 the county's representative in Parliament.

Although he was too old to actively participate in the English Civil War, he supported the king financially and was rewarded with the promise of a baronetcy, which his son received at the Restoration. He died in 1650.

He married Frances, the daughter of Sir Thomas Beaumont of Stoughton Grange, Leicestershire in 1598. In 1619 he had 4 sons and 4 daughters living.

- Wolstan (1602-1682)
- Frances married Walter Rolte of Clifton, Bedfordshire.
- Elizabeth married Sir Verney Noel of Wellesborough in Sheepy, Leicestershire
- Mary married John Pelsant, rector of Bosworth
- Jane married John Adderley of Weddington, Warwickshire.
