= Tim de Lisle =

British writer and editor

Timothy John March Phillipps de Lisle (born 25 June 1962) is a British writer and editor who is a former feature writer for The Guardian and other publications, focusing on cricket and rock music.

== Early life and education ==
De Lisle is the second son of stockbroker Major Everard John Robert March Phillipps de Lisle (1930–2003), of the Royal Horse Guards, Adjutant of the Household Cavalry Regiment from 1955 to 1958, High Sheriff of Leicestershire in 1974, and Vice-Lord Lieutenant of Leicestershire from 1990 to 2003, and his wife Hon. Mary Rose, daughter of Conservative politician Osbert Peake, 1st Viscount Ingleby, His paternal grandfather was the cricketer, soldier and High Sheriff of Leicestershire John de Lisle, of Stockerston Hall, Rutland, who was of a prominent family of Leicestershire landed gentry that owned Grace Dieu Manor and Quenby Hall. His paternal grandmother was Muriel de Lisle, a pioneering Girl Guide executive. de Lisle was educated at Eton and Worcester College, Oxford.

== Career ==
De Lisle was originally a writer for Smash Hits and then subsequently a feature writer for The Guardian, focusing on cricket and rock music. He edited the magazine Intelligent Life from 2008 to 2015, is the pop critic at The Mail on Sunday and also edited the Wisden Cricketers' Almanack in 2003.

== Personal life ==
De Lisle married in 1991, and has two children.
