= John Storey =

John Storey or Story may refer to:

- John Story (martyr) (1504–1571), or Storey, English Roman Catholic martyr and member of parliament
- John Storey (politician) (1869–1921), Australian politician, premier of New South Wales
- John Storey (rower) (born 1987), New Zealand Olympic rower
- John D. Storey, American scientist
- John Douglas Story (1869–1966), Australian civil servant, public service commissioner of Queensland
- John Story (businessman), Australian businessman, grandson of John Douglas Story
- John Story (cricketer) (1812–1872), English cricketer and British Army officer
- John Patten Story (1841–1915), United States Army general

== See also ==
- Jack Storey (disambiguation)
