= Stockerston =

Village in Leicestershire, England

Coordinates: 52°34′10″N 0°45′55″W

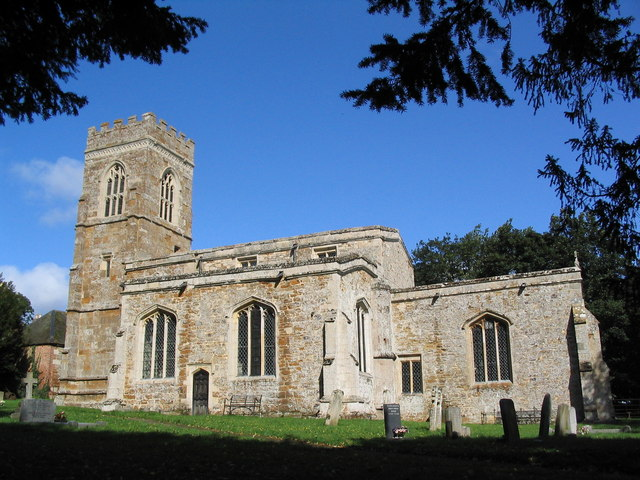
Church of St Peter, Stockerston

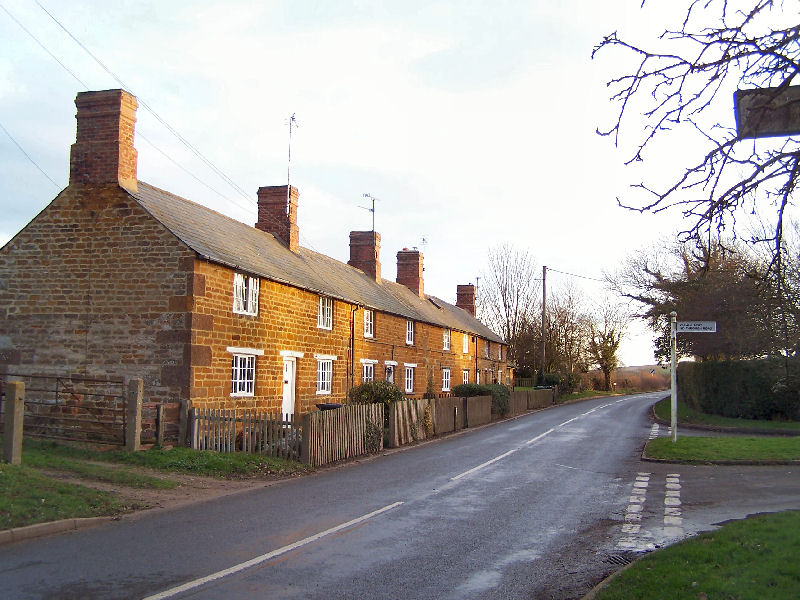
Stockerston

Stockerston is a village and civil parish in the Harborough district of Leicestershire, England, located on the border with Rutland, by the Eye Brook. According to the 2001 census the parish had a population of 35. The population remained less than 100 at the 2011 census and is included in the civil parish of Horninghold.

== Topography ==
The Parish contains various woods including the large Bolt Wood and Park Wood, and the smaller Fishpond Spinney, Great Spinney, Little Merrible Wood, and Holyoaks Wood. Bolt Wood and Park Wood are fragments of the medieval Leighfield Forest and included in the sites of special scientific interest known as the Eye Brook Valley Woods.

== History ==
Analysis of the name of the village name suggests it derives from the term 'made of wood'. Archaeologists state that the scatterings of Roman and Anglo-Saxon pottery discovered at Stockerston indicate occupation during that era. The village was in the Gartree Hundred and had two mentions in the Domesday Book. Stockerston is recorded as having two medieval hospitals. The first was established in 1307 and dedicated to St Leonard. The second was founded by John Boyville in 1465 and dedicated to St Mary and All Saints. In 1666, due to the Great Fire of London, Anthony Tuckney (1599–1670), a notable English Puritan theologian, and University of Cambridge scholar, temporarily resided in the village. In 1840, there was a significant tithe commutation.

From 1580 to 1807, the manor was held by the Burton family, whose memorials can be found in the parish church.

There are ten listed buildings in the village:

- Stockerston Hall
- A pair of gate pillars at Harborough Hill Road
- Stone Cottage
- 28, Stockerston Road
- The Spital
- The Loophole, 46 Stockerston Road
- Manor Farmhouse
- The Lodge
- The Church of Saint Peter
- Manor Cottages, comprising The Cottage, Manor Cottage, Pedlar's Rest and Apple Cottage

The two principal buildings in the village are the parish church (St Peter's) and Stockerston Hall.

== St Peter's church ==
This Grade I Listed Building is situated on the north side of Church Lane, close to Stockerston Hall. The present structure was largely built in the 13th to 15th centuries. The windows contain some medieval stained glass and the memorials inside the church include a brass that commemorates John Boyville (died c.1467) and his wife. The inscription is recorded as orate pro animabus Johannis Boivile Armig. & Eliz. uxoris ejus, qui hoc campanile cum campanis fieri fecerunt, 1467 (i.e. "pray for the souls of John Boivile, a bearer of arms, and Elizabeth his wife who had this bell tower and bells made").
