= Anne Reynolds =

English courtier (died 1634)

Anne Reynolds (died 1634) was an English courtier.

She was a daughter of Robert Reynolds (d. 1635), a gentleman of London.

In 1600 she married Thomas Havers, a merchant tailor and collector of customs known as a customer. She became a friend of Anne of Denmark, wife of James VI and I.

She had several children with Havers, naming her daughters Mary and Sophia (d. 1621) after the queen's daughters.

In 1605 Elizabeth Kitson told Philip Gawdy that his nephew Framlingham Gawdy had formed an unsuitable connection with a "Mistress Havers". It is not clear if this was the same person. Gawdy had connections to Anne of Denmark's household, acknowledging Mary Gargrave and Elizabeth Southwell as cousins.

Her second son Charles Havers (b. 1606) married Mary Baker (b. 1608), a daughter of one of the royal surgeons Alexander Baker, in November 1626. Alexander Baker (d. 1635) is best known for his role in the Lancashire witch trials of 1634, selecting midwives to be trained by William Harvey to examine the accused women for witch marks. Charles Havers quarreled with his father-in-law, who left Mary Havers his little portative organ in his will and cancelled litigation against Havers provided he did not abuse his wife.

Havers died in August 1616 during an epidemic described as a "new ague or sickness". John Chamberlain wrote that Havers had died, "a customer, better known than esteemed for his wife, a fine minx that is the Queen's woman".

She married Sir Thomas Burton of Stockerston Hall (1580–1655) on 28 August 1617 at St James, Clerkenwell. She was the mother of Sir Thomas Burton, 2nd Baronet (1622–1659) and other children.

She died in 1634.
