= Henry Poole (died 1559) =

English politician

Henry Poole (died 1559) was an English politician.

He was the eldest son of Henry Poole of Kirk Langley and Chesterfield, Derbyshire and Ursula Twyford.

He was a Knight of St John and served on Malta through much of the 1530s.

On the dissolution of the order by Henry VIII, he served as a justice of the peace for Leicestershire from 1538 until his death. He was commissioner for musters in 1539 and 1546 and commissioner for relief in 1550. He was elected a member (MP) of the Parliament of England for Leicestershire in April 1554. He was appointed High Sheriff of Warwickshire and Leicestershire for 1558-59 but died during the latter year. His term of office was completed by his brother-in-law Brian Cave. He was buried at Kirk Langley, where he was born: the church contains a memorial to himself and his wife.

He married Dorothy, the daughter of Richard Cave of Stanford, Northamptonshire, and the widow of John Smith of Withcote, Leicestershire. Withcote Hall "one of the fairest houses in Leicestershire" became the principal family residence. They had one son, also Henry. He also had two illegitimate children, including Elizabeth, who married John Bussey of Heydour, Lincolnshire and had a numerous family, including Edmund and Jane.

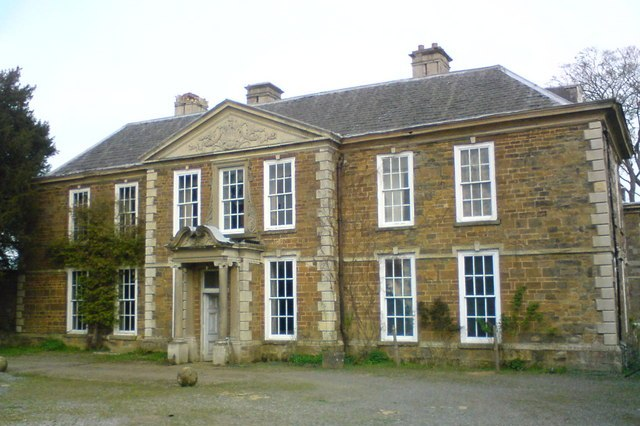
Withcote Hall, Henry Poole's principal residence after his marriage, present day
