= High Sheriff of Leicestershire =

List of officials of an English county

This is a list of Sheriffs and High Sheriffs of Leicestershire, United Kingdom. The Sheriff is the oldest secular office under the Crown. Formerly the High Sheriff was the principal law enforcement officer in the county but over the centuries most of the responsibilities associated with the post have been transferred elsewhere or are now defunct, so that its functions are now largely ceremonial. Under the provisions of the Local Government Act 1972, on 1 April 1974 the office previously known as Sheriff was retitled High Sheriff. The High Sheriff changes every March.

Forum 1158 to 1566 the Sheriffdom of Leicestershire was united with that of Warwickshire. After some years as part of Leicestershire, Rutland was split away in 1996 as a Unitary Authority with its own shrievalty. Thus there is a separate High Sheriff of Rutland (an office that existed prior to 1974 as the Sheriff of Rutland).

== Sheriffs of Leicestershire ==
=== 11th century ===
- c.1066: Hugh de Grandmesnil
- 1098: Ivo de Grandmesnil

=== 12th century ===
- 1158 – 1566 The role of Sheriff of Leicester was united with that of the Sheriff of Warwickshire
- 1158: Bertram de Bulmer and Ralph Basset
- 1159: Ralph Basset
- 1160: William Basset
- 1161: Robert fitz Geoffrey and William Basset
- 1162: William Basset
- 1163: Ranulf de Glanvill and William Basset
- 1164–1168: William Basset of Sapcote
- 1169–1178: Bertram de Verdon
- 1179: Ranulf de Glanvill and Bertram de Verdon
- 1180–1186: Ranulf de Glanvill
- 1187–1189: Michael Belet
- 1190: Hugh Nonant, Bishop of Coventry
- 1191: Hugh Bardulf and Hugh Clarke
- 1192: Hugh Nonant, Gilbert de Segrave of Segrave and Reginald Basset (jointly)
- 1193: Reginald Basset
- 1194: Reginald Basset and Gilbert de Segrave
- 1195: Reginald Basset, Gilbert de Segrave and William d'Aubigni
- 1196: Reginald Basset
- 1197: Reginald Basset, Gilbert de Segrave and William d'Aubigni
- 1198: Robert Harecourt
- 1199: Reginald Basset
- 1200: Robert Harecourt

=== 13th century ===
- 1201: Robert Harecourt and Godfrey de Liege
- 1202: William de Cantelupe and Robert Poyer
- 1203: Robert Poyer
- 1204–1207: Hugh Chaucomber
- 1208–1209: Robert Roppest
- 1210: William de Cantelupo and Robert Poyer
- 1212–1215: Robert of Ropsley
- 1217: William de Cantelupo and Philip Kniton
- 1218–1219: Philip Kniton
- 1220: William de Cantelupo and William de Luditon
- 1221–1222: William de Luditon
- 1223: John Russell and John Winterborne
- 1224–1226: Robert Lupus
- 1227: William Stutevill and William Ascellis
- 1228: William Ascellis
- 1229: Stephen de Segrave and William Edmonds
- 1230–1231: William Edmonds
- 1232: Stephen de Segrave and John de Riparis
- 1233: Ralph Bray
- 1234: Ralph fitz Nicholas and Ralph Brewedon
- 1235: Ralph and William Erleg.
- 1236–1237: William de Lucy
- 1238: Hugh Pollier and Philip Ascett
- 1239–1246: Hugh Pollier
- 1247–1248: Baldwin Paunton
- 1249–1251: Philip Marmion
- 1252–1255: William Maunsel
- 1256: Alan Swinford
- 1257–1258: Anketil Mativaus
- 1259–1270: William Bagot
- 1271: William Bagot and William Morteyn
- 1272–1274: William Mortimer
- 1275–1277: William Hamelin
- 1278: Robert de Verdon and Thomas de Hasele
- 1279–1283: Robert de Verdon and Osbert Bereford
- 1284–1285: Robert de Verdon and Osbert Bereford and Thomas Farendon
- 1286: Thomas Farendon and Fulk de Lacy
- 1287: Fulk de Lucy
- 1288–1289: William Bonvill
- 1290–1291: Stephen Baber
- 1292: Stephen Baber and William de Castello
- 1293–1297: William de Castello
- 1298–1299: John Broughton

=== 14th century ===
- 1300–1301: Philip de Gayton
- 1302–1304: John le Dene and Richard Herehus
- 1305–1306: Richard Whitnere
- 1307: John le Dene and Geoffrey Segrave
- 1308–1309: Richard Herthull
- 1310–1311: John le Dene
- 1312–1313: John Olney
- 1314–1315: William Trussell
- 1316: Walter de Beauchamp
- 1317: Walter de Beauchamp and William Newill
- 1318: Ralph Beler of Kettleby
- 1319: William Nevill
- 1320–1321: Thomas le Rous
- 1322:
- 1323–1325: Henry Nottingham, Robert Morin and Oliver Waleys
- 1327: Roger Aylesbury
- 1328: Thomas Blancfront
- 1329: Robert Burdet
- 1330: Robert Burdet and Roger la Zouch
- 1331–1332: Roger Aylesbury
- 1333: Henry Hockley and Roger la Zouch
- 1334–1340: Roger la Zouch
- 1341: William Pieto
- 1342: Robert Bereford
- 1343–1344: John Waleys (son of Oliver, HS 1323)
- 1345–1369: Thomas de Beauchamp, 11th Earl of Warwick
- 1370: John Peach
- 1371: William Catesby
- 1372: Robert Harthull
- 1373: Roger Hillary
- 1374: John Boyvill
- 1375: John Burdet of Huncote, Leics
- 1376: William Breton
- 1377: Richard Harthull
- 1377: Roger Perewych
- 1378: John de Bermingham
- 1379: Sir William Flamville of Aston Flamville, Leics
- 1380: Thomas Ralegh
- 1381: Thomas de Bermingham
- 1382–1383: William Bagot of Bagington, Warks
- 1384: John de Bermingham
- 1385: Sir John Calveleigh of Stapleford, Leics. and Teigh
- 1386: John Parker
- 1387: Richard Ashby
- 1388: Sir William Flamville of Aston Flamville, Leics
- 1389: Adomar de Lichfield
- 1390: Sir Robert de Harington of Glooston, Leics
- 1391: John Malloery of Swinford
- 1392: Thomas de Woodford of Sproxton
- 1393: Thomas Oudeby of Stoke Dry, Rutland and Hathern, Leics
- 1394: Robert Veer of Thrapston, Leics
- 1395: Sir Henry Neville of Prestwold, Leics
- 1396: Robert Goushul
- 1397: John Eynesford
- 1398: Adomar de Lichfield
- 1399: Sir John Berkeley, Kt of Coston and Wymondham, Leics
- 1400: Sir Henry Neville, Kt of Prestwold, leics

=== 15th century ===
- 1400: Sir Henry Neville, Kt of Prestwold, Leics
- 1402: Sir Alfred Trussell, Kt of Nuthurst, Warks
- 1403: John Blaket
- 1404: Sir William Brokesby
- 1405: Sir John Berkeley, Kt
- 1406: Sir Thomas Lucy, Kt of Charlecote Park, Warks.
- 1407: John Parr
- 1408: Sir Henry Neville, Kt of Prestwold, Leics
- 1409: Sir William Brokesby of Shoby, Leics.
- 1410: Robert Castell of Withinbroke, Warks.
- 1411: Bartholemew Brokesby
- 1413: Thomas Crewe of Moor Hall in Wixford, Warws.
- 1414: Sir Richard Hastings, Kt
- 1415: Sir Thomas Burdet, Kt of Arrow
- 1416: John Mallory of Newbold Revel, Warks.
- 1417: William Bishopton
- 1418: John Salveyn
- 1419: Bartholemew Brokesby
- 1420–1421: Thomas Erdington of Erdington, Warks. and Thomas Maureward
- 1422: Sir Richard Hastings, Kt
- 1423: Humphrey Stafford
- 1424: John Mallory of Newbold Revel, Warks.
- 1425: Richard Cloddale
- 1426: Sir Richard Hastings, Kt
- 1427: Thomas Stanley
- 1428: William Peyto of Chesterton, Warks.
- 1429: Nicholas Rugeley of Dunton, Warwickshire
- 1430: Humphrey Stafford
- 1431: Sir William Mountfort, Kt of Coleshill-in-Arden, Warks
- 1432: Sir Richard Hastings, Kt
- 1433: Thomas Foulshurst
- 1434: Thomas Ardington
- 1435: William Lucy
- 1436: Sir William Peyto, Kt of Chesterton, Warks.
- 1437: Robert Ardern
- 1438: Sir Humphrey Stafford, Kt
- 1439: Sir Laurence Berkeley of Wymondham, Leics.
- 1440: Thomas Ashby of Lowesford
- 1441: Sir William Mountfort, Kt of Coleshill-in-Arden
- 1442: William Bermingham and Lawrence Sherrard of Stapleford, Leics.
- 1443: Lawrence Sherrard
- 1444: Robert Harcourt of Bosworth, Leics.
- 1445: Sir Thomas Erdington, Kt of Barrow, Leics
- 1446: Thomas Everingham
- 1447: Thomas Porter and William Purefoy
- 1448: William Purefoy
- 1449: William Lucy
- 1450: Sir William Mountfort, Kt of Coleshill-in-Arden
- 1451: Sir Robert Motun, Kt
- 1452: Sir William Bermingham, Kt
- 1453: Sir Edward or Leonard Hastings
- 1454: Thomas Berkeley of Wymondham
- 1455: William Hastings
- 1456: Thomas Walsh of Wanlip, Leics
- 1457: Thomas Maston
- 1458: Henry Filongley of Fillongley, Warks
- 1459: Sir Edmund Mountford, Kt
- 1460:
- 1461: Thomas Ferrers
- 1462–1463: John Grevill
- 1464: Sir William Harcourt, Kt
- 1465: John Huggford
- 1466: Thomas Thockmorton of Coughton Court, Warks.
- 1467: Ralph Woodford of Knipton, Leics.
- 1468: Sir Edward Raleigh, Kt
- 1469: Sir Thomas Ferrers, Kt
- 1470: Sir John Grevill, Kt
- 1471: Sir Simon Mountford, Kt
- 1472: William Motun
- 1473: John Huggford
- 1474: Sir John Grevill, Kt
- 1475: William Lucy
- 1476: Sir William Trussell, Kt
- 1477: John Branfitz
- 1478: Sir John Grevill, Kt
- 1479: Sir Thomas Pulteney of Misterton Hall, Leics
- 1480: Richard Boughton of Lauford, Warks.
- 1481: Thomas Colesey or Cocksey
- 1482: Sir Everard (or Edward) Fielding
- 1483: Thomas Entwysel
- 1483: Humphrey Beaufort of Guys Cliff, Warks.
- 1484: Richard Broughton and Robert Throgmorton
- 1485: John Digby
- 1486: Henry Lisle
- 1487: Robert Throgmorton
- 1488: Sir William Lucy, Kt
- 1489: Thomas Brereton
- 1490: Sir John Villiers Kt of Brokesby, Leics
- 1491: Robert Throgmorton
- 1492: Sir Thomas Pulteney, Kt of Misterton Hall, Leics
- 1493: Sir Ralph Shirley
- 1494: Sir John Villiers, Kt of Brooksby, Leics
- 1496: Sir Edward Raleigh, Kt
- 1496: William Brookesby
- 1497: Thomas Neville
- 1498: Sir Richard Pudsey, Kt
- 1499: Sir John Villiers, Kt of Brooksby, Leics
- 1500: Thomas Hasilrigg

=== 16th century ===
- 1501: Edward Belknap
- 1502: Nicholas Mallory
- 1503: Henry Lisle
- 1504: Nicholas Brome
- 1505: Sir Henry Willoughby
- 1506: Sir Edward Raleigh
- 1507: Thomas Trussel
- 1508: William Skeffington of Skeffington, Leics.
- 1509: Simon Digby
- 1510: Sir John Aston, Kt
- 1511: Sir Maurice Berkeley
- 1512: William Turpin
- 1513: Sir Edward Ferrers, Kt
- 1514: Sir John Digby, Kt
- 1515: Sir William Skeffington of Skeffington, Leics.
- 1516: Sir Maurice Berkeley
- 1517: Simon Digby
- 1518: Sir Edward Digby, Kt
- 1518: Sir Edward Ferrers, Kt
- 1519: Sir Henry Willoughby, Kt
- 1520: Everard Digby of Tilton, Leics. and Stoke Dry, Rutland
- 1521: Sir William Skeffington of Skeffington, Leics.
- 1522: William Browne
- 1523: Edward Conway
- 1524: Sir Thomas Lucy, Kt
- 1525: Sir Henry Willoughby, Kt
- 1526: Sir George Throckmorton, Kt
- 1527: Sir Thomas Poulteney, Kt
- 1528: Roger Ratcliffe
- 1529: Richard Verney
- 1530: Christopher Villiers of Burstal
- 1531: Sir John Villers of Brooksby Hall
- 1532: Sir John Harington of Exton, Rutland
- 1533: John Audley
- 1534: Reginald Digby
- 1535: William Broughton
- 1536: Walter Smith
- 1537: Sir John Villers of Brooksby Hall
- 1538: Thomas Nevill
- 1539: John Digby of Ab Kettleby, Leics.
- 1540: Richard Catesby of Lapworth, Warks
- 1541: Roger Wigston of Wolston, Warks
- 1542: Sir Fulke Greville
- 1543: Sir George Throgmorton, Kt
- 1544: Reginald Digby
- 1545: Sir Richard Catesby, Kt of Lapworth, Warks
- 1546: Francis Poulteney and William Leigh
- 1547: Sir Fulke Greville
- 1548: Sir Ambrose Cave of Kingsbury Hall, Kingsbury, Warwickshire
- 1549: Sir Richard Manners of Garendon Park, Leics.
- 1550: Sir Edward Hastings of Loughborough of Loughborough, Leics.
- 1550: Sir Edward Greville
- 1551: William Wigston of Wolston, Warks.
- 1552: Sir Thomas Neville
- 1553: Sir Robert Throckmorton of Coughton Court, Warwickshire
- 1554: Sir Thomas Hastings
- 1555: Sir Edward Greville
- 1556: Francis Shirley of Staunton Harold Hall and Ettington, Leics
- 1557: Sir William Wigston of Wolston, Warks.
- 1558: Henry Poole of Withcote, died and replaced by Brian Cave of Ingarsby, Leics.
- 1559: Thomas Lucy
- 1560: William Skeffington of Skeffington, Leics.
- 1561: Sir Thomas Neville, Kt
- 1562: Sir Richard Verney, Kt
- 1563: John Fisher
- 1564: Sir William Devereux of Merevale, Warks.
- 1565: Sir George Turpin, Kt of Knaptoft, Leics.
- 1566: Francis Smith of Ashby Folville, Leics.
- From 1567 the Sheriff of Leicestershire and Warwickshire became two separate roles once more
- 1567: George Sherard of Stapleford Park
- 1568: Henry Poole of Withcote
- 1569: Brian Cave of Ingarsby
- 1570: Sir James Harrington, Kt
- 1571: Sir George Hastings
- 1572: Sir Francis Hastings
- 1573: Edward Legh of Shawell
- 1574: Sir George Turpin, Kt of Knaptoft
- 1575: Roger Villiers
- 1576: Thomas Skeffington of Belgrave
- 1577: Nicholas Beaumont of Coleorton
- 1578: Thomas Ashby
- 1579: Thomas Cave of Baggrave
- 1580: Sir Francis Hastings
- 1581: George Purefoy
- 1582: Brian Cave of Ingarsby
- 1583: Andrew Noel of Dalby, Leics. and Brooke
- 1584: Henry Turville
- 1585: William Turpin of Knaptoft
- 1586: Andrew Faunt
- 1587: William Cave
- 1588: Thomas Skeffington of Belgrave
- 1589: Edward Turville
- 1590: George Purefoy
- 1591: Sir George Villiers of Brooksby.
- 1592: Thomas Cave of Baggrave
- 1593: William Turpin of Knaptoft
- 1594: Sir Henry Beaumont of Coleorton Hall
- 1595: William Cave
- 1596: Henry Cave
- 1597: William Skipwith of Cotes
- 1598: William Digby
- 1599: Thomas Skeffington of Belgrave

=== 17th century ===
- 1600: Roger Smith
- 1601: George Ashby of Quenby Hall
- 1602: Thomas Humphrey of Swepstone
- 1603: Sir William Faunt
- 1604: William Noel
- 1605: Sir Basil Brooke of Lubenham
- 1606: Sir Thomas Neville
- 1607: Sir Henry Hastings, Kt of Long Clawson
- 1608: Sir William Villiers, 1st Baronet of Brokesby
- 1609: John Plumbe
- 1610: Sir Thomas Beaumont Kt of Coleorton Hall
- 1611: Sir Brian Cave, Kt
- 1612: Sir Thomas Hesilrige of Noseley Hall
- 1613: Thomas Staveley
- 1614: Sir Wolstan Dixie of Bosworth Hall
- 1615: Sir William Faunt
- 1616: Sir William Halford, Kt
- 1617: Edward Hartopp later Sir Edward Hartopp, 1st Baronet of Freathby
- 1618: William Jervis and Sir William Roberts
- 1619: John Cave
- 1619: Sir Henry Hastings Kt of Leicester Abbey
- 1620: Sir Alexander Cave
- 1621: Richard Halford of Wistow
- 1622: George Bennet
- 1623: Sir John Bale, Kt of Carlton Curlieu Hall
- 1624: Sir Henry Shirley, bt
- 1625: Sir Thomas Hartopp of Burton Lazars
- 1626: Nathaniel Lacy
- 1627: George Ashby of Quenby Hall
- 1628: Sir Erasmus de la Fontaine
- 1629: William Woollaston of Shenton Hall
- 1630: John Bainbrigge of Lockington Hall
- 1631: Gregory Brokesby of Shoby
- 1632: John St John
- 1633: Sir Thomas Burton, 1st Baronet of Stockerston Hall
- 1634: Francis Saunders
- 1635: John Poulteney
- 1636: Sir Henry Skipwith, 2nd Baronet
- 1637: Sir Richard Roberts, Kt
- 1638: John Whatton
- 1639: William Halford
- 1640: John Pate
- 1641: Archdale Palmer
- 1642: Hon. Henry Hastings of Loughborough appointed by King, but Peter Palmer appointed by Parliament.
- 1643: Sir John Pate, 1st Baronet appointed by King, but Arthur Staveley appointed by Parliament.
- 1644: John Stafford
- 1645: William Hewitt of Dunton Bassett
- 1646: George Perkins
- 1647: George Pochin
- 1648: William Bainbridge
- 1649: Arthur Staveley
- 1650: William Noel
- 1651: Sir Thomas Cave, Kt
- 1652: Mark Hyland, discharged and replaced by Abel Burton, also discharged and replaced by William Quarles
- 1653: John Prettyman of Horninghold, later Sir John Pretyman, 1st Baronet
- 1654: Archdale Paulmer
- 1655: Henry Smith
- 1656: William Bradgate
- 1657: Richard Bennet
- 1658: George Faunt
- 1659:
- 1660: Richard Roberts
- 1660: John Gaunt
- 1661: Sir Wolstan Dixie, 1st Baronet
- 1662: Thomas Armeston.
- 1663: Sir Thomas Halford, 2nd Baronet
- 1664: Thomas Caldecote of Catthorpe
- 12 November 1665: Sir Edward Smith, 1st Baronet
- 7 November 1666: George Ashby
- 6 November 1667: Thomas Boothby, of Tooley Park
- 6 November 1668: Sir Thomas Beaumont, 1st Baronet
- 11 November 1669: Thomas Pochin
- 4 November 1670: Sir John Hartopp, 3rd Baronet, of Freeby
- 9 November 1671: Sir William Wale
- 11 November 1672: William Wollaston, of Shenton Hall
- 12 November 1673: Walter Rudings or Rudens
- 17 November 1673: William Franke, of Newarke, Leicester
- 5 November 1674: William Boothby, of Marston
- 15 November 1675: William Cole
- 10 November 1676: Walter Ruding
- 18 November 1676: Rowland Browne, of Listrop
- 26 November 1676: Thomas Wilson
- 15 November 1677: Thomas Babington
- 14 November 1678: Rowland Browne, of Borough
- 13 November 1679: St John Bennet
- 4 November 1680: Jeremiah Dove
- 10 November 1681: Richard Roberts
- 13 November 1682: John Wilson of Thorpe replaced 7 December 1682 by Sir Thomas Burton Bt of Stockerston Hall
- 12 November 1683 : Samuel Cotton of Dadlington
- 5 January 1684: John Wilson
- 26 November 1685: Thomas Wilson
- 25 November 1686: Sir Thomas Hesilrige, 4th Baronet of Noseley Hall
- 1688: William Palmer
- 1689: George Ashby
- 1690: William Whaley
- 1691: George Moreton
- 1692: Matthew Symonds
- 1693: John Bennet
- 1694: John Wilkins of Ravenstone
- 1695: George Pochin
- 1696: Richard Cheslyn
- 1697: Isaac Wollaston
- 1698: Nathaniel Gold replaced by Edward Conyers
- 1699: Thomas Bainbrigge

=== 18th century ===
- 1700: Thomas Skeffington
- 1701: George Hewitt
- 1702: Thomas Charnell
- 1703: James Armestone
- 1704: Sir Edward Wigley, Kt
- 1705: Sir Gilbert Pickering, 3rd Baronet of West Langton
- 1706: Charles Morris
- 1707: Clifton Packe
- 1708: Thomas Boothby
- 1709: William Hartopp
- 1710: George Burton
- 1711: Thomas Pochin of Barkby
- 1712: Henry Tate
- 1713: Thomas Gresley
- 1714: Francis Mundy
- 1715: Sir John Mears, Kt
- 1716: Sir Robert Hesilrige, 6th Baronet
- 1717: Sir Clobery Noel, 5th Baronet of Kirkby Mallory
- 1718: Thomas Smith (1682-1728) of Broxtowe, Nottinghamshire and of Gaddesby in Leicestershire
- 1719: John Bakewell, Snr, of Normanton
- 1720: William Hewitt
- 1721(Jun–Dec): Sir Joseph Danvers, 1st Baronet of Swithland
- 1722: Thomas Hartopp
- 1723: Francis Edwards
- 1724: Richard Smith, of Enderby,
- 1725: John Bletsoe of Rothley Temple, Rothley
- 1726: Edward Dawson
- 1727: Sir Wolstan Dixie, 4th Baronet
- 1728: George Moore of Appleby Parva
- 1729: John Symonds
- 1730: William Wells
- 1731: Thomas Marriot
- 1732: William Bainbridge
- 1733: Warin Ashby
- 1734: Edmund Craddock
- 1735: Robert Wilson
- 1736: Charles Bosville
- 1736: Leeke Okeover
- 1737: Timothy St Nicholas
- 1738: John Payne the Younger of Dunton Basset
- 1739: John Turner
- 1740: William Newland, of Queenborough
- 1741: Peter Wyche
- 1742: John Wright
- 1743: James Willson
- 1744: John Ayre
- 1745: Thomas Marriott
- 1746: Edmond Morris of Loddington
- 1747: Jonathan Grundy of Little Wixton
- 1748: James Winstanley
- 1749: Philip Bainbrig of Lockinton
- 1750: Thomas Babington of Rothley Temple, Rothley
- 1751: Samuel Phillipps
- 1752: Thomas Boothby
- 1753: William Herrick, of Beaumanor
- 1754: John Edwin, of Baggrave Hall
- 1755: Sir John Danvers, 2nd Baronet of Swithland
- 1756: William Pochin of Barkby
- 1757: Joshua Grundy, of New Hall Park
- 1758: Shuckburgh Ashby, of Blaby
- 1759: Edward Palmer
- 1760: Sir William Halford, 6th Baronet
- 1761: Sir George Beaumont, 6th Baronet of Coleorton Hall
- 1762: Calverley Bewicke
- 1763: Edward William Hartopp of Little Dalby Hall
- 1764: John Weston
- 1765: Ambrose Saunders
- 1766: Charles James Packe
- 1767: Joseph Cradock, of Gumbley
- 1768: Edward Dawson
- 1769: Sir Charles Halford, 7th Baronet
- 1770: Charles Haselrigge
- 1771: Lebbens Humfrey
- 1772: John Peach Hungerford
- 1773: William Shalcross Mason
- 1774: Clement Winstanley of Braunston
- 1775: John Simpson
- 1776: Robert Haymes
- 1777: Robert Abney of Measham
- 1778: William Hurst
- 1779: Charles Morris
- 1780: Sir Thomas Cave, 6th Baronet of Stanford Hall died and replaced by Thomas Babington of Rothley Temple, Rothley
- 1781: Edmund Cradock-Hartopp, later Sir Edmund Cradock-Hartopp, 1st Baronet of Freathby
- 1782: Sir John Palmer, 5th Baronet
- 1783: Charles Loraine Smith
- 1784: Sir Charles Grave Hudson, Bt
- 1785: William Vann of Belgrave
- 1786: William Herrick of Beaumanor
- 1787: John Goodacre of Ashby Parva
- 1788: John Clarke of Great Wigston
- 1789: Josias Cockshutt, of Osbaldiston
- 1790: Edward Wigley Hartopp
- 1791: Colonel John Frewen-Turner of Cold Overton Hall
- 1792: William Abney of Measham (by proxy) (father of Robert, HS 1777)
- 1792: Richard Spooner Jaques
- 1793: John Noon
- 1794: George Moore of Appleby Parva
- 1795: Edward Muxloe, died and replaced by Piers Anthony Keck of Slaughton
- 1796: James Richards
- 1797: Samuel Bracebridge Abney
- 1798: René Payne
- 1799: Henry Greene of Rolleston

=== 19th century ===
- 12 February 1800: Edward Manners, of Goadby Hall
- 11 February 1801: Thomas March Phillipps, of Garendon Hall
- 3 March 1802: John Pares, of the Newarke
- 3 February 1803: James Vann, of Belgrave Hall
- 23 April 1804: Henry Otway of Stanford Hall
- 1 May 1805: George Payne, of Sulby
- 1 February 1806: Frederick William Wollaston, of Shenton Hall
- 4 February 1807: William Burlton, of Wyken
- 18 February 1807: Edward Dawson, of Whatton House
- 3 February 1808: John Finch Simpson, of Launde Abbey
- 6 February 1809: Sir William Manners, of Buckminster
- 31 January 1810: Hon. Thomas Bowes, of Higham on the Hill
- 8 February 1811: Richard Norman, of Melton Mowbray
- 24 January 1812: Richard Cheslyn, of Langley Priory
- 10 February 1813: Robert Haymes, of Great Glen
- 4 February 1814: Jacob Henry Franks, of Misterton
- 13 February 1815: Edward Farnham, of Quorndon
- 1816: Charles William Pochin of Barkby Hall
- 1817: Clement Winstanley of Braunston
- 1818: Sir George Robinson, 6th Baronet of Stretton Hall
- 1819: Thomas Sansome of Hinkley
- 1820: John Clarke of Peatling Hall
- 1821: George Moore of Appleby Parva
- 1822: Charles James Packe
- 1823: Sir William Walker, Kt.
- 1824: Charles Godfrey Mundy
- 1825: Charles March-Phillipps of Grace Dieu Manor and Garendon Park
- 1826: Thomas Westley Oldham
- 1827: Otho Manners of Oadby Marwood
- 1828: George Pochin of Barkby Hall
- 1829: Joshua Grundy of the Oaks
- 1830: Sir George Beaumont, 8th Baronet, of Coleorton House
- 1831: George John Danvers Butler Danvers, of Swithland
- 1832: Edward Bourchier Hartopp, of Little Dalby Hall
- 1833: John Mansfield, of Birstall
- 1834: Edward Greene, of Rollestone
- 1835: William Herrick, of Beaumanor Hall
- 1836: Lionel Tollemache, Lord Huntingtower
- 1837: Sir Arthur Grey Hazlerigg, 12th Baronet, of Noseley Hall
- 1838: Sir Edmund Cradock-Hartopp, 2nd Baronet, of Knighton
- 1839: Edward Dawson, of Whatton House
- 1840: George Joseph Palmer, later Sir George Joseph Palmer, 3rd Baronet of Wanlip
- 1841: Richard Mitchell, of Enderby
- 1842: John Bainbrigge Story of Lockington Hall
- 1843: Sir Willoughby Dixie, 8th Baronet, of Bosworth Park, Market Bosworth
- 1844: Lord Archibald St Maur, of Burton on the Wolds
- 1845: William Corbet Smith, of Bitteswell
- 1846: William Ann Pochin, of Barkby Hall
- 1847: William Wootton Abney, of Swepstone
- 1848: Henry Freeman Coleman, of Evington Hall
- 1849: John Goodacre, of Lutterworth
- 1850: Thomas Stokes, of New Parks
- 1851: Sir Cornwallis Ricketts, 2nd Baronet, of Beaumont Leyes
- 1852: Sir George Beaumont, 9th Baronet, of Coleorton Hall
- 1853: Frederick Wollaston, of Shenton Hall
- 1854: Henry Corles Bingham, of Wartnaby
- 1855: William Ward Tailby, of Humberstone
- 1856: Thomas Cope, of Osbaston
- 1857: Edward Chatterton Middleton, of Loughborough
- 1858: Charles Thomas Freer, of Billesdon Coplow
- 1859: William Bosworth, of Charley
- 1860: Edward Henshaw Cheney, of Gaddesby
- 1861: Richard Sutton, later Sir Richard Sutton, 4th Baronet of Skeffington
- 1862: James Beaumont Winstanley, of Braunstone
- 1863: John Martin, of Whatton House
- 1864: Edwyn Burnaby, of Baggrave Hall
- 1865: Frederick Palmer, of Withcote Hall, Oakham
- 1866: Charles Frewen
- 1867: Edward Finch Dawson, of Launde Abbey
- 1868: Ambrose Lisle March Phillipps De Lisle, of Garendon Park
- 1869: Thomas Tertius Paget of Humberstone
- 1870: Edward Basil Farnham of Quorndon House
- 1871: Harry Leycester Powys Keck of Staughton Grange
- 1872: Sir Henry St John Halford Bt of Wistow Hall
- 1873: Isaac Harrison of Newfoundpool
- 1874: Edward Warner, of Quorndon Hall
- 1875: Thomas Charles Douglas Whitmore, of Gumley Hall
- 1876: Sir Alexander Beaumont Churchill Dixie, 11th Baronet of Boswoerth Hall, Market Bosworth
- 1877: Hussey Packe, of Prestwold Hall
- 1878: Charles Marriott, of Cotesbach
- 1879: George Thomas Mowbray, of Grangewood House, Overseal
- 1880: Joseph Trueman Mills, of Husbands Bosworth
- 1881: Thomas Swift Taylor, of Leicester Frith
- 1881: Sir Archdale Robert Palmer, 4th Baronet of Wanlip
- 1882: William Winterton, of Leicester replaced original candidate Sir Francis Fortescue Turville, of Husbands Bosworth
- 1883: Richard Worsley Worswick, of Normanton
- 1884: The Hon. Harry Tywhitt Wilson, of Keythorpe
- 1885: Cecil George Assheton Drummond, of Enderby Hall
- 1886: David Bromilow, of Bitteswell Hall
- 1887: William Edward John Basil Farnham, of Quorndon House, Quorndon
- 1888: John Bertie Norreys Entwistle, of Kilworth House, Rugby
- 1889: James Percival Cross, of Catthorpe Towers, Rugby
- 1890: William Byerley Paget, of Loughborough
- 1891: Alexander Lauderdale Duncan, of Knossington Grange, Oakham
- 1892: William Henry Ellis, of Anstey Grange, near Leicester
- 1893: Charles Edmund de Trafford, of Hothorpe Hall, Theddingworth
- 1894: Joseph Griggs of Mountfields, Loughborough
- 1895: Charles Tollemache Scott, of Market Bosworth
- 1896: Sam Tudor Ashton, of Burton Lazars, Melton Mowbray
- 1897: Edward Handley Warner, of Quorn Hall, near Loughborough
- 1898: William Pochin Warner, of Langton Hall, Market Harborough
- 1899: Charles James Phillips of Old Dalby Hall, Melton Mowbray

=== 20th century ===
- 1900: Richard Smith-Carington, of Ashby Folville Manor
- 1901: Samuel Francis Stone, of Kirby Frith, Leicester
- 1902: James Burns Hartopp, of Little Dalby Hall
- 1903: George Murray Smith, of Gumley Hall
- 1904: George William Pochin, of Barkby Hall
- 1905: Thomas William Everard, of Nanpantan Hall
- 1906: Everard March Phillips de Lisle of Grace Dieu Warren, Whitwick
- 1907: Richard Dalgliesh, of Asfordby Place
- 1908: Frederick Gretton, of Sudbury Hall
- 1909: Arthur Hazlerigg, 1st Baron Hazlerigg, of Noseley Hall
- 1910: Herbert Hanbury Smith-Carington, of Ashby Folville
- 1911: Sir Edward Hussey Packe, of Prestwold Hall
- 1912: Oswald Henry Philip Turville-Petre, of Bosworth Hall, Husbands Bosworth
- 1913: John Breedon Everard, of Knighton
- 1914: Lupton Topham Topham, of Lutterworth
- 1915: Henry Trueman Mills, of Langton Hall
- 1916: Alfred Corah, of Scraptoft Hall
- 1917: Hugh George Goodacre, of Ullesthorpe Court
- 1918: Thomas Fielding Johnson, Jun., of Goscote Hall
- 1920: Sir John Turner, of Donisthorpe,
- 1921: John Edward Faire, of Evington Hall
- 1922: Alfred Ernest Haley, of Leicester Grange, Hinckley
- 1922: Sir Arthur Wheeler, of Woodhouse Eaves, Baronet
- 1923: Alfred Turner, of Brocks Hill, Oadby
- 1924: Sir William Lindsay Everard of Ratcliffe Hall
- 1925: James Leslie Cross, of Catthorpe Towers
- 1926: Sir Maurice Levy, 1st Baronet of Great Glen House
- 1927: William Montagu Curzon-Herrick of Beaumanor Hall
- 1928: Robert Walter Kaye, of Great Glen Manor
- 1929: Sir Harold Stansmore Nutting, 2nd Baronet of Quenby Hall, Leicester
- 1930: Francis Herbert Carrington Smith-Carrington, of Ashby Folville Manor
- 1931: Ernest Clive Atkins, of Stretton House, Hinckley
- 1932: Edward Gibson Gillilan, of Great Bowden
- 1933: Sir John Harold Corah, of Queniborough Hall
- 1934: Sir Charles Frederick Oliver, of Leicester
- 1935: William Albert North, of Keythorpe Hall
- 1936: John Ellis Viccars of Ingarsby Old Hall
- 1937: Sir Ewart Joseph Maurice Levy, of Great Glen House, Baronet
- 1938: Claud Bennion, of Billesdon Coplow
- 1939: Disney Barlow, of Woodhouse Eaves
- 1940: George Cecil Gorham Gee, of Rothley
- 1941: Victor Robert Pochin, of Barkby
- 1942: Harry Percy Gee, of Leicester
- 1943: Bernard Everard, of Bardon Hill
- 1944: Horace Wilmer Pochin, of Houghton on the Hill
- 1945: Samuel Frederick Peshall, of Quorn
- 1946: George German of Ashby de la Zouch (died in office 10 July 1946)
- Aug 1946: Leslie Crauford Robertson, of Sludge Hall, Billesdon
- 1947: Thomas Guy Frederick Paget, of Ibstock
- 1948: John Cecil Gerard Leigh of Thorpe Satchville Hall, Melton Mowbray.
- 1949: Charles Hamilton Martin of Kinchley House, Rothley
- 1950: Arthur Frederick John Roberts-George, of The Manor House, Thurnby
- 1951: Col. John Derrick Hignett, of Langton Grange, Market Harborough
- 1952: Arthur Stewart Gemmell, of Ingarsby Old Hall, Leicester
- 1953: Hubert Blount of Old Dalby Hall, Melton Mowbray (vacated position circa October 1953)
- Oct 1953: Robert Adolphus George Tilney of Sutton Bonington, Loughborough
- 1954: John Adrian Frederick March Phillipps de Lisle of Stockerston Hall
- 1955: Alexander William Edward Kirkpatrick, of Lowesby Hall, Leicester
- 1956: George Anthony Murray-Smith, of Gumley, Market Harborough
- 1957: Philip Henry Lloyd of Stone House, Blaston, Market Harborough
- 1958: David Constable Maxwell, of Bosworth Hall, Husbands Bosworth, Rugby
- 1959: Robert William Banner Newton, of Carlton Curlieu Hall, Leicester
- 1960: Willoughby Rollo Norman, of Pickwell Manor, Melton Mowbray
- 1961: Denis Joseph Cowen of East Farndon Hall, Market Harborough
- 1962: Sir Tresham Joseph Philip Lever, of Bosworth Old Hall, Husbands Bosworth, Rugby, Baronet
- 1963: Stephen Gordon Holland, of Foxton Grange, Market Harborough
- 1964: Patrick Anthony William Beresford Everard, of Ratcliffe Hall, Ratcliffe on the Wreake, Leicester
- 1965: Paul Cater Hyde-Thomson, of Catthorpe Manor, Rugby
- 1966: Hampton Ashburner Hughes of Chestnuts Farm, Hallaton, Market Harborough
- 1967: Lionel Berry, 2nd Viscount Kemsley, of Thorpe Lubenham Hall, Market Harborough
- 1968: Richard Peter Michael Spencer, of Rotherby Grange, Melton Mowbray
- 1969: Edmund Crispian Steven James George Brudenell, of Deene Park, Corby, Northants.
- 1970: John Michael Hignett, of Clipston Court, Market Harborough
- 1971: Archibald Somerset Clowes, of Ashlands, Billesdon, Leicester
- 1972: David Babington Smith, of Somerby Grove House, Old Somerby, Grantham, Lincolnshire
- 1973: Lord John Manners, of Reservoir Cottage, Knipton, Grantham, Lincolnshire

== High Sheriffs of Leicestershire ==
=== 20th century ===
- 1974: Everard John Robert March Phillips de Lisle of Stockerston Hall
- 1975: John Wedgwood Thellusson Wood of Home Farm, Bringhurst, Market Harborough
- 1976: George Hamilton Boyle, of Bisbrooke Hall, Uppingham, Rutland
- 1977: Simon Jasper Packe-Drury-Lowe, of Prestwold Hall, Loughborough
- 1978: Lyonel Humphry John Tollemache of Buckminster Park, near Grantham
- 1979: Timothy Gerald Martin Brooks of Wistow Hall, Leicester
- 1980: Ronald Edward Coaker of Seaton Old Rectory, Uppingham
- 1981: Kenwynn John Madocks Madocks Wright, of Saxelbye Park, Melton Mowbray.
- 1982: John Hanbury Smith-Carington of The Lodge, Ashby Folville
- 1983: Simon Everard of Sludge Hall, Cold Newton, Billesdon
- 1984: Anthony Walter Fenwick, of Eaton Grange, Grantham, Lincolnshire.
- 1985: David Gerald Brooks, 5th Baron Crawshaw, of Little Riste Farm, Long Whatton, near Loughborough
- 1986: Edward George Adrian Farnham, of Quorn House, Quorn
- 1987: Julian Peter Alexander March Phillips de Lisle, of the Old Rectory, Medbourne
- 1988: Alistair Thomas Charles Haywood of Lyndon, Oakham, Rutland
- 1989: Gerard Amoury Arnaud March Phillips de Lisle, of Quenby Hall
- 1990: Richard Douglas Fowler Bream of Manor Farm, Grace Dieu, Whitwick
- 1991: Robert Turville Constable-Maxwell, of Bosworth Hall, Husbands Bosworth, near Lutterworth.
- 1992: John Michael Moubray, of Ridlington House, near Oakham, Rutland.
- 1993: Robin Hylton Murray-Philipson of Blaston
- 1994: John Michael Stannage Whitehead, CBE, of Houghton-on-the-Hill
- 1995: Joseph Cowen of Laughton Manor Farm, Laughton Hills, Lutterworth
- 1996: George Nicholas Corah of Wakerley Old Rectory, near Oakham
- 1997: David Chetwode Samworth, CBE, of Thorpe Satchville
- 1998: Ian Malcolm McAlpine, OBE, of Peatling Hall, Peatling Parva
- 1999: Allison Grahame Wilson of Gaulby

=== 21st century ===
- 2000: Anthony Wessel
- 2001: Michael Charles Caines Sandell, Sutton Bassett, Market Harborough.
- 2002: Richard Anthony Spencer Everard, East Farndon Hall, Market Harborough
- 2003: Julien Birchall
- 2004: Freda Hussain
- 2005: James Geoffrey Pease Buxton
- 2006: Mark Robert Newton
- 2007: Barry Wilson Jackson
- 2008: David John Wyrko
- 2009: Maurice Nicholas Beech Thompson
- 2010: Robert Cecil John Martin
- 2011: Resham Singh Sandhu
- 2012: Richard Allan Halford Brooks
- 2013: Sally Elizabeth Ann Bowie
- 2014: Richard Charles Griffin Clowes
- 2015: Gordon Drake Arthur
- 2016: Surinder Sharma
- 2017: Timothy Paul Maxted of Leicester
- 2018: Diana Thompson
- 2019: Timothy Rowland Hercock of Halstead
- 2020: Alison Victoria Smith
- 2021: Ian Thomas Mattioli
- 2022: Mehmooda Duke
- 2023: Henrietta Joscelyne Chubb
- 2024: John Henry Chatfeild-Roberts, Melton Mowbray
- 2025: Stephen John Patrick Bryan, Normanton-le-Heath
- 2026: Meldin Thomas, Swadlincote
