= Richard Manners =

16th-century English politician

Sir Richard Manners (by 1510 – 9 February 1551) of Garendon Park, Leicestershire, was an English politician.

He was born before 1510, a younger son of George Manners, 11th Lord Ros and Anne, the daughter and heiress of Sir Thomas St. Leger of Guildford, Surrey and brought up in the household of his great-uncle Sir Thomas Lovell.

He entered court on Lovell's death in 1524. He was an esquire of the body by 1539–1544 or later, a cupbearer in the household of Anne of Cleves in 1540 and a member of the Council of the North in 1542. He was also elected a Member (MP) of the Parliament of England for Leicestershire in 1542. He held a number of commissions and served as deputy-warden of the east and middle Scottish Marches in 1548.

In 1539 he married, Margaret, the daughter of Sir Robert Dymoke of Scrivelsby, Lincolnshire and widow of Richard Vernon of Haddon, Derbyshire and of (Sir) William Coffin of Portledge, Devon and Bakewell, Derbyshire which brought him the estate at Garendon Park, near Loughborough. He was knighted the same year and was appointed High Sheriff of Warwickshire and Leicestershire for 1549–50.

He died childless in London in 1551 and was succeeded by his nephew, Henry Manners, 2nd Earl of Rutland.
