= Leighfield Forest SSSI =

Protected woods in Leicestershire, England

Coordinates: 52.611°N 0.858°W

Leighfield Forest
- Site of Special Scientific Interest
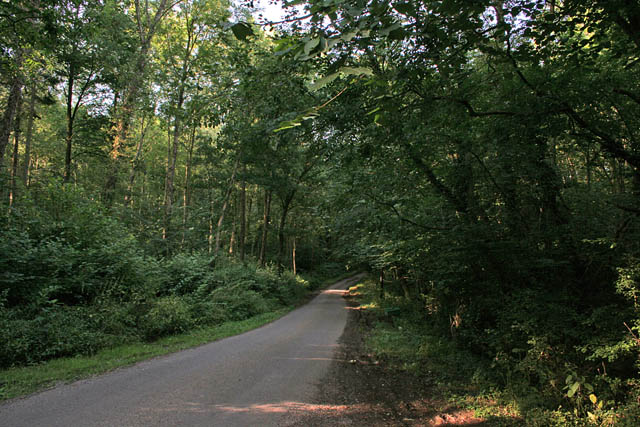
- Lane through Tugby Wood
- Location of Leighfield Forest.
- Area of search: Leicestershire
- Grid reference: SK 487 301
- Interest: Biological
- Area: 11.3 hectares (28 acres)
- Notification date: 1983
- Location map: Magic Map

Leighfield Forest SSSI is an 11.3 hectares (28 acres) biological Site of Special Scientific Interest east of Skeffington in Leicestershire, England. It consists of several fragments, including Tugby Wood, Loddington Reddish, Brown's Wood, Skeffington Wood and Tilton Wood, of the former medieval hunting Leighfield Forest, which straddles Leicestershire and Rutland. It is a Nature Conservation Review site, Grade II.

These woods in the Eye Brook valley date back at least to the thirteenth century. The dominant trees are ash and oak. The diverse moths and beetles include some rare species, and others are at the northern limit of their distribution. There are also areas of grassland and marsh.

Roads and footpaths go through some of the woods but others are private.
