= Shenton Hall =

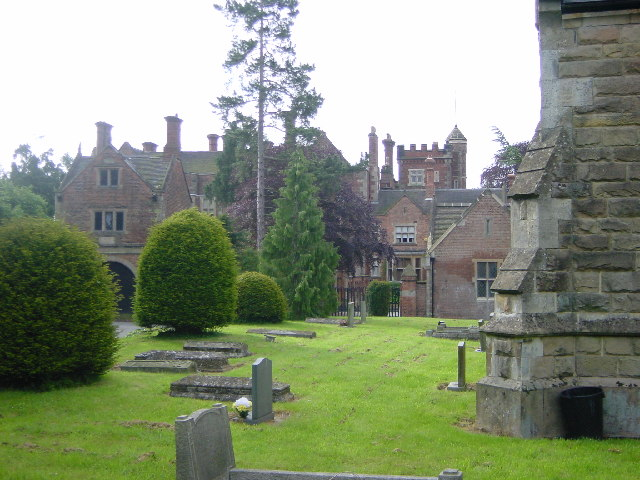
- Shenton Hall in 2002, seen beyond the gatehouse from the churchyard of St John the Evangelist.
- Interactive map of Shenton Hall
- 52.5992°N 1.4295°W
- Location: Shenton, Leicestershire, England

History
- Built: 1629
- Built for: William Wollaston

Shenton Hall is a country house opposite the church of St John the Evangelist, in the village of Shenton, in Leicestershire, England. It is recorded in the National Heritage List for England as a designated Grade II* listed building.

The house and estate is privately owned and not open to the public.

== History ==
=== 1086 -1626 ===
The manor of Shenton was first mentioned in the Domesday Book of 1086 as 'Scentone', where it is recorded as being owned by the Norman magnate, administrator and landowner Henry de Ferrers. This manor formed the estate that belongs to Shenton Hall today.

It is thought that a house stood on the site of Shenton Hall before the 17th-century, but little is known about it. Evidence for this is archaeological rather than recorded, as in ‘The Buildings of England’ series, Nikolaus Pevsner observed that a 16th-century doorcase in the basement at Shenton Hall was “possible evidence of an earlier house”.

In William Burton’s ‘Description of Leicester Shire’ (1622), it is noted that the Everard family once owned the estate - and presumably the earlier house that existed - with Richard Everard, who died in 1556, having been buried at St John the Evangelist opposite. A brass wall memorial to the Everard family can be seen in the north trancept of the church today. By the time Burton was writing in 1622, however, Sir Richard Molineux had inherited Shenton. Molineux later died in 1622, and Shenton was passed to one of his heirs.

=== 1626 - ===
William Wollaston purchased the 2,300-acre (930 ha) estate at Shenton in 1626 (or 1625, by some accounts). He was born in 1581 to Henry Wollaston and Sarah Burgis. Though the family had humble origins from Staffordshire, Henry Wollaston had established a successful drapery business in the City of London, after being apprenticed to a woollen draper as a young man. In 1616, Henry Wollaston died and William - being his eldest son - inherited his father’s profitable business, which enabled him to purchase Shenton Hall.

William Wollaston had first married the daughter of a clothier, Anne Worsley in 1614, who died in 1616. Later that year he then married Anne Whitgreve and by 1626, had two sons, Henry and William. Another son, John Wollaston, was born at Shenton in 1627 but died in the same year, therefore making him the first Wollaston to be buried at St John the Evangelist.

Records state that William Wollaston did not begin to build (or rebuild) Shenton Hall until 1629. Wollaston displayed this date along with his initials on a stone tablet set into the gatehouse (“WW 1629“). The construction of Shenton Hall would have greatly improved their status as members of the gentry. This is evident as - in the same year - Wollaston was appointed High Sheriff of Leicestershire. Given this, he was thought to have had royalist sympathies during the English Civil War (1642-1651), but did not have an active role.

William Wollaston survived his first son Henry at his death in December 1666. Thus, his second son - also named William - inherited Shenton Hall. He married Elizabeth Cave and had two daughters, Anne and Rebecca, that survived into adulthood. Like his father, William Wollaston was appointed High Sheriff of Leicestershire in 1672. His eldest daughter, Anne, married Sir John Chester in 1686 at Shenton, and believed that they would inherit Shenton Hall. However at her father's death in August 1688, though he bequeathed large sums to both his daughters, Shenton was passed to a male cousin, the priest, writer and philosopher also named William Wollaston.

William Wollaston, the cousin, only received the reversion of Shenton Hall, meaning that it would presumably return to the male heir of Anne and Sir John Chester. Sir John Chester and Anne Chester continued to live at Shenton Hall, even after Wollaston's death in 1724, when his widow Mrs. Wollaston owned the house. Sir John Chester eventually inherited Chicheley Hall, and moved there to rebuild it in the Baroque style.

The house was greatly extended to the rear in 1862. The Wollastons occupied the house until 1940. During World War II the army took possession and the prisoners of war were accommodated on the estate.

== Architecture ==
The entry for the Grade II* listing from Historic England reads:

House. c.1620 but doubled in size in the mid C19...brick with stone dressings and plain tiled roof. Entrance front of three storeys and six bays, asymmetrical. The outer bays are segmental full height bay windows set beneath coped gables, and the central bay is a full height canted bay window which contains the former doorway, now a window. Four light mullioned and transomed windows on each floor to its left, along with a side wall stack. ... High parapet runs between the outer gables. Main entrance now in eastern elevation in full height bay, part of the Victorian additions, in a Jacobean style with segmentally arched doorway and strapwork relief decoration above. Victorian range echoes the style of the original, but on a bigger scale, using large mullioned and transomed windows, departing from the domestic scale only with a machicolated tower at the western angle.

The architectural historian Nikolaus Pevsner wrote about the notable "chimneypiece of 1649, carved with hunting and biblical scenes " that is fixed in the sitting-room next to the drawing-room on the south-east front. Commenting more generally on the house, he remarked that it has a "romantic, distinctly Victorian silhouette".
