= Eye Brook Valley Woods =

Nature reserve in Leicestershire, England

Coordinates: 52.563°N 0.782°W

- Site of Special Scientific Interest
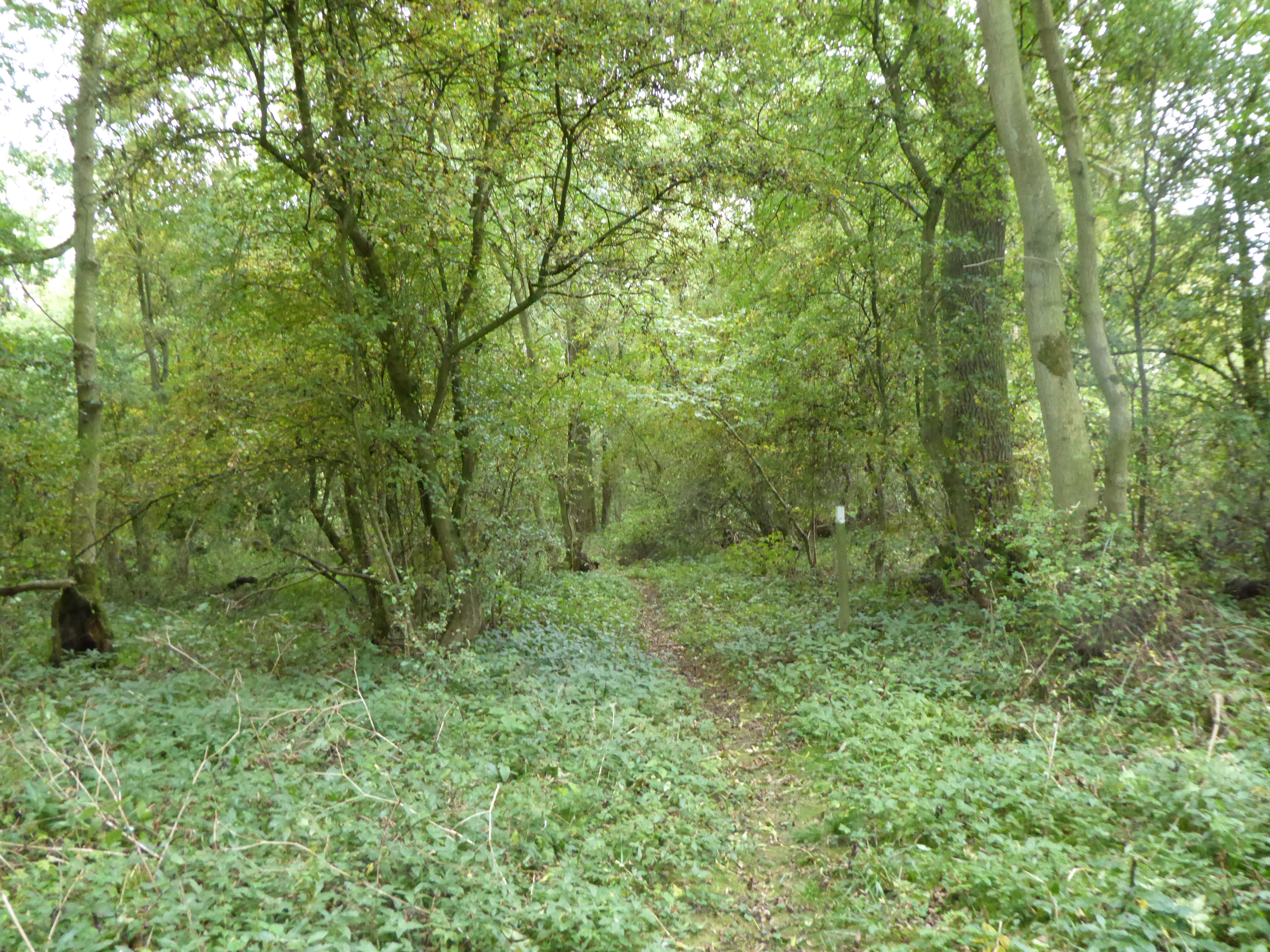
- Great Merrible Wood
- Location of Eye Brook Valley Woods.
- Area of search: Leicestershire
- Grid reference: SP 828 970
- Interest: Biological
- Area: 65.7 hectares
- Notification date: 1983
- Location map: Magic Map

Eye Brook Valley Woods is a 65.7-hectare (162-acre) biological Site of Special Scientific Interest east of Hallaton in Leicestershire. It is in three separate areas, Great Merrible Wood, which is managed by the Leicestershire and Rutland Wildlife Trust, Bolt Wood and Park Wood.

These are surviving fragments of the medieval Leighfield Forest. Park Wood is mainly ash and wych elm, while Bolt Wood and Great Merrible Wood are dominated by ash and field maple. The shrub flora is diverse, and there are also several small pools and marshes.

There is access to Great Merrible Wood by a footpath from Stockerston Lane, but the other woods are private.
