= Edward Ferrers (died 1535) =

English courtier, knight and Member of Parliament

Sir Edward Ferrers (by 1468 – 29 August 1535) of Baddesley Clinton, Warwickshire was an English courtier, knight and Member of Parliament.

He was the eldest son of Sir Henry Ferrers of Hambleton, Rutland and East Peckham, Kent and his second wife, Margaret Hextall of East Peckham and widow of William Whetenhall. He succeeded his father in 1500 and was knighted at Tournai in 1513.

Introduced at court he became an Esquire of the body by 1509 and a sewer by 1511. He served as a Justice of the Peace for Warwickshire and sat on various commissions. He was pricked High Sheriff of Warwickshire and Leicestershire for 1513–14 and 1518–19.

In 1520 he accompanied Henry VIII, along with other knights, to Henry's meeting with Francis I of France at the Field of the Cloth of Gold.

He was returned to Parliament in 1529 as a knight of the shire for Warwickshire and chosen in 1528 to replace the deceased William Compton as High Sheriff of Worcestershire, a position he held until his death in 1535.

He had married in 1497, Constance, the daughter and coheiress of Nicholas Brome (d.1517) of Baddesley Clinton, with whom he had 4 sons and 6 daughters. He established their home at Baddesley Clinton.

On his death he was buried at Baddesley and was succeeded by his grandson Edward, his eldest son having died.
