= John Story (cricketer) =

English cricketer and British Army officer

Personal information
- Full name: John Bainbrigge Story
- Born: 29 July 1812; Woodborough, Nottinghamshire, England
- Died: 7 January 1872 (aged 59); Lockington, Leicestershire, England
- Batting: Unknown
- Relatives: William Story (nephew)

Career statistics
Competition	First-class
Matches	4
Runs scored	52
Batting average	6.50
100s/50s	–/–
Top score	25
Catches/stumpings	1/–
- Source: Cricinfo, 22 November 2019

John Bainbrigge Story JP DL (29 July 1812 – 7 January 1872) was an English first-class cricketer and British Army officer.

The son of John Bainbrigge Story senior, he was born in July 1812 at Woodborough, Nottinghamshire. He was educated at Eton College, before going up to Corpus Christi College, Oxford. After graduating from Oxford, Story enlisted in the Leicestershire Yeomanry as a cornet in January 1832, with promotion to the rank of lieutenant in September 1835. He served as the High Sheriff of Leicestershire in 1842. Story made his debut in first-class cricket for the Gentlemen of the North against the Gentlemen of the South in 1858, making a total of four appearances in the fixture to 1861. Besides his brief first-class career, Story had a long association with Derbyshire prior to the formation of Derbyshire County Cricket Club. He ended his military career with the Leicestershire Yeomanry as a major, in addition to serving as a justice of the peace. He died at his home at Lockington Hall in January 1872 and was survived by his wife, whom he had married in 1833. His nephew, William Story, also played first-class cricket.
