= Lockington Hall =

Country house in Lockington, Leicestershire, England

Coordinates: 52.8490°N 1.3063°W

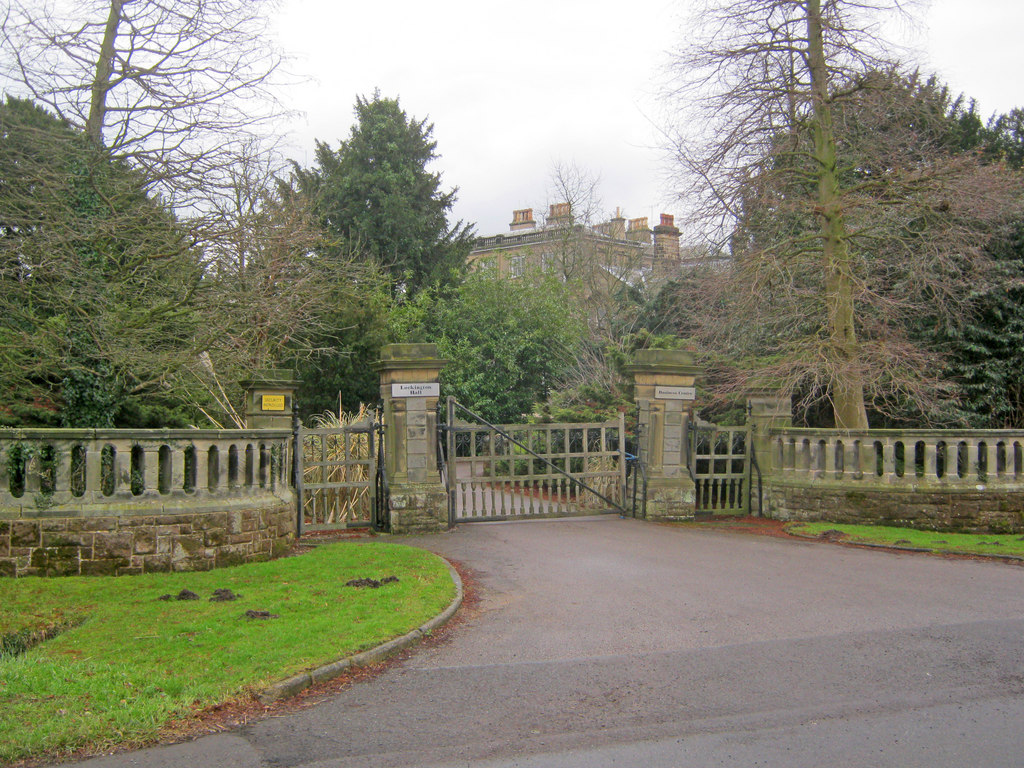
Entrance to Lockington Hall

Lockington Hall is a 17th-century country house, much improved and extended in later centuries, situated at Main Street, Hemington, Lockington, Leicestershire, and now converted to use as offices. It is a Grade II listed building.

The two manors of Lockington, viz Nether Hall and Over Hall were anciently held by the Abbot and Convent of Leicester. Both were sold after the Dissolution of the Monasteries to the Bainbrigge family. The house was built in about 1688 on the site of the former Nether Hall. The Bainbrigge line expired in about 1797 and the estate passed to Rev Phillip Story who remodelled the house, adding a second storey, and a Tuscan colonnade to the seven bayed east front. In 1872 the property was sold by John Bainbrigge Story (High Sheriff of Leicestershire 1842) to Nathaniel Charles Curzon of Breedon Hall ( a descendant of the brother of Sir John Curzon, first of the Curzon Baronets of Kedleston Hall. Curzon greatly extended the house, adding two service wings and a porte-cochere to the five bayed north entrance front.

Frances Curzon Newton of Mickleover Manor inherited the estate early in the 20th century and changed his name to Francis Curzon Curzon.

The house was converted for use as offices in 1973.
