= Ernest Clive Atkins =

Colonel Ernest Clive Atkins CB TD DL JP
- E.C. Atkins CB TD DL JP
- Born: 13 February 1870
- Died: 9 January 1953 (aged 82)
- Military career
- Allegiance: United Kingdom
- Branch: British Army
- Rank: Colonel
- Commands: 2/5th Battalion of the Leicestershire Regiment
- Conflicts: World War I
- Awards: CB TD
- Other work: High Sheriff of Leicestershire and Justice of the peace

Colonel Ernest Clive Atkins CB TD DL JP (13 February 1870 – 9 January 1953) was Battalion Commander of the 2/5th Leicestershire Regiment during World War I, High Sheriff of Leicestershire in 1931 and Chairman of the Leicestershire Territorial Association in 1938.

== Life ==
Ernest Clive Atkins, the eldest son of Arthur Atkins of Middlefield, Hinckley, was born 13 February 1870. He was educated at Bedford Modern School between 1882 and 1886.

Atkins was commissioned as a 2nd Lieutenant in the 1st Volunteer Battalion, Leicestershire Regiment on 22 April 1892. He was made Captain in 1896, Major in 1903 and commanded the newly formed 4th Battalion as Lieutenant-Colonel until 1909. In 1914, as Lieutenant-Colonel, he raised and commanded the 2/5th Battalion from 1914 until 1917, including during the Easter Rising of 1916. After 1917, Atkins commanded battalions of the East Surrey Regiment and the Middlesex Regiment.

Atkins was a military member of the TA Association of Leicestershire from 1908, Vice-Chairman between 1934 and 1938 and chairman from 1938 for which he was made CB. In 1940, he was appointed first Honorary Colonel of the 2/5th Battalion of the Leicestershire Regiment.

Atkins was made a Deputy Lieutenant of Leicestershire in 1928, and High Sheriff of Leicestershire in 1931.

In 1900 Atkins married Agnes Pidcock, the daughter of Reverend Benjamin Pidock of Easton, Hampshire. They had three sons and one daughter. Atkins died on 9 January 1953.
