= Muriel de Lisle =

Pioneering Girl Guide leader

- Born: Elizabeth Muriel Smythe Guinness; 20 January 1892; Dublin, Ireland
- Died: 30 March 1974 (aged 82); Leicester, England
- Known for: Girl Guides
- Spouses: John Adrian Frederick March Phillipps de Lisle (m. 1924; died 1961)
- Children: 4

Muriel de Lisle (20 January 1892 – 30 March 1974) was instrumental in the early years of Girl Guiding in Warwickshire. She was a recipient of the Silver Fish Award, Girl Guiding's highest adult honour.

== Personal life ==
Elizabeth Muriel Smythe Guinness, the only daughter of Robert Darley Guinness (1858-1953) and Lydia Lucy Lyster Guinness (née Smyth) (1893-1947) was born in Dublin, Ireland. She had one brother, Richard Smyth Guinness. The family moved to Wootton Hall in Wootton Wawen, Warwickshire in 1912. She married John Adrian Frederick March Phillipps de Lisle (1891-1961) in 1924. After their wedding they moved to Narayanjanj in East Bengal (present-day Bangladesh) where John was involved with jute manufacturing. They returned to England the following year. They had four children: Alathea, Elizabeth, Everard and Julian.

By the late 1920s she was living in Snitterfield, Stratford-Upon-Avon where she was on the board of the Snitterfield Nursing Association. During World War II she served as a nurse in the Voluntary Aid Detachment (VAD). By the mid-1950s she was living at Stockerston Hall in Uppingham, Leicestershire, where she lived until her death in 1974.

== Girl Guides and Boy Scouts ==
de Lisle was “one of the original Guides in Warwickshire”. She established the Girl Guide and Boy Scout units in the village of Wootton Wawen. By 1924 she was the Assistant County Commissioner and Division Commissioner for Warwickshire Girl Guides. After moving to Snitterfield in the late 1920s she was instrumental in reviving the local Guiding movement, which had lapsed for several years, and was also involved with the local Boy Scout movement as a member of the local Scout committee. She was a recipient of the Silver Fish Award, Girl Guiding's highest adult honour, presented by Lady Baden-Powell, in 1925. In 1942 she presented the World Flag and Union Jack to Snitterfield Girl Guides.
