= Breedon Hall =

Historic building near Derby, England

Coordinates: 52.8028°N 1.3997°W

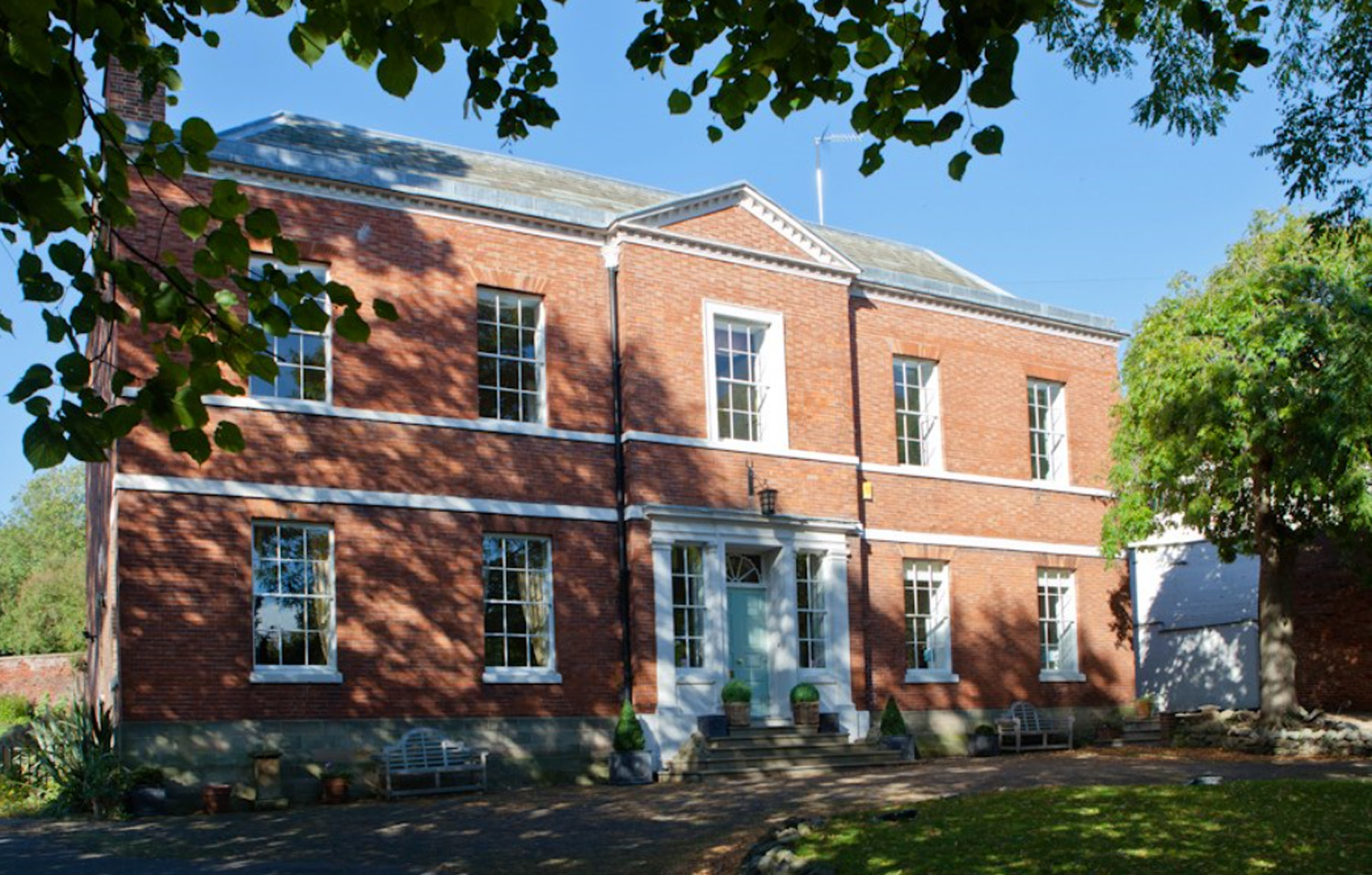
Breedon Hall

Breedon Hall, Breedon on the Hill in north-west Leicestershire, is a house of historical significance and is listed on the English Heritage Register. In 1620 it was a small timber-framed cottage. Soon after it was bought by the Curzon family and was successively enlarged until 1777 when it was given a new Georgian front. It was the ancestral home of the Curzons for over three centuries and then bought by the Shields family. Today it is owned by the Meynell family who provided bed-and-breakfast accommodation until 2025.

== Curzon family ==
When the Curzon family bought the Breedon Estate in about 1620 there was a small cottage on the property. Richard Curzon was the owner at this time. His father was John Curzon of Kedleston. When Richard died in 1690 his son John Curzon became the owner. In 1700 John married Mary Lilley, the daughter of Rowland Lilley. Their son Rev John Curzon became the owner of Breedon Hall in 1703 when his father died. It seems that his mother Mary may have continued to live there until her death in 1737 as he was the rector of Kedleston. In 1722 the Reverend married Anne Toone, daughter of Thomas Toone.

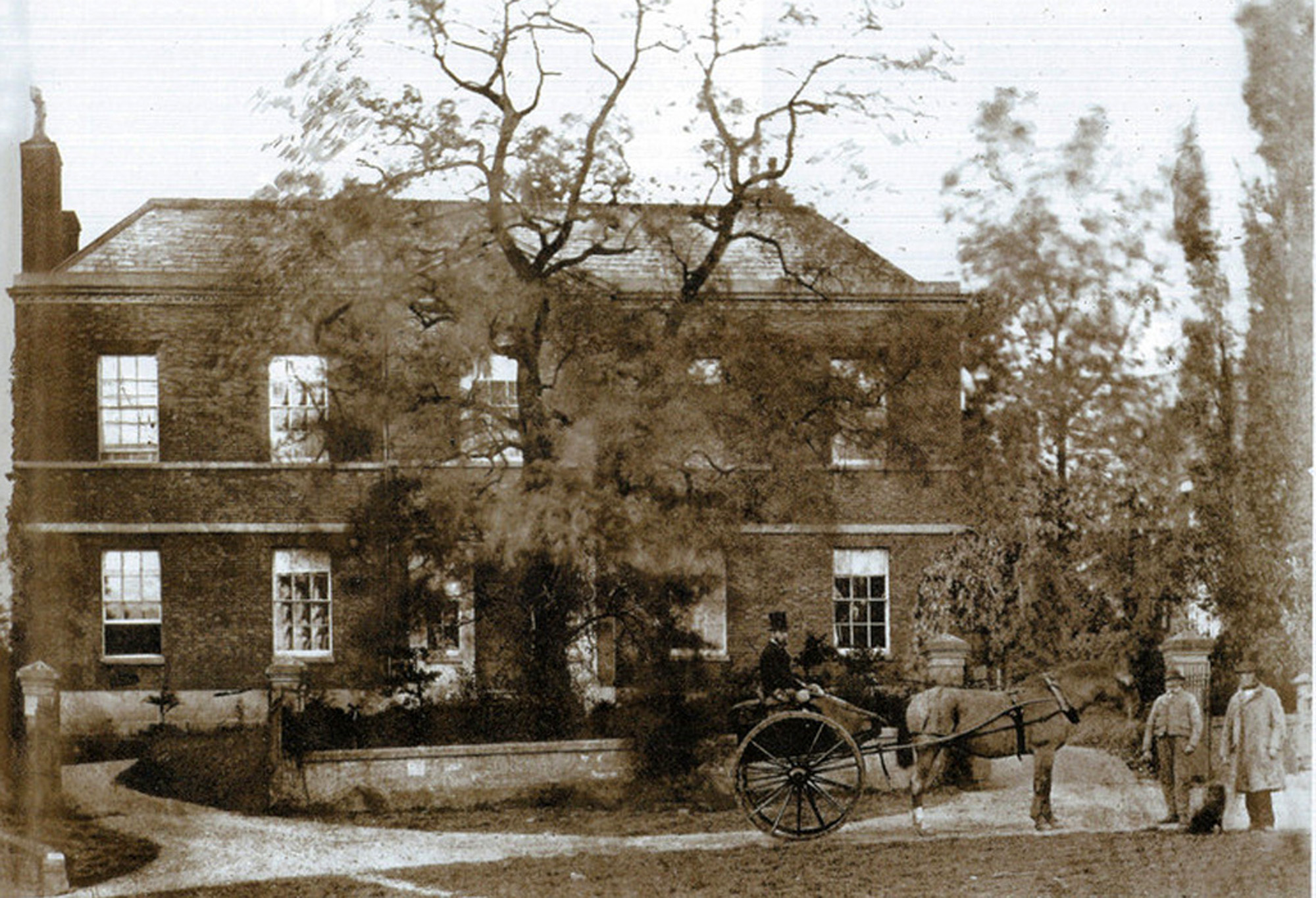
Nathaniel Charles Curzon in the trap outside Breedon Hall in 1870

Their eldest surviving son Nathaniel Curzon inherited the Hall in 1739. However, as he was only an infant, his mother administered his affairs until he came of age. In 1775 Nathaniel married Anne Farnell, daughter and coheir of John Farnell of Overseal. She was described in the newspaper of the time as being "an agreeable young lady with a fortune of ten thousand pounds." The couple had three children, and their eldest son John Curzon became the owner of Breedon in 1787 when his father died. He was the longest owner of the hall as he was the proprietor for 77 years.

John was an attorney and in 1827 he married Rosamond Martha Hope, daughter of Rev Charles Stead Hope, the mayor of Derby. Their eldest surviving son, Nathaniel Charles Curzon, inherited the hall in 1864 when John died.

Nathaniel Charles Curzon, who was a barrister, and had inherited numerous properties. Besides Breedon Hall he owned large properties at Belton, Worthington, Overseal, Netherseal, Bruntingthope, Knaptoft, Sutton-in-the-Elms, Castle Donington, Hemington, Long Whaton, Kegworth, Derby, Long Eaton and Alveston. He was also prominent in community affairs and was High Sheriff of Derbyshire. In 1853 he married Emily Frances Anne Buckston, daughter of Rev. German Buckston of Bradbourne Hall. He was an extremely wealthy man and in 1872 he bought Lockington Hall and moved there to live after he restored the property and made additions. A photo is shown of Nathaniel outside Breedon Hall in 1870 shortly before he moved. The couple had no children so when Nathaniel died in 1897 his brother William inherited the house.

William Curzon lived in Lockington Hall and Breedon Hall continued to be rented to wealthy tenants. He did not marry and when he died in 1916 his nephew Major Francis Curzon Newton inherited the property. He was the son of his sister Ann Rosamond Curzon who had married Charles Edward Newton. Francis changed his name to Curzon in 1916 in accordance with the Will to become Francis Curzon Curzon.

When he died in 1918 his eldest son John Curzon became the owner when he came of age in 1934. This event was celebrated at Lockington Hall, and it is noted that the then tenant of Breedon Hall Captain John Shields was a prominent guest. John sold the Hall to the Shields family in 1944.

== Other residents ==
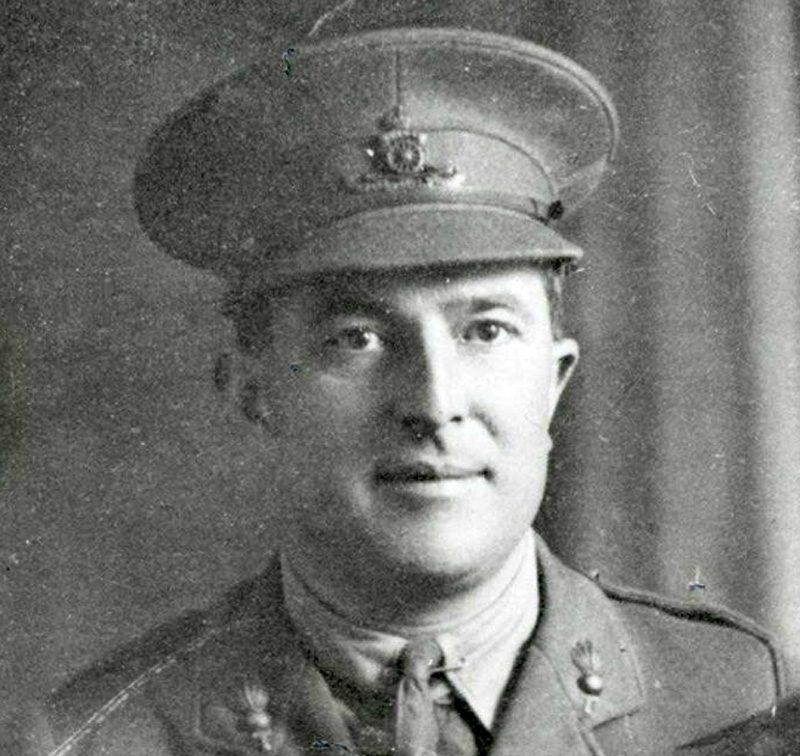
John Shields at the time of his marriage in 1917

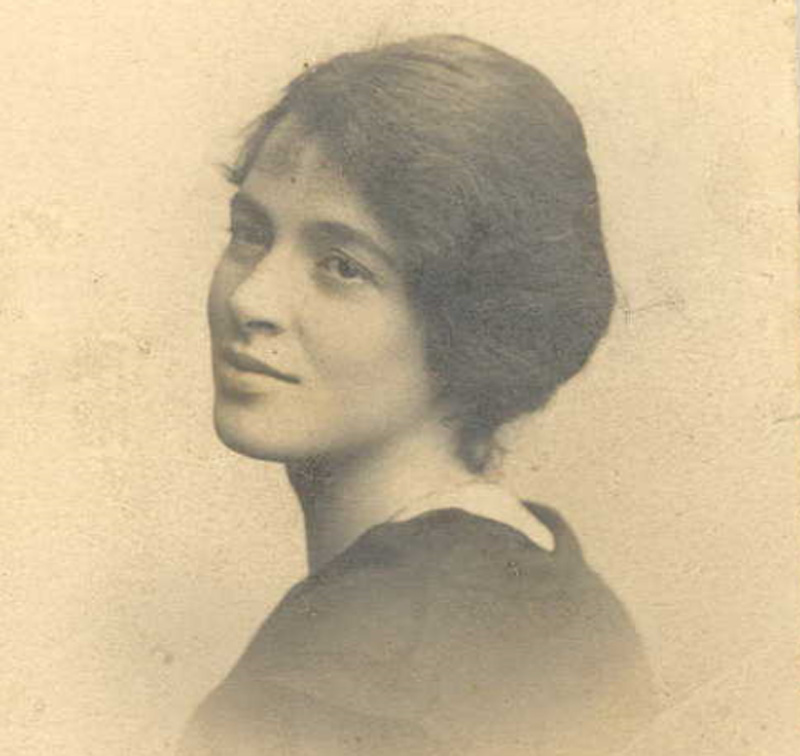
Eva Shields, John Shields's wife in about 1920

When Nathaniel Curzon moved to Lockington Hall in 1872 he rented to house for many years to Lieutenant-Colonel William Robinson Partridge and his family. He was the only child of William Partridge of Edgbaston, Worcestershire and was educated at the University of Oxford. In 1863 he married Frances Wilson. The couple had six children.

In 1917 after his marriage John Shields rented Breedon Hall. He was born in 1882 and was the eldest son of John Gillies Shields, who owned Isley Walton Hall and Estate. He played first class cricket for Leicestershire between 1906 and 1923 and often served as captain. He is shown in the inset of this photo of the Leicestershire Cricket Team of 1913 at this reference. He was a lieutenant during the First World War, and in 1917 he married Emma (called Eva) Eleanor Cornelius, who was the daughter of Alexander Fitzgerald Cornelius of Ballytarsna House in Ireland. Their marriage was reported in the newspapers. One article stated that the bridegroom came from France (where he was fighting) on short leave for the wedding. It also said: "A reception was held at Ballytarsna House and the newly married pair crossed to England and motored home from Birmingham on Friday evening. This was the bride’s first visit to England. The approaches to Isley Walton were gaily decorated. They will reside at Breedon Hall, Breedon-on-the Hill near Derby."

The couple lived at the hall for 27 years had four children during that time. In 1943 John's father died and this family inherited the Isley Walton Estate. They moved into Isley Walton Hall the following year and John's younger brother Charles Frederick Shields moved to Breedon Hall. He bought the property from the Curzon family in 1944.

Charles had married Lily May Summerfield in 1921, and by this time they had had four children. Charles died in 1968, and his wife Lily continued to live at the hall until her death in 1980. The house was then sold.
