= Thomas Cave (died 1609) =

16th-century English politician

Sir Thomas Cave (ca. 1540 – 6 October 1609) was an English landowner and Member of Parliament.

He was the son of Francis Cave of Baggrave, Leicestershire, MP and custos rotulorum for Leicestershire. Thomas was educated at the Middle Temple (1561), succeeded his father in 1583 and was knighted in 1603.

== Career ==
He was elected a member (MP) of the Parliament of England for Leicester in 1571. He became a justice of the peace for Leicestershire by 1574 and was pricked High Sheriff of Leicestershire for 1579–80 and 1592–93. He was appointed deputy lieutenant for the county by 1588.

== Personal life ==
He married three times: firstly Catherine, the daughter and coheiress of Thomas Colt of Newhall, Essex, with whom he had a son, secondly Isabella Wake and thirdly Anne, the daughter of (?James) Lany with whom he had a further 2 sons and 5 daughters.
