= Bolt Wood =

Woodland in Leicestershire, England

Coordinates: 52.564°N 0.782°W

Bolt Wood is near to the western boundary of the Parish of Stockerston, Leicestershire, England. It is suggested that the woodland on this boundary is part of that mentioned in the Domesday Book. Bolt Wood was part of the extensive Royal medieval Leighfield Forest. The first written reference to Bolt Wood is in an undated charter probably dating before the reign of Henry VI, in which it is referred to as 'Boutewood'. An alternative date offered is between 1422 and 1461.

== Site of special scientific interest ==
Bolt Wood is part of the Eye Brook Valley Woods Site of Special Scientific Interest (SSSI). The Eye Brook Valley Woods are designated as Sites of Specific Scientific Interest because they are the best existing examples of ash-elm and ash-maple woodlands in Leicestershire, and noted for their flora and breeding bird population. Bolt Wood is characterised by ash and field maple trees.

Bolt Wood

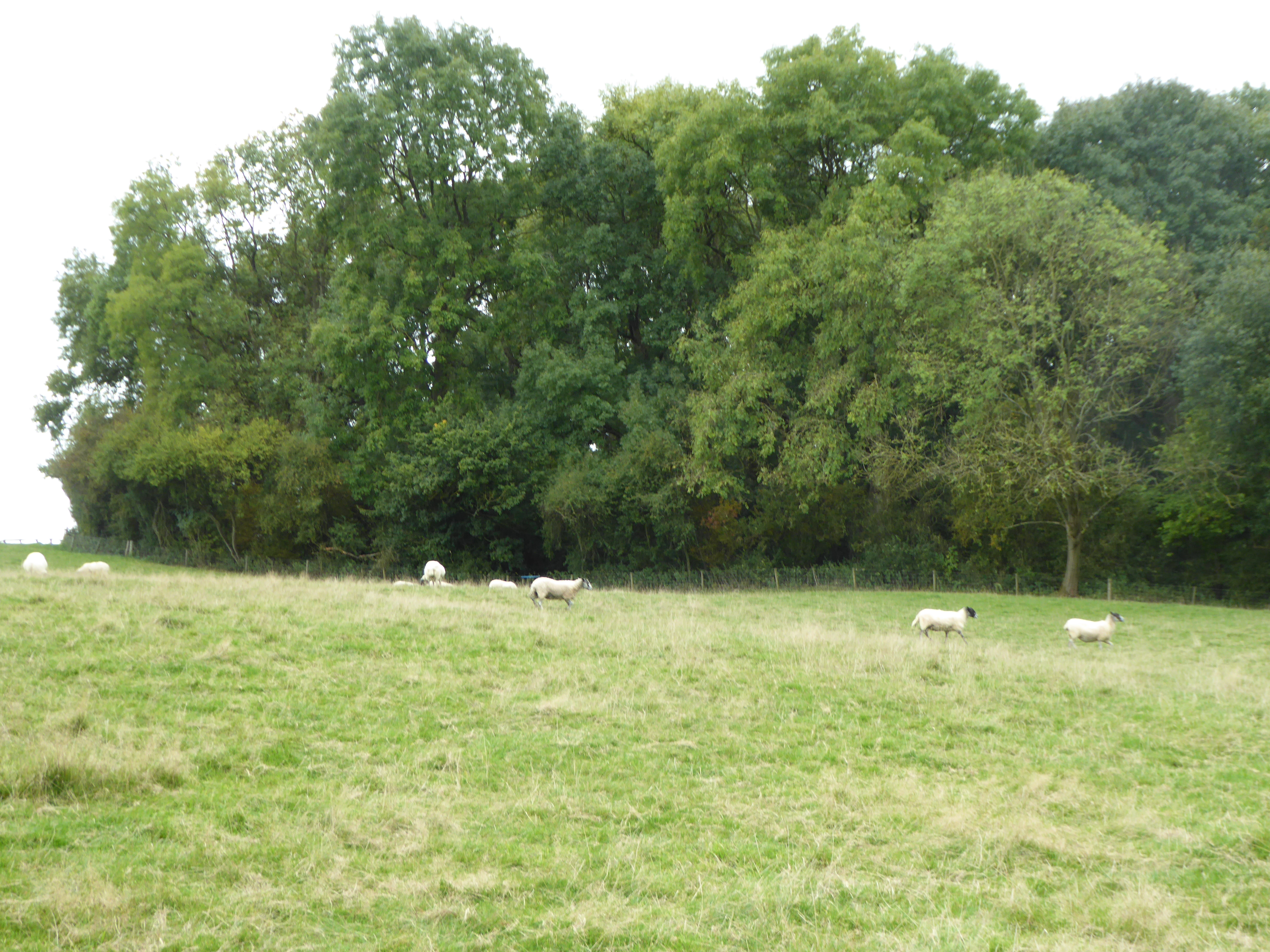

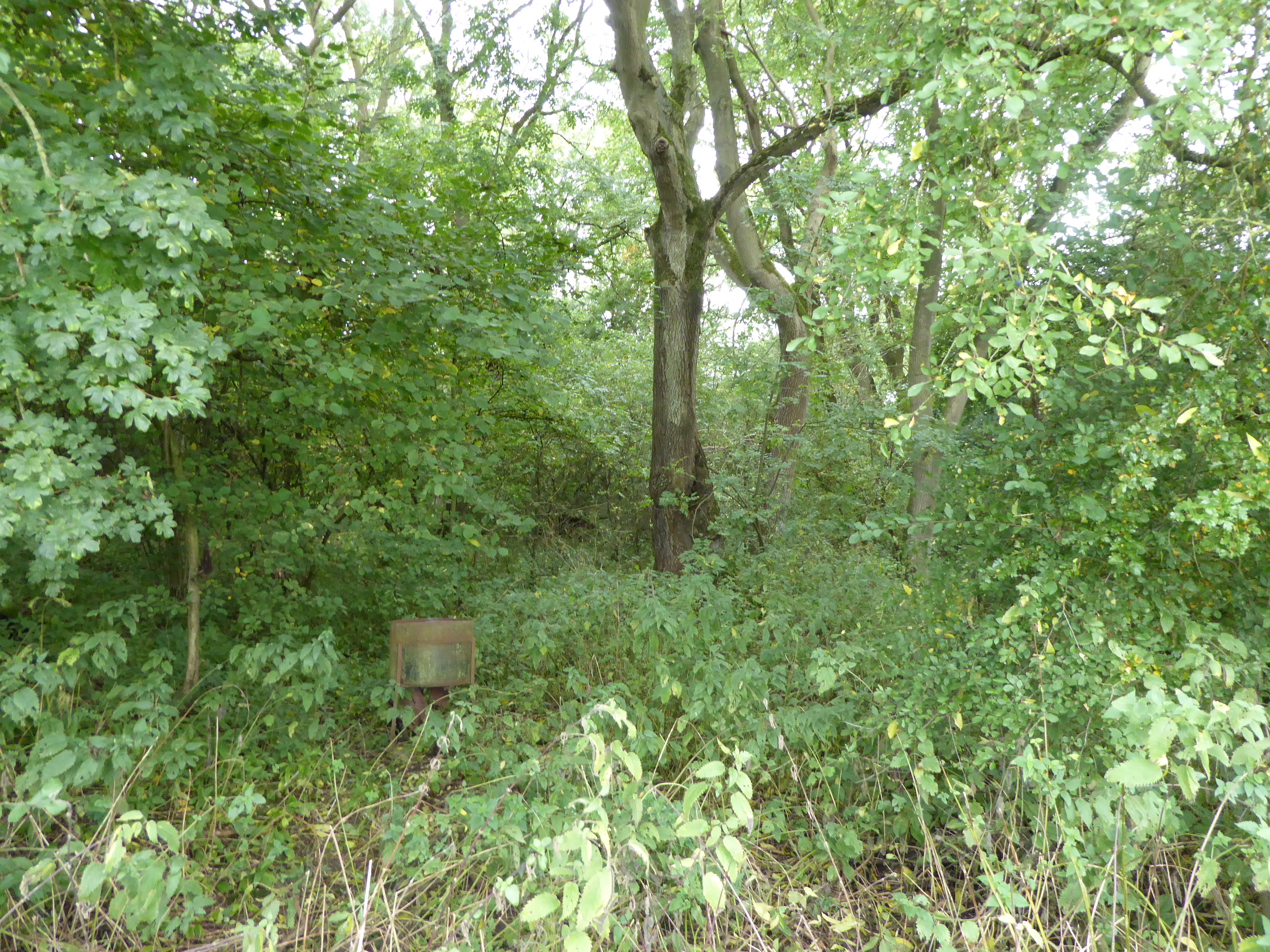

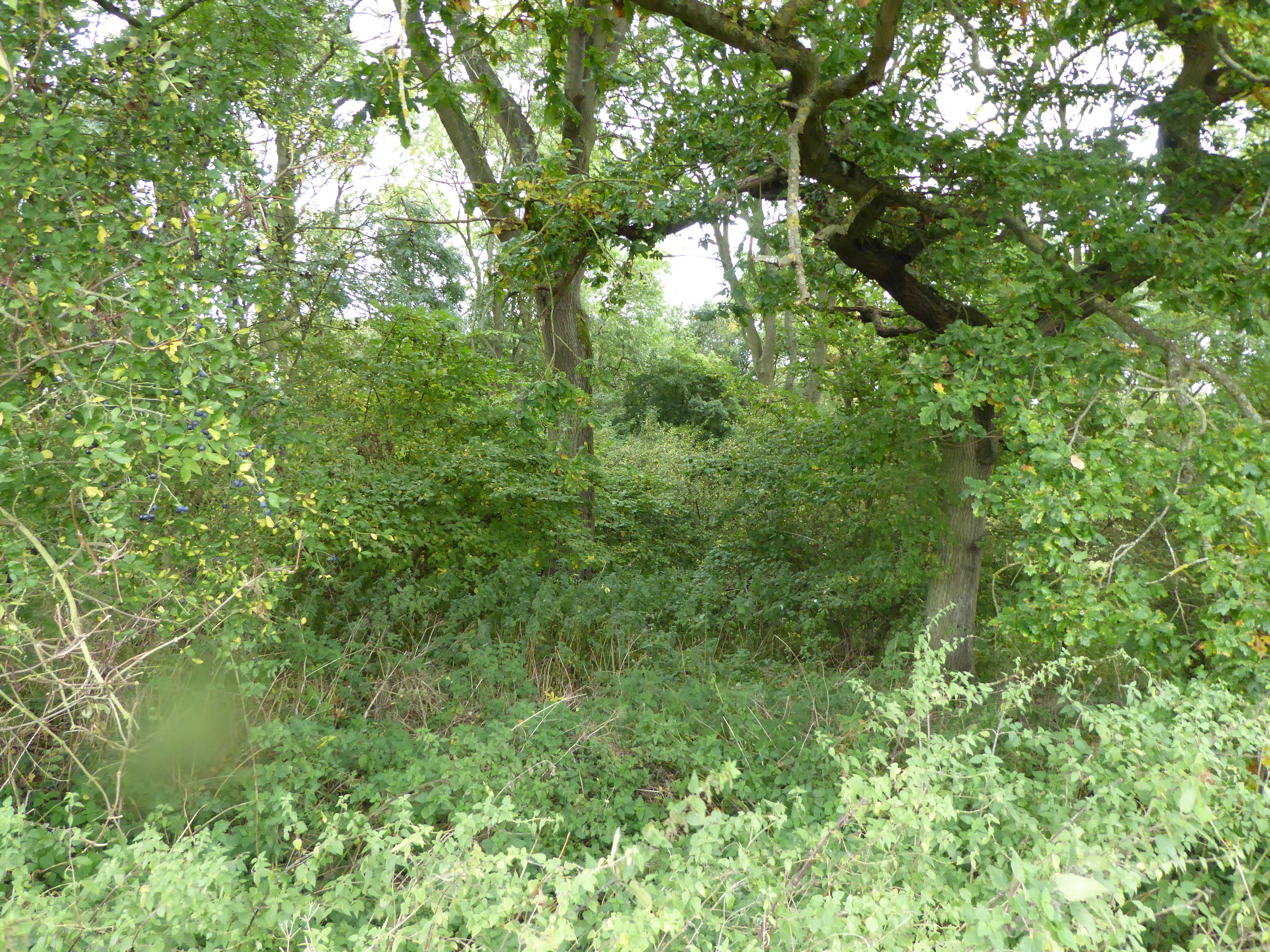
