= Great Merrible Wood =

Nature reserve in Leicestershire, England

Coordinates: 52.557°N 0.771°W

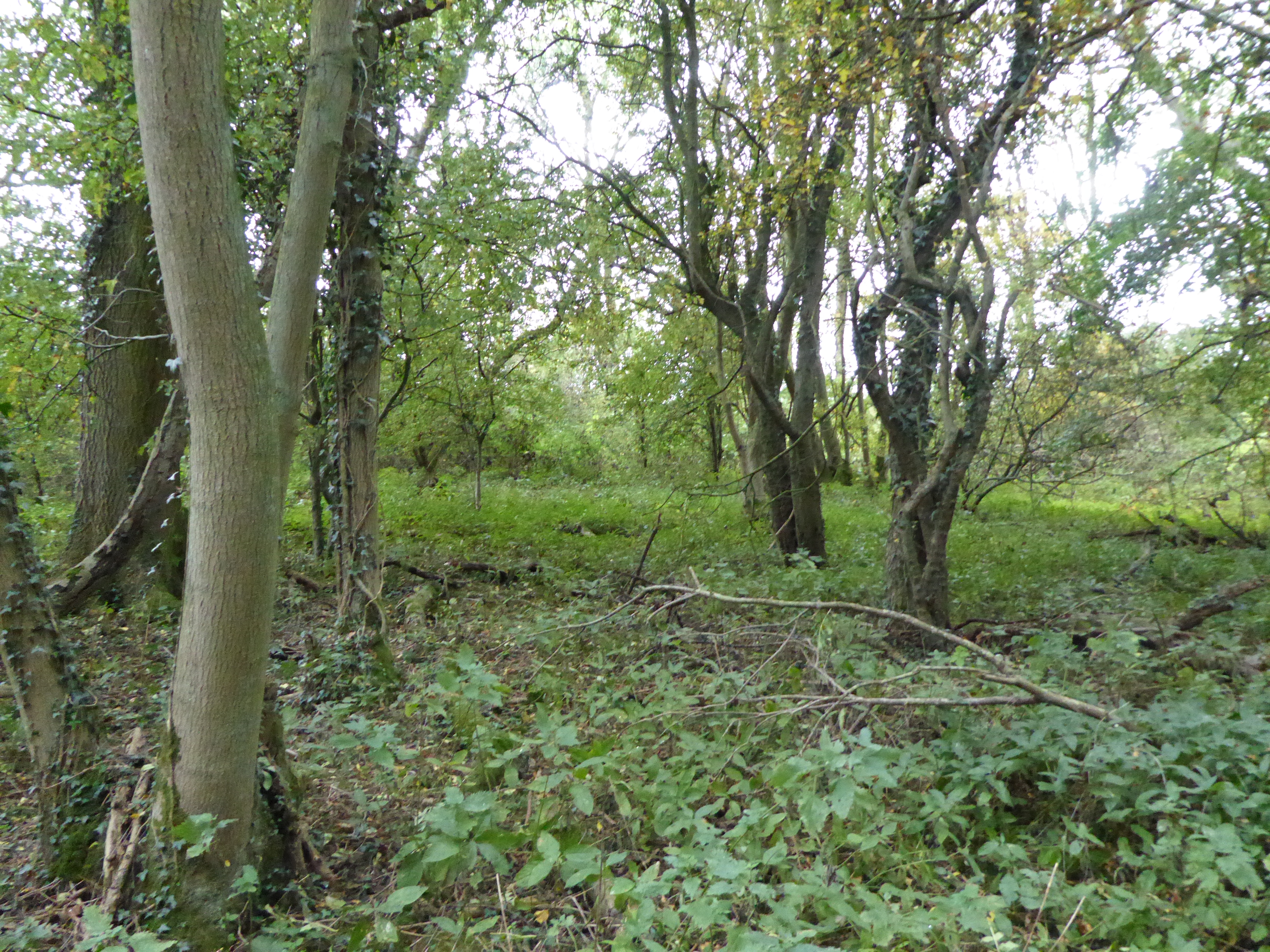
- Interactive map of Great Merrible Wood
- Type: Nature reserve
- Location: Hallaton, Leicestershire
- OS grid: SP 834962
- Area: 12 hectares (30 acres)
- Manager: Leicestershire and Rutland Wildlife Trust

Great Merrible Wood is a 12 hectare nature reserve east of Hallaton in Leicestershire. It is owned and managed by the Leicestershire and Rutland Wildlife Trust, and is part of the Eye Brook Valley Woods Site of Special Scientific Interest.

This is a surviving fragment of the medieval Leighfield Forest. It is semi-natural ancient woodland with several unusual herbs, such as broadleaved helleborine, herb paris and violet helleborine. It is claimed to have the most diverse range of fungi in the county.

There is access by a footpath from Stockerston Lane.
