= Jack Storey =

Jack Storey may refer to:

- Jack Storey (footballer) (1929–2026), Australian rules footballer
- Jack Storey, character in Before I Wake (1954 film)

== See also ==
- John Storey (disambiguation)
