= Bosworth Hall, Husbands Bosworth =

Houses in Husbands Bosworth, Leicestershire, England

Coordinates: 52.4536°N 1.0490°W

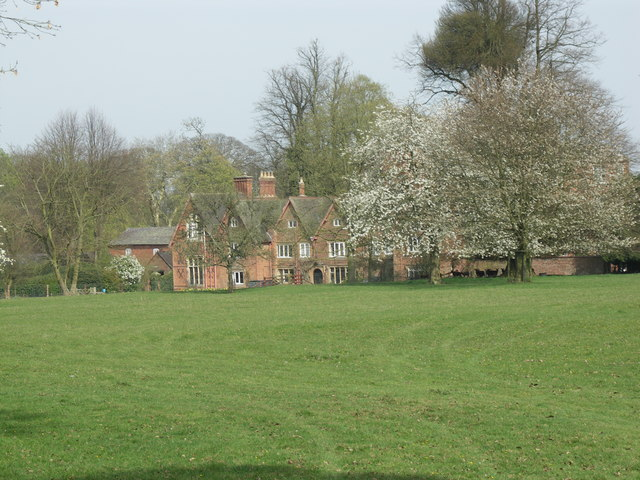
Bosworth Hall, Husbands Bosworth

Bosworth Hall actually consists of two houses, the Old Hall and a newer Georgian-style hall, situated in Theddingworth Road, Husbands Bosworth, Leicestershire. The Old Hall, originally constructed in Norman times, was substantially renovated in the 16th century as a west facing country house. The new and additional Georgian hall was then built facing south west, adjoining the older house, in about 1790. In about 1870 a Victorian Gothic wing was created to link the two buildings. The whole is a Grade II* listed building.

The older Tudor house has two storeys with attics in a range of five gables. Some traces of the original Norman construction can be seen in the present building. A 19th century wing to the left added a sixth gable to the frontage. To the south the 1870 wing created the link to the three-storey, five-bay Georgian house.

== History ==
The Old Hall was originally a cruck Norman building owned, from about 1293 to 1537, by the de Stoke family and then by the Smith family, amongst others, until 1632. Erasmus Smith, who lived there from 1570 to 1616, was quite a wealthy man and probably carried out many of the Elizabethan alterations. Bosworth was then bought by Lady Grace Fortescue, (née Manners) of Hardwick Hall, the widow of Sir Francis Fortescue of Salden, Buckinghamshire. Lady Grace, who lived in the Old Hall with her son William, was a Catholic recusant, the first of several to live in the hall. According to legend, a stain on the drawing room floor is that of sacramental wine, spilt by a Catholic priest as he hurriedly tried to clear it away. It is said to still feel damp.

In 1763, Maria Alethea Fortescue died unmarried, and the house passed to her 11-year-old cousin Francis Turville, who later changed his name to Turville-Fortescue. He and his wife and moved to Bosworth in 1790 and commissioned John Wagstaff to design and build the present Georgian hall, linked to the older building through a "friendship door". His son George extended the new building in 1832. George's son Francis inherited in 1859 and built a Victorian Gothic style church in the park in 1873. Francis's wife, known as Lady Lisgar, was responsible for commissioning the inner library between the two buildings.

In 1907 the house passed to Oswald Petre, a cousin of Francis, who changed his name to Turville-Petre to ensure the continuity of the Turville name at Bosworth. Oswald died in 1941, but his widow, Margaret (née Cave) continued to live at Bosworth. During World War II the Old Hall was let to various families and an army camp established in the park, where many Americans were based prior to the battle of Arnhem.

At the end of the war Margaret's daughter Alethea and her husband, David Constable-Maxwell, came to live at Bosworth and also added 'Turville' to their name. They restored the now run-down buildings, demolished the barracks and let the Old Hall as a separate dwelling. The present owner of the estate, Robert Turville Constable-Maxwell, is a Deputy Lieutenant of Leicestershire and was High Sheriff of the county in 1991–92.
