= Husbands Bosworth =

Coordinates: 52.4526°N 1.0559°W

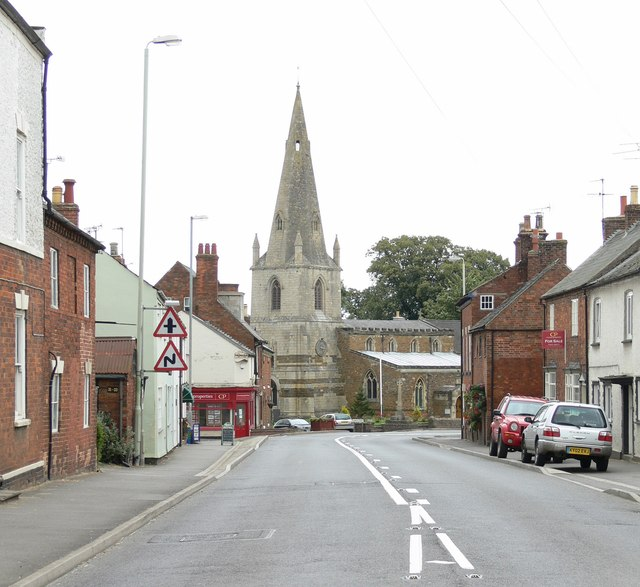
- Husbands Bosworth

- Location within Leicestershire
- Population: 1,145 (2011)
- OS grid reference: SP642842
- Civil parish: Husbands Bosworth
- District: Harborough
- Shire county: Leicestershire
- Region: East Midlands
- Country: England
- Sovereign state: United Kingdom
- Post town: LUTTERWORTH
- Postcode district: LE17
- Dialling code: 01858
- Police: Leicestershire
- Fire: Leicestershire
- Ambulance: East Midlands
- UK Parliament: South Leicestershire

Husbands Bosworth is a large crossroads village in South Leicestershire on the A5199 road from Leicester city to Northampton and the A4304 road from Junction 20 of the M1 motorway to Market Harborough. The population of the village was 1,027 at the 2011 census.

To the north of the village the Grand Union Canal passes through a 1,166-yard (1,066 m) tunnel that bears the name of the village. The River Welland passes one mile to the south-east, very close to its source. The River Avon also passes close by, two miles to the south-west. On the southern boundary of the village is a thriving allotment site, immediately adjacent to the village's cemetery.

The nearest railway station is Market Harborough.

On 18 September 1608 in All Saints' church John Cook was baptised. He later became Solicitor General and later was the prosecutor in the trial of Charles I.

Husbands Bosworth is a centre for the Catholic Faith. Since the Reformation, Mass has been celebrated at Bosworth Hall. In the 1870s St Mary's Church was built to serve local Catholics. Today the church is served by the Personal Ordinariate of Our Lady of Walsingham. The Ordinariate allows former Anglicans to enter into the Catholic Church whilst retaining some of their traditions and style of worship. Sunday Mass is at 8am and 10am and there is also a midweek program of worship.

== RAF Husbands Bosworth ==
Royal Air Force Station Husbands Bosworth opened in 1943 with its main tenant being the Wellington Bombers of No. 85 Operational Training Unit (No.85 OTU), RAF Bomber Command. The unit was formed from an element from No.14 OTU and was tasked with training crews to undertake night bombing operations. No.85 OTU was disbanded on 14 June 1945, following which the Station was placed on care & maintenance before finally being decommissioned in 1946. It was then subsequently used to house displaced Polish families.

Today the airfield (at SP650827) is the home of a gliding club, and a National Police Air Service (NPAS) helicopter base. The truncated Sibbertoft Road now lies on what once was the main east–west runway.

== See also ==
- Bosworth Hall (Husbands Bosworth)
- Erasmus Smith
