= William Skeffington (died 1571) =

English politician

William Skeffington (by 1521 – 22 September 1571), of Skeffington, Leicestershire, was an English member of parliament.

He was the eldest son of Thomas Skeffington of Skeffington and succeeded his father in 1543.

He was a justice of the peace for Leicestershire from 1547 to his death and a Commissioner for Relief in 1550. He was elected a member (MP) of the Parliament of England for Leicestershire in 1555 and was appointed High Sheriff of Warwickshire and Leicestershire for 1560–61.

He married Mary, the daughter of Thomas Cave of Stanford, Northamptonshire; they had 2 sons and 3 daughters. He was succeeded by his eldest son Thomas.
