= Burton baronets =

Extinct baronetcy in the Baronetage of England

There have been two baronetcies created for persons with the surname Burton, one in the Baronetage of England and one in the Baronetage of Ireland. Both creations are extinct.

The Burton Baronetcy, of Stockerston in the County of Leicester, was created in the Baronetage of England on 22 July 1622 for Sir Thomas Burton, son of John Burton of Braunston who had purchased the Stockerston Hall estate in 1580. He was knighted in Dublin in 1605. He served as High Sheriff of Leicestershire in 1633. His son, the second Baronet, served the Royalist cause during the English Civil War and his estate was subsequently sequestered. Following the Restoration his son the third Baronet served as high sheriff in 1682. He sold Stockerston in 1690. The fourth and last Baronet was imprisoned for debt in 1710 and following conviction for theft in 1722 was transported. The baronetcy presumably became extinct on his death in circa 1750.

The Burton Baronetcy, of Pollacton in the County of Carlow, was created in the Baronetage of Ireland on 2 October 1758 for Sir Charles Burton, Lord Mayor of Dublin. The third and fourth Baronets served as High Sheriffs of County Carlow. The baronetcy became extinct on the death of the latter in 1902. The family seat Pollacton House was demolished in the 1970s.

== Burton baronets, of Stockerston (1622) ==
- Sir Thomas Burton, 1st Baronet (1580–1655), who married secondly Anne Reynolds
- Sir Thomas Burton, 2nd Baronet (1618–1659)
- Sir Thomas Burton, 3rd Baronet (1657–1705)
- Sir Charles Burton, 4th Baronet (1688–1750)

== Burton baronets, of Pollacton (1758) ==
Escutcheon of the Burton baronets of Pollacton

- Sir Charles Burton, 1st Baronet (1702–1775)
- Sir Charles Burton, 2nd Baronet (died 1812)
- Sir Charles Burton, 3rd Baronet (1779–1830)
- Sir Charles Burton, 4th Baronet (died 1842)
- Sir Charles William Cuffe Burton, 5th Baronet (1823–1902)
