= William Story (cricketer) =

English cricketer and British Army officer

Colonel William Frederick Story, CB (3 April 1852 – 1 December 1939) was a British Army officer and an English first-class cricketer active 1878–83 who played for Nottinghamshire. He was born in Stockport; died in Marylebone.

Story was an officer in the 3rd (Militia) battalion of the Highland Light Infantry, and was appointed lieutenant-colonel in command of the battalion on 24 October 1888. He later received the honorary rank of colonel. Following heavy British losses in the early part of the Second Boer War in 1899, many of the militia battalions were embodied for active service, including the 3rd battalion, Highland Light, with Story in command. The battalion served throughout the war, and return home on the SS Doune Castle in September 1902, after the war had ended earlier that year.

Story was a president of the Notts County Cricket Club and a racehorse owner. He was a Justice of the Peace, and a Deputy Lieutenant for Nottinghamshire from 27 April 1937.
