= Quorn Hall =

Country house in Leicestershire, England

Coordinates: 52.7478°N 1.1605°W

Quorn Hall is a grade II listed country house in the village of Quorn, Leicestershire. It is a three-storey brick built house originally constructed circa 1680 but later much modified. It is situated on the east side of the village of Quorn in 12 acres of land through which runs the River Soar.

== History ==
Quorn Hall was originally built by John Farnham on land he had acquired by the River Soar in the middle of the 15th century and was originally known as "Nether Hall". Arbella Stuart stayed with the Farnhams for a night during her journey to London in September 1609.

Much of the land was subsequently sold until the estate passed out of the hands of the Farnham family in 1686. In 1773 the estate was bought by Hugo Meynell, who transferred the pack of foxhounds he already owned to Nether Hall. He renamed the hall as Quorn Hall and the pack of foxhounds as the Quorn Hunt. The hall and its hounds subsequently passed through the ownership of several wealthy men until 1855, when it was bought by Sir Richard Sutton, who lived in the hall but rented out the stables and kennels. In 1906 the hunt left the Hall for newer premises in nearby Barrow upon Soar. After a short spell as a country club the hall was requisitioned during World War II for training naval personnel. For this purpose the building was considerably enlarged by extending a wing and adding a storey.

It has been used since 1983 as an outdoor education centre by Leicestershire County Council. During 2012, the council considered its closure and sale and decided to close it at the end of that year. Elsewhere in Quorn is located Quorn House, also a former seat of the Farnham family and more recently owned by Rosemary Conley.

In April 2013, headteacher Christina Church who is related to the footballer John Terry as her cousin has decided to buy the property for her school. Church retired in 2020. Four more headteachers followed: Caroline Bell (2020–2021), Antonia Jackson (2021), Lee Matts (2021–2023), and Andy Cutts-McKay (2024-present). The school changed its name from Gryphon School to Quorn Hall School in 2023.
