= John de Lisle (cricketer) =

English businessman and cricketer

Personal information
- Full name: John Adrian Frederick March Phillipps de Lisle
- Born: 27 September 1891; Kensington, London, England
- Died: 4 November 1961 (aged 70); Stockerston Hall, Leicestershire, England
- Batting: Right-handed
- Role: Batsman/captain

Domestic team information
- Years: Team
- 1921–30: Leicestershire
- First-class debut: 8 June 1921 Leicestershire v Kent
- Last First-class: 29 August 1930 Leicestershire v Surrey

Career statistics
Competition	First-class
Matches	33
Runs scored	530
Batting average	11.52
100s/50s	–/2
Top score	88
Catches/stumpings	13/–
- Source: CricketArchive, 20 September 2013

John Adrian Frederick March Phillipps de Lisle (27 September 1891 – 4 November 1961) was an English businessman and a cricketer who played first-class cricket for Leicestershire and was captain of the team in the 1930 season. He also served as High Sheriff of Leicestershire. He was born in Kensington, London and died at his home, Stockerston Hall, near Uppingham, Rutland.

De Lisle was from a prominent Leicestershire family – his father was Edwin de Lisle, Member of Parliament for Loughborough from 1886 to 1892, and his grandfather was Ambrose Lisle March Phillipps de Lisle, a leading Catholic figure and the builder of Grace Dieu Manor. John de Lisle intended to make a military career in the cavalry but for financial reasons had to settle instead for a life in business in the jute trade in India, where he joined the Calcutta Scottish Regiment in the First World War. On a visit home to England in 1921 he made a single first-class appearance for Leicestershire in a County Championship match against Kent, and although Leicestershire lost the match de Lisle, with innings of 72 and 88, top-scored in both innings.

None of the rest of de Lisle's cricketing career lived up to the promise of this first appearance. In 1924, he reappeared for Leicestershire in two games but scored only seven runs in three innings. From 1925, he moved back to England and became a stockbroker with a firm working on the Birmingham Stock Exchange. In 1930, Leicestershire, short of a captain because of the unavailability of Eddie Dawson, appointed de Lisle as captain for the season. The move was not a success: although Leicestershire began the season well, performances fell away badly and de Lisle himself managed only 363 runs in 30 matches at an average of just 8.85, and with a top score of only 28. Wisden Cricketers' Almanack commented that de Lisle "possessed no special ability as a run-getter and, having only recently returned from India, lacked intimate knowledge of first-class cricket". Dawson returned as captain in 1931 and de Lisle did not play again.

De Lisle maintained his military activities: he was a member of the Leicestershire Yeomanry from 1926 until he joined the Home Guard in Warwickshire in 1940. Later he served as deputy lieutenant for Leicestershire and, in 1954, as High Sheriff.

De Lisle married Girl Guide executive Muriel Elizabeth Muriel Smythe Guinness (1892–1974) in 1924. They had four children: Alathea, Elizabeth, Everard and Julian.
