= Leighfield =

Civil parish in Rutland, England

Coordinates: 52.613°N 0.772°W

- Location within Rutland
- Area: 3.68 sq mi (9.5 km^{2})
- Population: 10 2001 Census
  - Density: 3/sq mi (1.2/km^{2})
- OS grid reference: SK832024
  - London: 82 miles (132 km) SSE
- Unitary authority: Rutland
- Shire county: Rutland
- Ceremonial county: Rutland
- Region: East Midlands
- Country: England
- Sovereign state: United Kingdom
- Post town: OAKHAM
- Postcode district: LE15
- Dialling code: 01572
- Police: Leicestershire
- Fire: Leicestershire
- Ambulance: East Midlands
- UK Parliament: Rutland and Stamford

Leighfield is a civil parish in the county of Rutland in the East Midlands of England. There is no settlement centre in the parish, only a few isolated properties. In the 2001 census it had a population of 10, which was the fourth smallest of Rutland's parish populations. At the 2011 census the population remained less than 100 and was included in the civil parish of Ridlington. It shares its name with Leighfield Forest, a much larger area from Braunston-in-Rutland to Stockerston and from Skeffington to Ridlington, a triangle of land roughly 4 miles (6.4 km) in each direction.

The village's name means 'Wood/clearing'. Spellings with the addition of the Old English word 'feld' meaning 'open land' started to appear from the 14th century.

The Leighfield Way is a 7.4 miles (11.9 km) waymarked route joining the Leicestershire and Rutland Rounds at Belton-in-Rutland with the Hereward Way and Viking Way at Oakham.

== Leighfield Forest ==
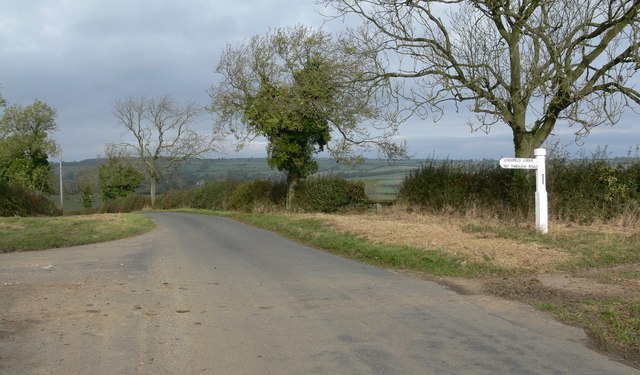
The lane to Leighfield Lodge

In the medieval period, Leighfield Forest was an extensive Royal forest straddling the borders of Rutland and Leicestershire. It included large numbers of sizeable wooded areas, which would mostly have been individually enclosed. The Forest also included roads, villages and farmland so was not ideal for Forest administration. It had been created soon after Henry I became king in 1100 and it was initially known as the Forest of Rutland (although a significant portion was in Leicestershire). Sauvey Castle, near Withcote, was probably built by King John in 1211 as a secluded hunting lodge. In 1235 all the Leicestershire sections were released from Forest Law, and in 1299 an eastern section was similarly disafforested.

Abuses by the Royal Officers would seem to have been at least as big a problem as poaching by the lower orders. One forester was found to be keeping 300 pigs in the woods. In 1269 the forester Peter de Neville was arraigned by the king's justices for taking for his own use timber, firewood and charcoal to the amount of 7,000 oaks and other trees. At least four deer parks were enclosed within the Forest, at Lyddington, Ridlington, Flitteriss Park and Cold Overton Park. Of these only Cold Overton still has ancient woodland. By the late 16th century, the Hastings family of Ashby de la Zouch were the Forest Wardens. It was by then known as Leighfield Forest, and was administered as three bailiwicks: Braunston, Ridlington and Beaumont. 33 individual woods are named in an inquisition of 1566, totalling 1060 acres.

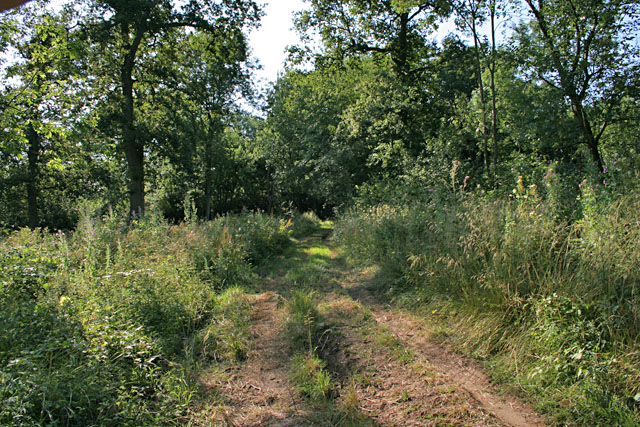
Skeffington Woods, remnant of Leighfield Forest

The end of the Forest came about in 1630 when Charles I removed the royal protection, and sold off his lands. It was rapidly given over to agriculture, whether pasture or tillage, and by 1700 nearly all the woodland has been cleared. The surviving ancient woodlands in the area include Prior's Coppice, Bolt Wood, Owston Woods, Skeffington Woods (listed as Leighfield Forest SSSI), Great Merrible Wood, the Launde woods, Wardley Wood and Stoke Dry Wood. The greater part of the former Forest, including Leighfield parish, is now an open landscape, although with species-rich hedgerows. Removal of many hedgerows during the 20th century has made the Leighfield woodlands increasingly isolated, but the Leicestershire and Rutland Wildlife Trust's 'Living Landscape' project has targeted Leighfield as one of its landscape-scale projects, and is working with the Forestry Commission to create new woodlands that can act as links between the ancient sites.

Several fragments have been designated a Site of Special Scientific Interest as Leighfield Forest SSSI.
