= Stockerston Hall =

18th-century English country house in Leicestershire

Coordinates: 52.5689°N 0.7718°W

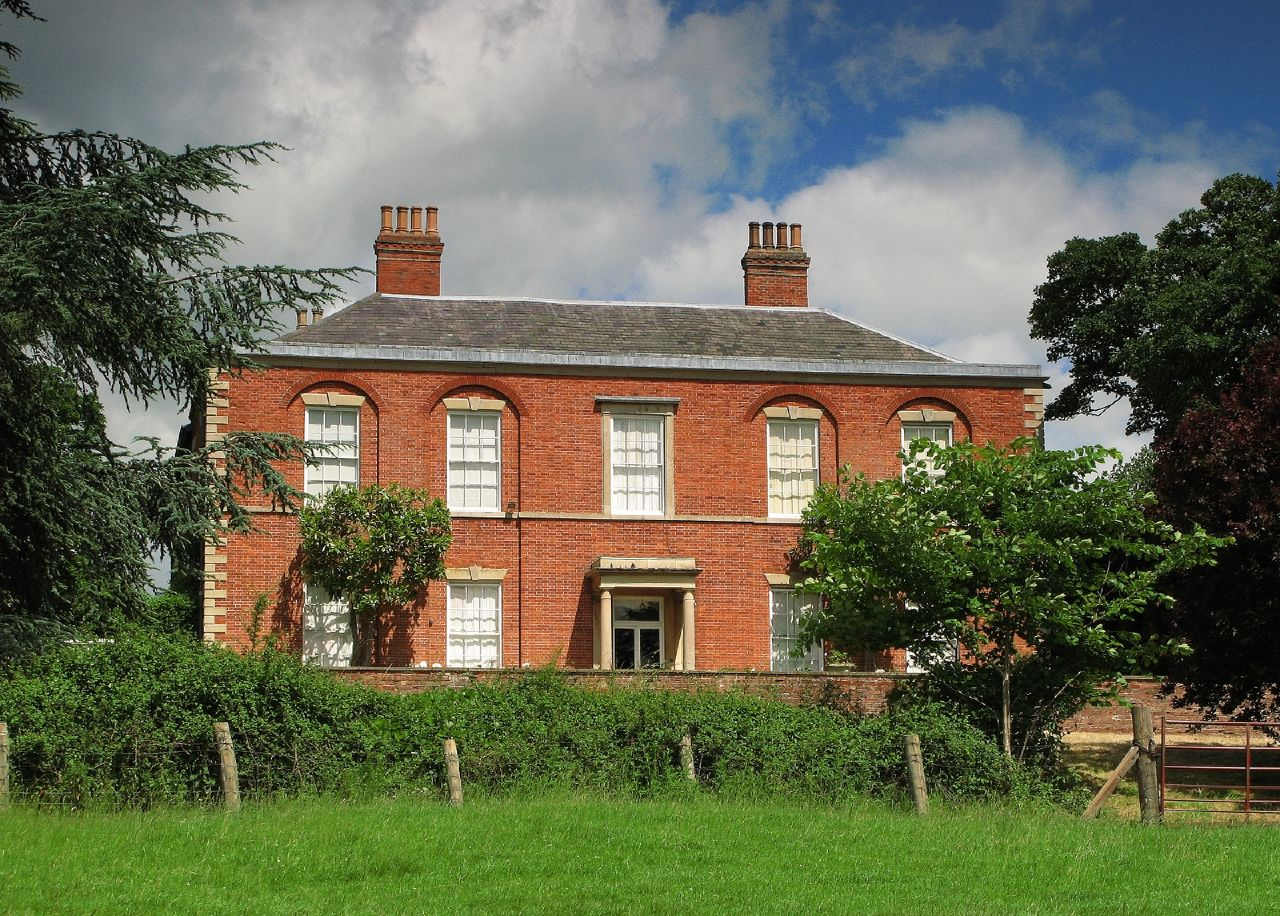
The Hall

Stockerston Hall is a late-18th-century English country house in Leicestershire, near the town of Uppingham, Rutland. It is a Grade II listed building.

The Manor of Stockerston was owned by the Boyville family in the 15th century and passed by marriage to Sothill and then to Drury. It was sold by Henry Drury in 1580 to John Burton of Braunston, whose son was the first of the Burton baronets of Stockerston. In 1633, Sir Thomas Burton Bt was High Sheriff of Leicestershire and in 1682 Sir Thomas Burton Bt had the same honour.

The Burtons were impoverished by the English Civil War and sold the estate to Sir Charles Dunscombe in about 1685. The Dunscombes demolished the old manor house in about 1797 and built the present Georgian style mansion upon its foundations in about 1800. The attractive red brick and stone dressed entrance front of five bays has a central Tuscan order porch.

The house was sold by Dunscombe in about 1807 and a number of owners and tenants followed including Walker, Bellairs, Fenwicke, Stevenson and from 1930 Whitgreave. By 1954 it was the residence of John A. F. March Phillipps de Lisle, High Sheriff of Leicestershire who was succeeded by his son Everard, also high sheriff in 1974. The house and 269-acre (1.09 km^{2}) estate were sold following the latter's death in 2003.
