= Hesilrige =

Surname, including notable people

Hesilrige is a surname. Notable people with the surname include:

- Thomas Hesilrige (disambiguation), multiple people
- Arthur Hesilrige (1601–1661), English politician

== See also ==
- Baron Hazlerigg
