= Arthur Hazlerigg =

Arthur Hazlerigg may refer to:

- Arthur Hazlerigg, 1st Baron Hazlerigg (1878–1949), British peer
- Arthur Hazlerigg, 2nd Baron Hazlerigg (1910–2002), British peer, cricketer, soldier and chartered surveyor

== See also ==
- Arthur Haselrig
