= London Lobsters =

English Civil War cavalry regiment

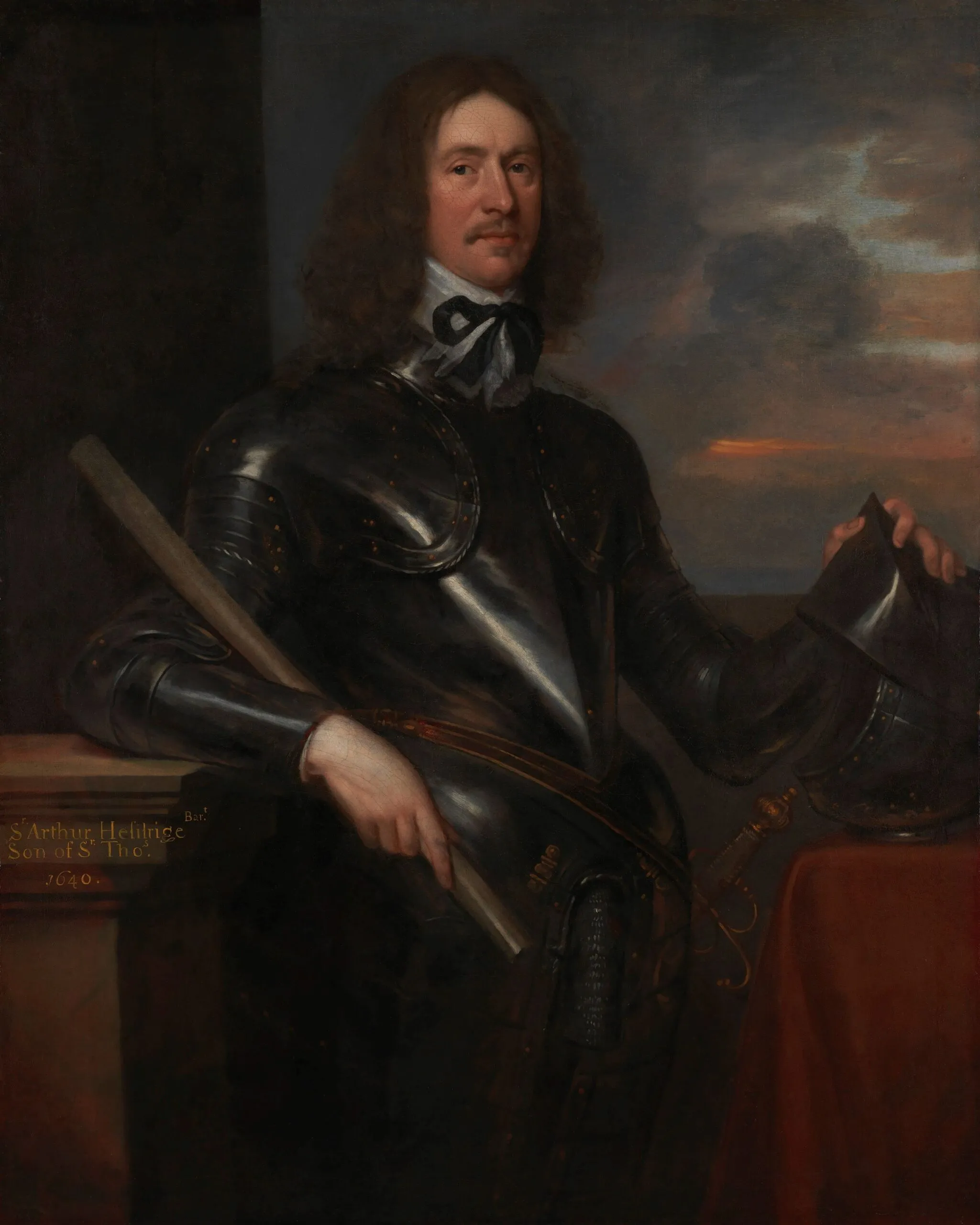
Sir Arthur Haselrig, who commanded the regiment

Sir Arthur Haselrig's Regiment of Horse, better known as the London Lobsters, (Note: also called "Haselrig's Lobsters" or just "Lobsters") was a Parliamentarian heavy cavalry regiment raised in 1642 and commanded by Colonel Sir Arthur Haselrig during the First English Civil War. One of two cuirassier units raised during the war, the regiment was equipped in suits of plate armour reaching from head to knee. It had a chequered career in combat, but was credited with being one of the few Parliamentarian cavalry units able to stand up to mounted charges by Cavalier horsemen during the war's early years. The regiment was re-equipped as harquebusiers in 1644 and absorbed into the New Model Army in April 1645, when Haselrig relinquished command to John Butler; as was then the custom it was renamed as John Butler's Regiment of Horse.

== Background ==
Sir Arthur Haselrig was a prominent leader of the Parliamentary opposition to Charles I during the 1630s. When the First English Civil War began in August 1642, he formed a regiment of "cuirassiers", who wore armour covering most of their body and became known as Haselrig's "London lobsters". They were one of only two similar units, since full armour had largely been abandoned at this time. Most cavalry wore only cuirasses and helmets, while equipping a cuirassier was very expensive. In 1629, cuirassier armour cost four pounds and 10 shillings, while that of harquebusiers (the standard cavalry of the time) was only one pound and six shillings. The only other unit entirely equipped in cuirassier armour was the Lifeguard of the Earl of Essex, however, individual cavalrymen within other regiments also served in complete armour.

== War service ==
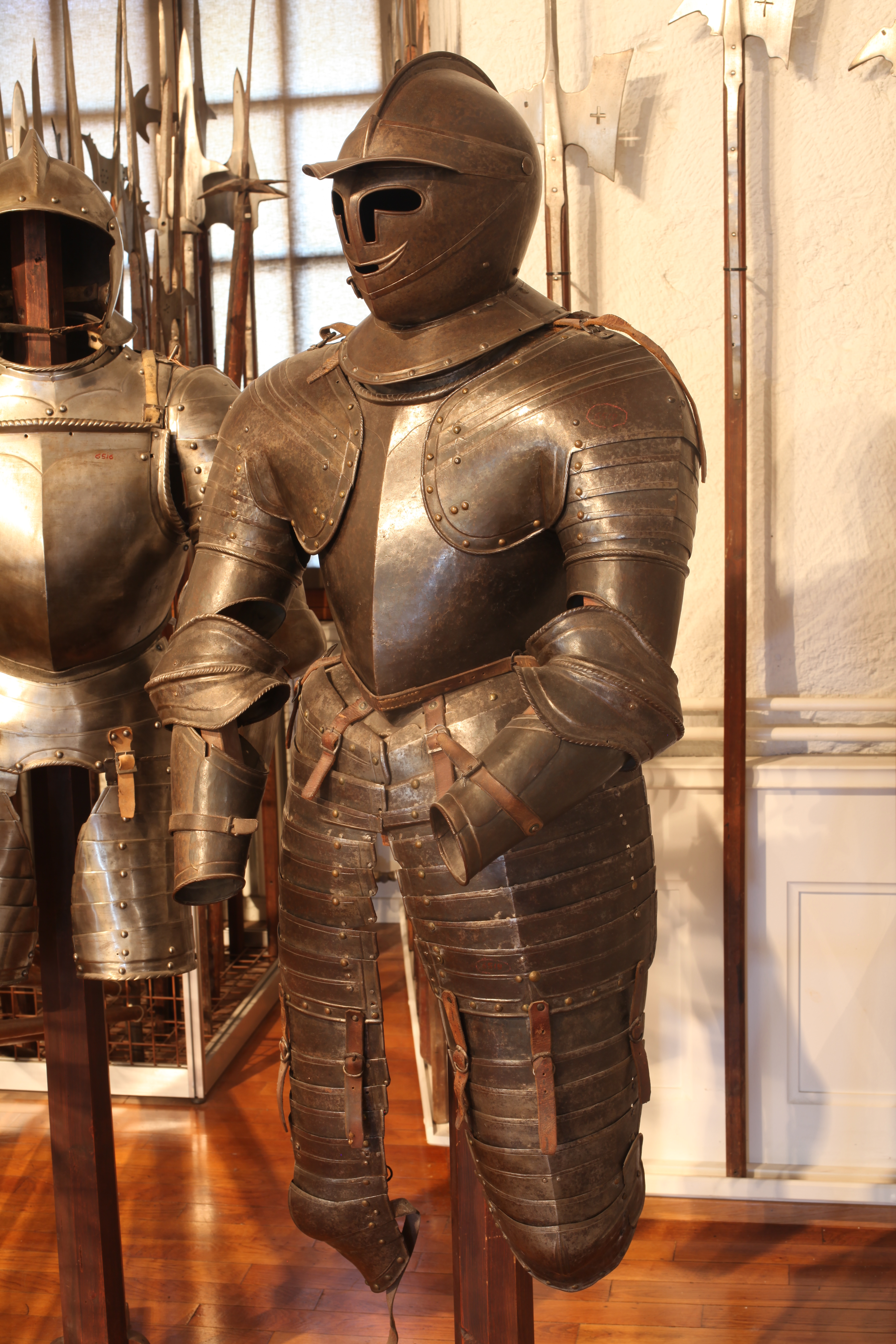
Armour of a 17th-century cuirassier, such as was worn by the Lobsters. The all-enclosing close helm (in this case in the "Savoyard" style) could have been replaced by a more open form, such as the lobster tailed pot.

The "lobsters" were probably the last unit to fight on English soil wearing full armour, and one of the last in Europe. They were credited with being "the first that made any impression upon the King's horse [the Royalist cavalry], who being unarmed [unarmoured], were not able to bear the shock with them; besides they were secure from hurts of the sword..."

Haselrig's regiment formed the heavy cavalry in the army of Sir William Waller.

=== Ripple Field ===
During the Battle of Ripple Field (13 April 1643), Prince Maurice's cavalry outflanked Parliament's troops, to the west of the hill. In an attempt to try and halt the now dangerous Royalist advance Sir Arthur Hesilrig charged with his curraisers, however, was swiftly forced back. The rest of Waller's forces routed.

On following the retreat of Wallace's forces, they suffered 70% casualties covering the Parliamentarian retreat.

=== Lansdowne ===
The "lobsters" then distinguished themselves at Lansdown on 5 July, as part of successful action of the general parliamentarian cavalry.

=== Roundway Down ===
At the Battle of Roundway Down, on 13 July, they met a Royalist cavalry charge at the halt, using the 'Dutch' tactic of receiving a charge by firing while stationary. After a brief clash they retreated in disorder, the Parliamentarian army losing the battle. Though they were defeated, the armour they wore apparently served them well; Haselrig was shot three times at Roundway Down, with the bullets bouncing off his armour. After firing a pistol at Haselrig's helmeted head at close range, without any effect, Richard Atkyns described how he attacked him with his sword, but it too caused no visible damage. Haselrig was under attack from a number of people and only succumbed when Atkyns attacked his unarmoured horse. After the death of his horse Haselrig tried to surrender; but as he fumbled with his sword, which was tied to his wrist, he was rescued. He suffered only minor wounds from his ordeal.

This incident was related to Charles I and elicited one of his rare attempts at humour. The King said that if Haselrig had been as well supplied as he was fortified he could have withstood a siege.

=== The Battle of Cheriton ===
At the Battle of Cheriton on 29 March 1644 the unit attacked a royalist regiment of infantry under Sir Henry Bard. Bard's unit had advanced towards the Parliamentary cavalry, but had moved too fast and were no longer in formation with the rest of the Royalist infantry. The Lobsters saw this and Haselrig led 300 of them against Bard's regiment. The royalist regiment was completely destroyed, with all the infantry either killed or taken prisoner. Parliament eventually won the battle.

== Standard or cornet ==
One of the cavalry standards, known in the 17th century as cornets, carried by the regiment is described as an anchor descending from the clouds on a green field, with the motto 'Only in Heaven'. This particular cornet belonged to Haselrig's own troop.

== Legacy ==
"Sir William Waller having received from London [in June 1643] a fresh regiment of five hundred horse, under the command of sir Arthur Haslerigge, which were so prodigiously armed that they were called by the other side the regiment of lobsters, because of their bright iron shells with which they were covered, being perfect curasseers."

== Sources ==
- Denton, Barry, Only in Heaven: The Life and Campaigns of Sir Arthur Hesilrige, 1601-1661, Bloomsbury, 1997. ISBN 978-1850756453.
- Haythornthwaite, Philip (1983). The English Civil War, An Illustrated History. Blandford Press. ISBN 1-85409-323-1.
- Clarendon, Edward Earl of, The history of the rebellion and civil wars in England, 1647 (reprinted 1839).
- Willis-Bund, John William (1905). The Civil War in Worcestershire, 1642-1646: And the Scotch Invasion of 1651. Birmingham: The Midland Education Company.
