= Arthur Hazlerigg, 1st Baron Hazlerigg =

British peer

Arthur Grey Hazlerigg, 1st Baron Hazlerigg (17 November 1878 – 25 May 1949), known as Sir Arthur Grey Hazlerigg, 13th Baronet, from 1890 to 1945, was a British peer.

Hazlerigg was the son of Lieutenant-Colonel Arthur Grey Hazlerigg, and Jane Edith Orr-Ewing, daughter of Sir Archibald Orr-Ewing, 1st Baronet. Sir Arthur Hesilrige, 2nd Baronet, was an ancestor. His father died when he was only one year old and in 1890, aged 11, he succeeded his grandfather as thirteenth Baronet, of Noseley Hall. He was educated at Eton and Trinity College, Cambridge. He played first-class cricket for Leicestershire from 1907 to 1910, captaining the county during that period. He made 65 appearances for the county. He later served as High Sheriff of Leicestershire in 1909 and as Lord Lieutenant of Leicestershire from 1925 to 1949. On 12 February 1945 he was raised to the peerage as Baron Hazlerigg, of Noseley in the County of Leicester, for his services to the county of Leicestershire.

Lord Hazlerigg married Dorothy Rachel Buxton, daughter of John Henry Buxton, in 1903. He died in May 1949, aged 70, and was succeeded in his titles by his son Arthur. Lady Hazlerigg died in 1972.

He stood for the Conservatives in 1906 but was unsuccessful.

General Election 1906: Melton Electorate 15,815
Party	Candidate	Votes	%	±%
Liberal	Henry de Rosenbach Walker	7,800	56.4	+8.2
Conservative	Arthur Grey Hazlerigg	6,033	43.6	−8.2
Majority		1,767	12.8	16.4
Turnout			87.5	+7.5
Liberal gain from Conservative		Swing	+8.2	

Honorary titles
Preceded by The Duke of Rutland	Lord Lieutenant of Leicestershire; 1925–1949	Succeeded by The Lord Cromwell
Peerage of the United Kingdom
New creation	Baron Hazlerigg; 1945–1949	Succeeded by Arthur Grey Hazlerigg
Baronetage of England
Preceded by Arthur Grey Hazlerigg	Baronet (of Noseley Hall); 1890–1949	Succeeded by Arthur Grey Hazlerigg
