= Arthur Hazlerigg, 2nd Baron Hazlerigg =

British peer, cricketer, soldier and chartered surveyor

Arthur Grey Hazlerigg, 2nd Baron Hazlerigg, MC, TD (24 February 1910 – 30 September 2002), was a British peer, cricketer, soldier and chartered surveyor.

Hazlerigg was the son of Arthur Grey Hazlerigg, 1st Baron Hazlerigg, and Dorothy Rachel Buxton. Sir Arthur Hesilrige, 2nd Baronet, was an ancestor. He was educated at Eton College and Trinity College, Cambridge. A successful cricketer in his youth, he captained the Leicestershire County Cricket Club in the 1930s. Hazlerigg served in North Africa, Syria, Palestine and Italy during the Second World War, achieving the rank of Colonel and being awarded the Military Cross. After the war he qualified as a chartered surveyor. He was also a Justice of the Peace and Deputy Lieutenant of Leicestershire. In 1949 he succeeded his father as second Baron Hazlerigg and as fourteenth Baronet, of Noseley Hall.

Lord Hazlerigg married Patricia Pullar, daughter of John Pullar, on 19 September 1945. They had three children:

- Angela Christine Hazlerigg (born 1946)
- Arthur Grey Hazlerigg, 3rd Baron Hazlerigg (1951−2022)
- Priscilla Frances Hazlerigg (born 1952)

His wife died in 1972. Lord Hazlerigg survived her by 30 years and died in September 2002, aged 92. He was succeeded in his titles by his only son Arthur.

Peerage of the United Kingdom
Preceded by Arthur Hazlerigg	Baron Hazlerigg; 1949–2002	Succeeded by Arthur Hazlerigg
