= Charles Bard, 2nd Viscount Bellomont =

Charles Rupert Bard, 2nd Viscount Bellomont (1647–1667) was the only son of Henry Bard. He was killed in action whilst serving in the Barbados Regiment, during the battle to recapture St Kitts from the French in 1667.

On his death all his titles fell extinct.

Peerage of Ireland
Preceded by Henry Bard	Viscount Bellomont; 1656–1667	Extinct
