= Henry Percy, Baron Percy of Alnwick =

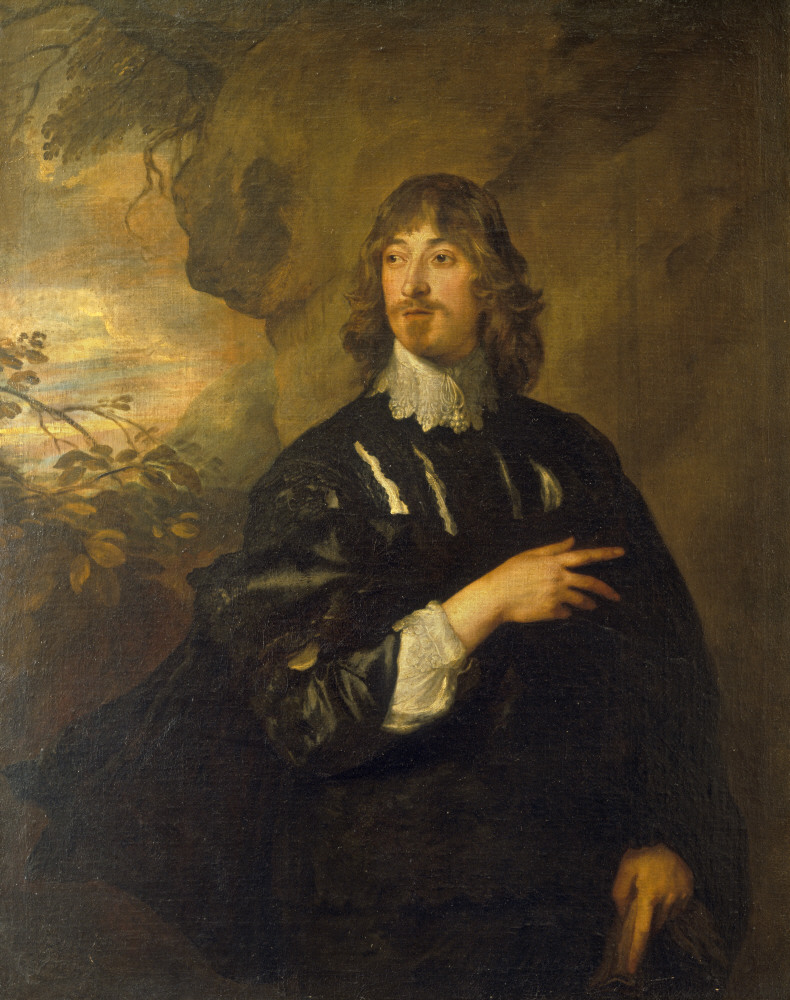
- Henry Percy by Anthony van Dyck
- Died: 1659; France
- Military career
- Allegiance: Royalist
- Rank: General of the Ordinance
- Conflicts: Battle of Cropredy Bridge

Henry Percy, Baron Percy of Alnwick (died 1659), son of Henry Percy, 9th Earl of Northumberland, sat in the Short Parliament as the member for Portsmouth, and in the Long Parliament an M.P. for Northumberland. He was an originator of the "first army plot" in 1641, after which he retired to France. He was appointed general of the ordnance of the king's army and created baron, 1643; but fell in disgrace in 1644 through his desire for peace. In 1648 he resigned his command and went to France where he joined Queen Henrietta Maria's party. He died in France around March 1659.

== Biography ==
Henry Percy, the younger son of Henry Percy, 9th Earl of Northumberland, was educated at a school at Isleworth, under Mr. Willis, and subscribed at Christ Church, Oxford on 7 December 1624. In 1628 he was elected member of parliament for Marlborough and sat until 1629 when King Charles decided to rule without parliament for eleven years. On 21 March 1631 he unsuccessfully applied for the post of secretary to the chancellor of the exchequer. Stratford designed to appoint him captain of a company in the Irish army, but the influence exerted for Lorenzo Cary frustrated the intention. As a courtier Percy was more fortunate; he obtained great influence with Queen Henrietta Maria, and employed it to further the interests of his brother, the Earl of Northumberland, and his brother-in-law, the Earl of Leicester. In March 1633 Percy acted as Lord Weston's friend in the quarrel between him and the Earl of Holland. His favour, however, continued to increase; in November 1639 he was appointed master of the horse to the Prince of Wales, and on 6 June 1640 he was appointed captain and governor of Jersey for life.

In April 1640, Percy was elected MP for Portsmouth in the Short Parliament. He was elected MP for Northumberland for the Long Parliament in November 1640. Percy was one of the originators of what was termed the "First Army Plot" in March 1641, but according to his own story simply designed to procure a declaration from the army in support of the king's policy, and was innocent of the plan to bring it up to London in order to put force on the parliament. When the plot was discovered he endeavoured to flee to France, but was set upon and wounded by the country people in Sussex, and remained for some time in hiding. To facilitate his own escape, he was induced to write a letter to his brother, giving an account of the conspiracy, which furnished the popular leaders with conclusive proof of the reality of the design, and was held by the Royalists to be a treacherous betrayal of his duty to the King. The sole punishment inflicted upon him for his share in the plot was his expulsion from the House of Commons, which took place on 9 December 1641.

Percy went to France, but at the outbreak of the war made himself useful to Queen Henrietta Maria, who employed him as an agent to King Charles, and obtained his restoration to favour. "Truly", she wrote, "I think him very faithful, and that we may trust him". Thanks to her support, he became on 22 May 1643 general of the ordnance in the king's army, and was created on 28 June of the same year Baron Percy of Alnwick.

Percy fought at the Battle of Cropredy Bridge on 29 June 1644, and accompanied the king into Cornwall in his pursuit of the Earl of Essex; but, having taken part in Henry Wilmot's intrigue to force the king to make peace, he fell into disgrace, and was obliged to resign his command. "His removal" says Clarendon, "added to the ill-humour of the army; for though he was generally unloved as a proud and supercilious person, yet he had always three or four persons of good credit and reputation, who were esteemed by him, with whom he lived very well; and though he did not draw the good fellows to him by drinking, yet he eat well, which in the general scarcity of that time drew many votaries to him, who bore very ill the want of his table, and so Avere not without some inclination to murmur even on his behalf." On 11 January 1645 Percy and two other Royalist peers were placed under arrest by the King on the charge of holding correspondence with his enemies and uttering disrespectful speeches, but in reality on account of the persistency with which they urged him to open negotiations with Parliament. Percy was released a few weeks later, and, having procured a pass from Essex, sought to take ship for the continent. On his way he was taken prisoner by William Waller and Oliver Cromwell at Andover. Among Percy's party "there was a youth of so fair a countenance that Cromwell doubted of his condition, and, to confirm himself, willed him to sing, which he did with such a daintiness that Cromwell scrupled not to say to Lord Percy that being a warrior he did wisely to be accompanied by Amazons, on which that lord in some confusion did acknowledge that she was a damsel; this afterwards gave cause for scoff at the king's party". Percy arrived at Paris at the end of March 1645, and, though the King had cautioned the Queen not to trust him too much, was speedily as great a favourite with Henrietta as before. In March 1648 he was wounded in a duel with Prince Rupert, and in the following October was put under arrest for giving the lie to Lord Colepeper in the presence of the Prince of Wales.

As Percy belonged to the queen's party and to the faction of Secretary Robert Long, he is spoken of with great severity in the correspondence of Edward Hyde and Edward Nicholas. They regarded him as an atheist because he favoured Hobbes, and advised Charles II to comply with the demands of the Presbyterians or any other party which would undertake to restore his throne. When he was made Lord Chamberlain and admitted to the Privy Council, their disgust knew no bounds. Hyde, however, was subsequently reconciled to Percy, who brought about a meeting between the queen and the chancellor of the exchequer, and is praised in the History of the Rebellion for his economical administration of the king's household. When Percy thought of making his peace with the Protector, Hyde dissuaded him, and told him that few men were so fit to be about the king's person, or engaged in the counsels likely to carry him home.

Percy died unmarried at Paris in France in around March 1659.

== Notes ==
Parliament of England
Unknown	Member of Parliament for Portsmouth; 1640; With: The Earl of Lanark	Succeeded by George Goring; Edward Dowse
Preceded by Sir John Fenwick, Bt; Sir William Widdrington	Member of Parliament for Northumberland; 1640–1641; With: Sir William Widdrington	Succeeded by Sir William Widdrington; Sir John Fenwick, Bt
Peerage of England
New creation	Baron Percy of Alnwick; 1643–1659	Extinct
