= Sir Henry Bard's regiment of Foote =

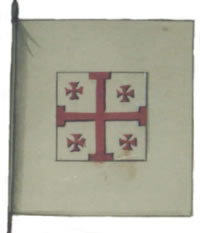
Ensign of Bard's Regiment

== A brief history ==
Sir Henry Bard's Regiment of Foote was a northern unit, originally called Colonel Thomas Pinchbeck's Regiment of Foote. Raised in Northumberland. It arrived in Oxford in May 1643 under the command of Colonel Thomas Pinchbeck. Half of Pinchbeck's regiment was split from the regiment under Bard's command to form Lord Percy's Foote. Pinchbeck was killed at the first battle of Newbury, and Bard took control of Pinchbeck's half of the regiment, hence the name change. The regiment's first major conflict under its new commanding officer was at Cheriton Wood. It was a disaster; records suggest that a week later the regiment numbered 176 men. The regiment later fought at the battles of Cropredy Bridge, Lostwithiel and Second Newbury, before being reinforced by the Queen's Lifeguard and forming the garrison of Campden House.

It is possible that they may also at this time have become an all musketeer unit, as was normal with garrisons and firelock muskets were certainly issued. Originally they wore grey or white coats but it is possible that red coats may have been issued at this time. The unit was finally destroyed at the Battle of Naseby; all of its colours were captured.

== As part of the Sealed Knot ==
The present day regiment has two companies: Captain Errington's Companye, based mainly in Essex but also having members as far a field as Ipswich and Devon and The Major's Companye, based mainly around Basingstoke. The regiment consists of pike, musket, drums, ensigns, artillery and camp followers. There are also two cannons within the regiment: Donna and Lizzy B.
