= Viscount Bellomont =

Title in the Peerage of Ireland

Viscount Bellomont, in the County of Dublin, was a title in the Peerage of Ireland. It was created on 18 July 1645 for the Royalist soldier Sir Henry Bard, 1st Baronet. He had already been created a Baronet, of Staines in the County of Middlesex, in the Baronetage of England on 8 October 1644, and was made Baron Bard of Dromboy, in the County of Westmeath, at the same time as he was granted the viscountcy, also in the Peerage of Ireland. All three titles became extinct on the early death of his only son, the second Viscount, in 1667.

== Viscounts Bellomont (1645) ==
- Henry Bard, 1st Viscount Bellomont (c. 1616–1656)
- Charles Rupert Bard, 2nd Viscount Bellomont (c. 1647–1667)
