= Cheriton, Hampshire =

Village and civil parish in Winchester, Hampshire, England

Coordinates: 51.051903°N 1.168855°W

Cheriton
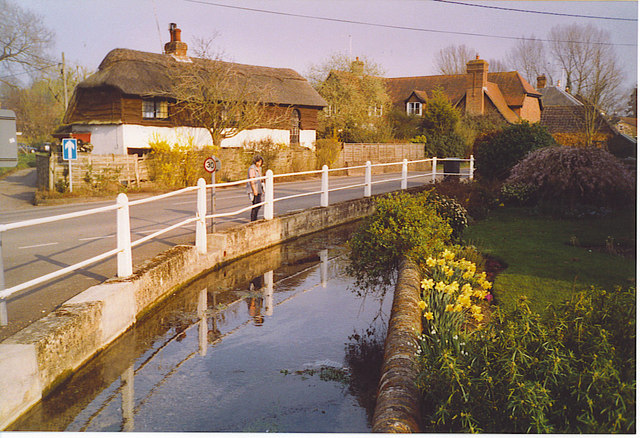
- View of the village centre and Itchen

- Location within Hampshire
- Population: 1,000
- OS grid reference: SU582284
- Civil parish: Cheriton
- District: City of Winchester
- Shire county: Hampshire
- Region: South East
- Country: England
- Sovereign state: United Kingdom
- Post town: ALRESFORD
- Postcode district: SO24
- Dialling code: 01962
- Police: Hampshire and Isle of Wight
- Fire: Hampshire and Isle of Wight
- Ambulance: South Central
- UK Parliament: Winchester

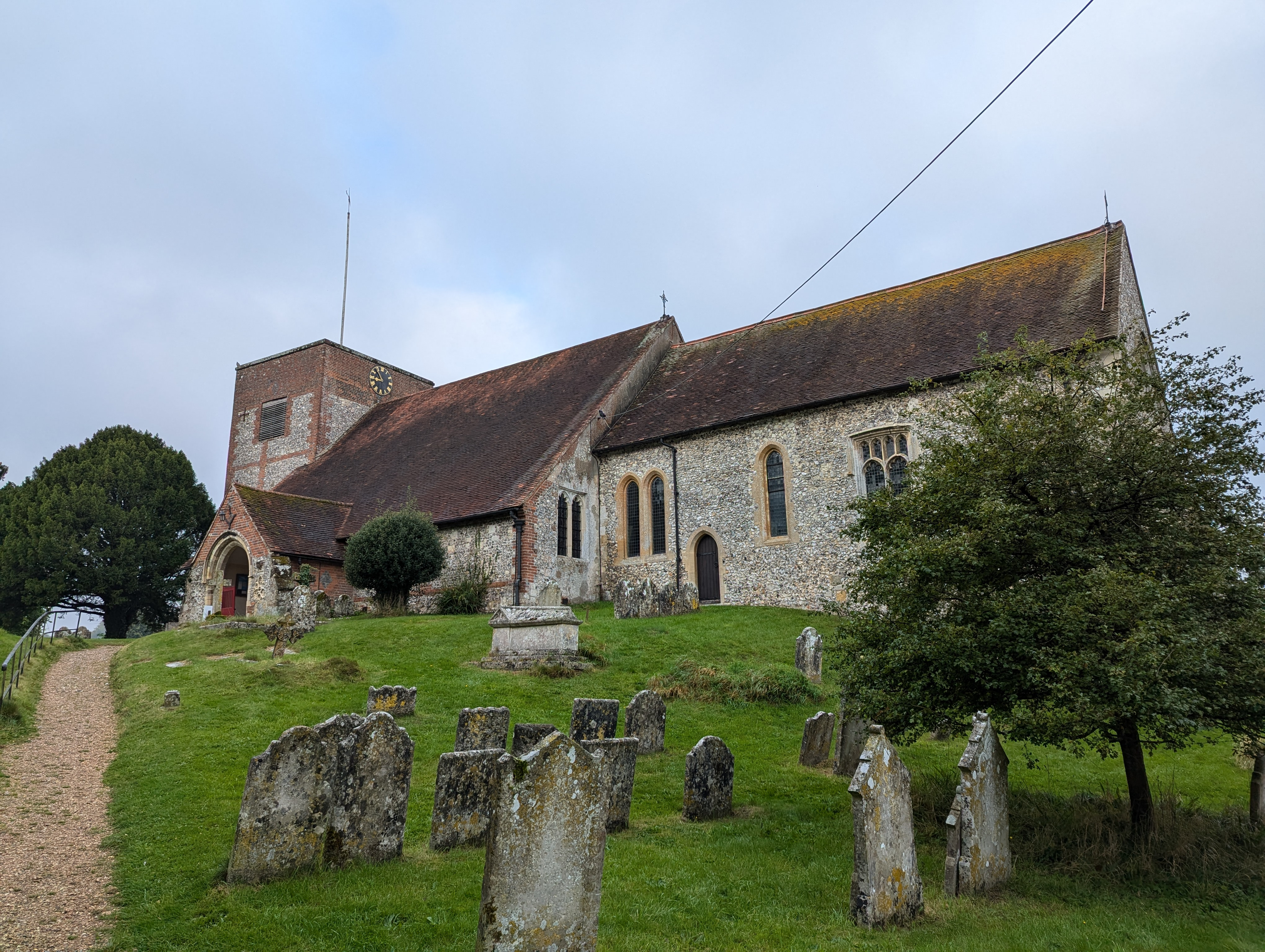
The church of St. Michael and all Angels at Cheriton in Hampshire, England. September 2024.

Cheriton is a village and civil parish near Alresford in Hampshire, England. The settlement is close to the site of the 1644 Battle of Cheriton, fought during the First English Civil War.

== Geography ==
Cheriton is two miles south of New Alresford and seven miles east of Winchester, and is served by the A272 road. The River Itchen flows through the village.

== Education ==
Cheriton Primary School is in the village, housed in a traditional Victorian school building.

== Facilities and services ==
Cheriton has two pubs, and a local shop that contains a sub-post office. The Flower Pots Inn has its own microbrewery, and has won numerous awards for brewing over the past twenty years as attested to by the certificates adorning its walls. The community also enjoys the village hall, tennis courts and cricket pitches which offer a quintessentially English country scene.

The Church of England parish church dates from the 13th century and is dedicated to St Michael and All Angels. The chancel was extended in the 15th century and the tower, porch and aisle walls were rebuilt following a fire in 1744. It is a Grade I listed building.

About 1 mile (1.6 km) to the east of the village is a monument to the Battle of Cheriton which was fought on 29 March 1644 and resulted in the defeat of the Royalist army.
