= Battle of Cheriton =

March 1644 Parliamentarian victory during the First English Civil War

- Part of the First English Civil War
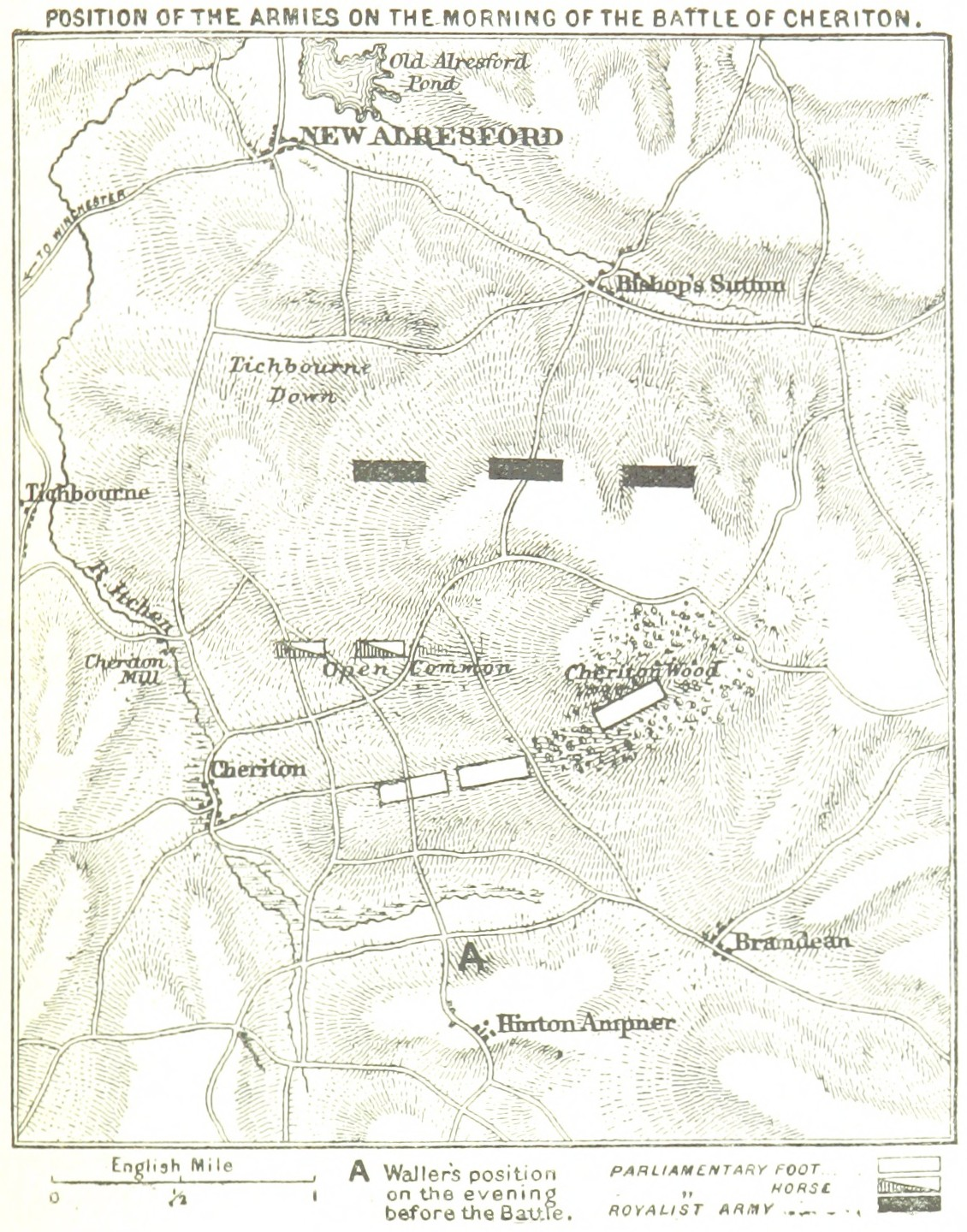
- Map of the battle morning by Edward Weller
| Date | 29 March 1644 |
| Location | Near Cheriton, Hampshire 51.059779°N 1.146612°W |
| Result | Parliamentarian victory |

Belligerents
| Royalists | Parliamentarians |

Commanders and leaders
| Earl of Forth; Lord Hopton | Sir William Waller; Sir Arthur Haselrig |

Strength
| 2,500 cavalry 3,500 infantry | 3,500 cavalry 6,500 infantry |

Casualties and losses
| 300 killed or wounded | 60 killed or wounded |

The Battle of Cheriton of 29 March 1644 was an important Parliamentarian victory during the First English Civil War. Sir William Waller's "Army of the Southern Association" defeated a Royalist force jointly commanded by the Earl of Forth and Sir Ralph Hopton. Defeat ended Royalist hopes of retaking South East England and forced them onto the defensive for the rest of 1644.

Although less well known than the Battle of Marston Moor, in his "History of the Rebellion" senior Royalist advisor Clarendon considered Cheriton an equally disastrous defeat.

== Background ==
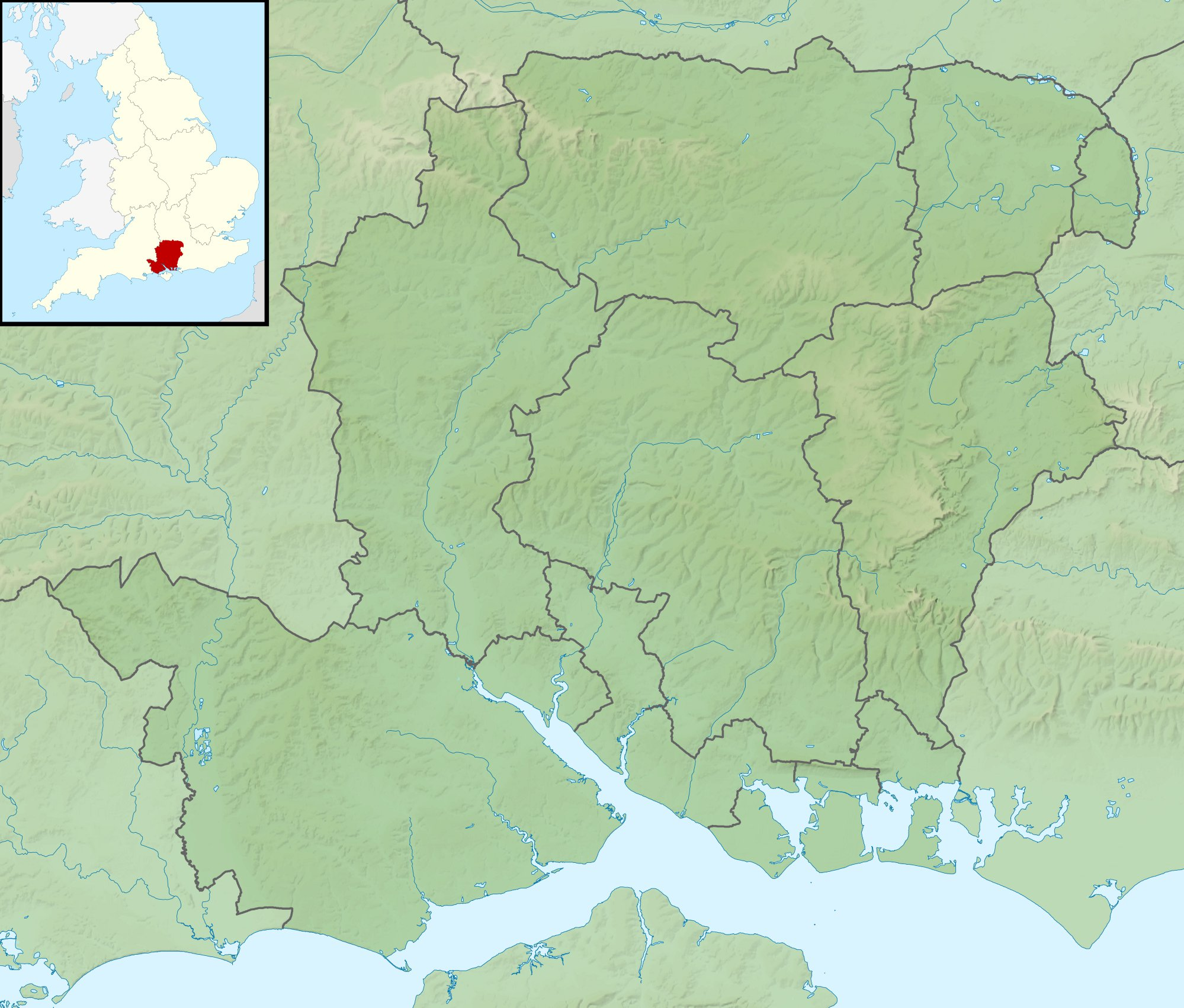
Cheriton campaign; key locations

In summer 1643, a Royalist army led by Lord Hopton invaded Hampshire and Sussex, whose Wealden iron industry was Parliament's main source of armaments. Despite initial success, by early January 1644 a series of defeats led Charles I to order a retreat into Wiltshire. When Hopton argued for remaining in Hampshire, Charles sent him a detachment from the Royalist field army in Oxford led by the Earl of Forth.

By the end of February, Sir William Waller's "Army of the Southern Association" based in Arundel had been increased to over 8,000. Parliament ordered him to slip past Hopton and retake South West England, lost to the Royalists after defeat at Roundway Down the previous summer. When one of his commanders, Sir Richard Grenville, deserted to Hopton in early March with this information, Forth and Hopton determined to seize New Alresford, placing themselves between Waller and London.

Advancing from their base at Winchester, they reached the town late on 27 March, just ahead of the Parliamentarian cavalry under Sir William Balfour. The next day they advanced cautiously south towards Cheriton; as night fell, a reconnaissance patrol under Sir George Lisle occupied an outpost near Cheriton Wood and reported the Parliamentarians were retreating.

== Battle ==
The Parliamentarians had been outmanoeuvred up to this point, and had indeed begun to retreat, but overnight Waller changed his mind and ordered an advance. As dawn broke, the City of London Brigade occupied Cheriton Wood. Hopton had moved to Lisle's outpost, and realised that it would have to be hastily withdrawn. The Royalists retreated to a ridge north of the wood, as Waller advanced.

Hopton was determined to recapture Cheriton Wood, and sent forward 1,000 "commanded" musketeers under Colonel Appleyard, supported by a battery of guns. There was some hot fighting, but the Parliamentarians abandoned the wood. Forth and Hopton intended to stand on the defensive at this point, but an impetuous infantry commander, Sir Henry Bard, launched his regiment of foot against the Parliamentarian left wing horse. Bard's regiment was overwhelmed and destroyed by a charge from Sir Arthur Haselrig's heavily armoured London lobsters. The Royalist cavalry on the right wing tried to support him, but were forced to make disjointed attacks along narrow lanes and were defeated in turn.

Hopton sent the Royalist horse from the left wing under Sir Edward Stawell to make a better prepared attack, but they were also defeated. Haselrig now attacked the Royalist foot moving up in support, and drove them back. The Parliamentarians also attacked the Royalist left, which had been denuded of its horse, and regained Cheriton Wood. The Royalists fell back to their ridge, but Hopton and Forth realised they could not withstand another attack and as evening fell, they retreated to Basing House.

== Aftermath ==
Bard was wounded and captured, while other Royalist casualties included senior commanders Lord John Stewart, Sir John Smith, Sir Edward Stowell; and Henry Sandys, who died of his wounds on 6 April. Defeat ended Royalist plans of retaking Sussex and Kent and allowed the Parliamentarian armies of Essex and Waller to concentrate against Oxford. Sir Edward Walker, secretary of the Royalist War Council, later commented "defeat necessitated his Majesty to alter the scheme of his affairs and replace an offensive with defensive war".

After lengthy debate, it was decided to merge the remnants of Hopton's army into the Oxford army at a review held at Aldbourne during April 1644. The infantry was formed into a single brigade under Sir Bernard Astley, with the cavalry divided between Sir Humphrey Bennet and Lord Wilmot. Although they partially restored the situation later in 1644 by gaining victories at Cropredy Bridge and Lostwithiel, the Royalists never resumed their offensive in southern England. In his "History of the Rebellion", Royalist advisor Clarendon wrote defeat had a disastrous impact on their prospects.

== Archaeological research ==
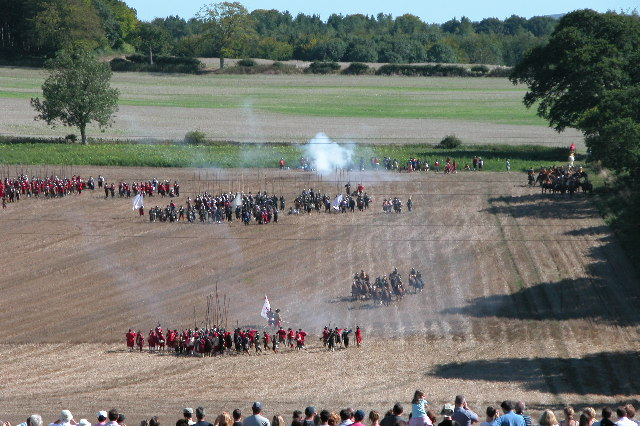
A historical reenactment of the battle

The study of the battlefield has been complicated by a metal detectorist falsifying their survey methods and poor storage of the recovered artefacts (mostly musket and pistol balls).

== Sources ==
- John Adair, Cheriton 1644: The Campaign and the Battle, Kineton: Roundwood, 1973, ISBN 0-900093-19-6.
- Barratt, John (2004). Cavalier Generals: Charles I and His Commanders during the English Civil War 1642-46. Pen and Sword. ISBN 9781473813038.
- Ede Borrett, Stephen (1999). "The Royalist Army at the Second Battle of Newbury; 27 October 1644". Journal of the Society for Army Historical Research. 77 (312): 240–249. JSTOR 44225806.
- Foard, G; Partida, T (2020). "Battle of Cheriton 29th March 1644". UK Battlefields Resource Center. The Battlefields Trust.
- Newman, P.R. (1998). Atlas of the English Civil War (Reprint - Reissue ed.). Psychology Press. ISBN 9780415196109.
- MacLean, Sir John; Heane, W.C., eds. (1885). The Visitation of Gloucestershire 1623. London.
- Royle, Trevor (2004). Civil War: The Wars of the Three Kingdoms 1638–1660 (2006 ed.). Abacus. ISBN 978-0-349-11564-1.
- Wedgwood, CV (1958). The King's War, 1641-1647 (2001 ed.). Penguin Classics. ISBN 978-0141390727.
