= Baron Hazlerigg =

Barony in the Peerage of the United Kingdom

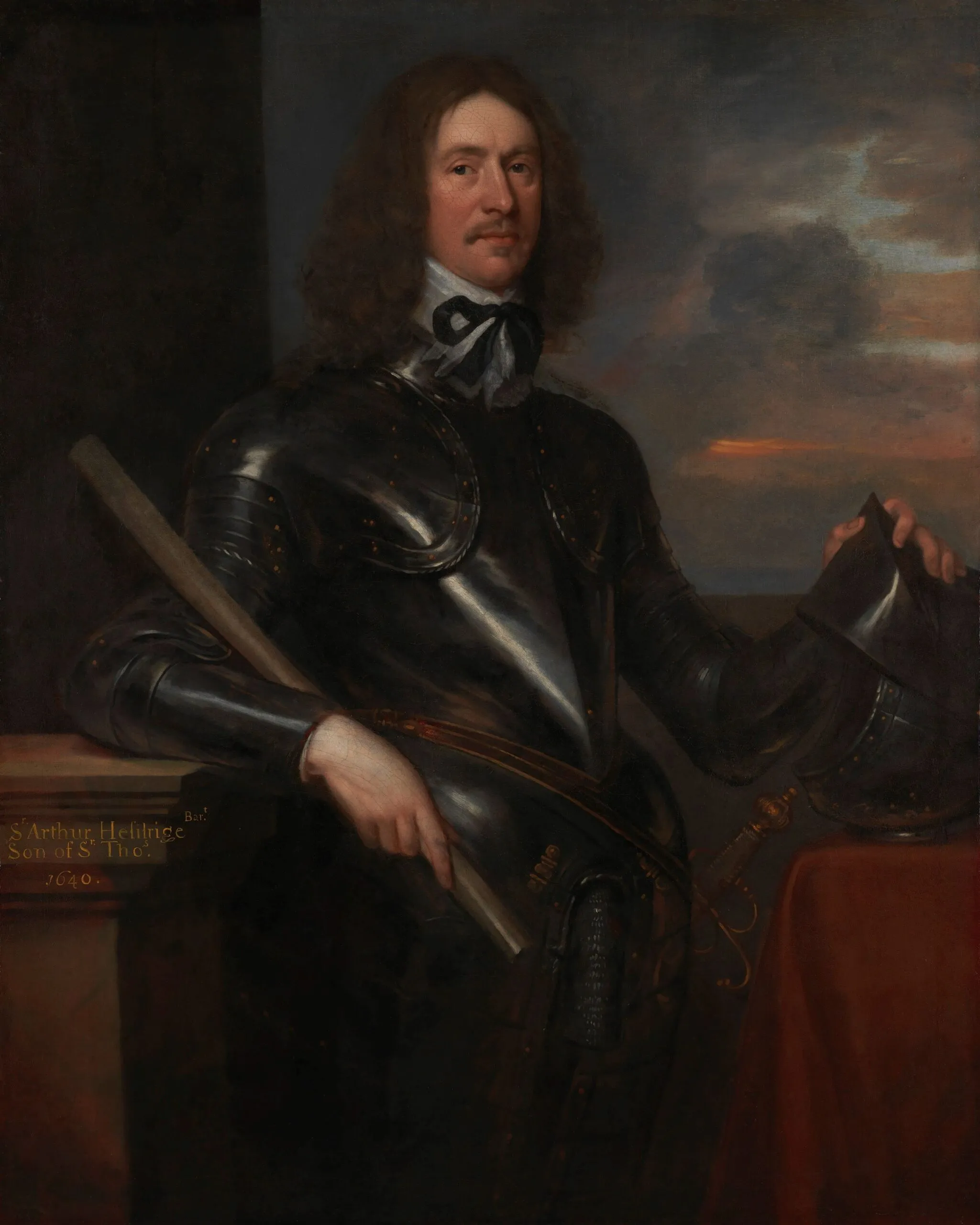
Sir Arthur Haselrig, 2nd Baronet

Baron Hazlerigg, of Noseley in the County of Leicester, is a title in the Peerage of the United Kingdom. It was created in 1945 for Sir Arthur Hazlerigg, 13th Baronet. He had previously served as Lord Lieutenant of Leicestershire. As of 2023 the title is held by his great-grandson, the fourth Baron, who succeeded his father in 2022.

The Hazlerigg baronetcy, of Noseley Hall in the County of Leicester, was created in the Baronetage of England in 1622 for Thomas Hesilrige. He notably represented Leicestershire in the House of Commons. He was succeeded by his son, the second Baronet, the most famous member of the family. He was one of the five members of Parliament whom King Charles I tried to have arrested in 1642, and was one of the most vocal advocates of parliamentary supremacy throughout the English Civil War and the Protectorate. His grandson, the fourth Baronet, also represented Leicestershire in Parliament. He was succeeded by his uncle, the fifth Baronet. The latter's great-great-grandson, the eleventh Baronet, assumed by Royal licence the surname of Hazlerigg in lieu of Hesilrige in 1818. His great-grandson was the thirteenth Baronet, who was elevated to the peerage in 1945.

As of 2023, the present holder of the barony has not successfully proven his succession to the baronetcy and is therefore not on the Official Roll of the Baronetage.

The family seat is Noseley Hall, near Noseley, Leicestershire.

== Hesilrige (later Hazlerigg) baronets, of Noseley Hall (1622) ==
- Sir Thomas Hesilrige, 1st Baronet (1564–1629)
- Sir Arthur Hesilrige, 2nd Baronet (d. 1661)
- Sir Thomas Heselrige, 3rd Baronet (c. 1625–1680)
- Sir Thomas Hesilrige, 4th Baronet (1664–1700)
- Sir Robert Hesilrige, 5th Baronet (c. 1640–1713)
- Sir Robert Hesilrige, 6th Baronet (d. 1721)
- Sir Arthur Heselrige, 7th Baronet (d. 1763)
- Sir Robert Heselrige, 8th Baronet (d. c. 1790)
- Sir Arthur Hesilrige, 9th Baronet (d. 1805)
- Sir Thomas Maynard Hesilrige, 10th Baronet (d. 1817)
- Sir Arthur Grey Hazlerigg, 11th Baronet (d. 1819)
- Sir Arthur Grey Hazlerigg, 12th Baronet (1812–1890)
- Sir Arthur Grey Hazlerigg, 13th Baronet (1878–1949) (created Baron Hazlerigg in 1945)

== Baron Hazlerigg (1945) ==
- Arthur Grey Hazlerigg, 1st Baron Hazlerigg (1878–1949)
- Arthur Grey Hazlerigg, 2nd Baron Hazlerigg (1910–2002)
- Arthur Grey Hazlerigg, 3rd Baron Hazlerigg (1951–2022)
- Arthur William Grey Hazlerigg, 4th Baron Hazlerigg (b. 1987)

The heir apparent is the present holder's son, the Hon. Arthur Ivor Grey Hazlerigg (b. 2020)
