= Thomas Hesilrige =

Thomas Hesilrige may refer to

- Sir Thomas Hesilrige, 1st Baronet (1564 - 1629), MP
- Sir Thomas Hesilrige, 4th Baronet (1664 - 1700), MP
