= Noseley =

Village in Leicestershire, England

Coordinates: 52.584°N 0.908°W

Noseley is a village and civil parish in the Harborough district of Leicestershire, England.

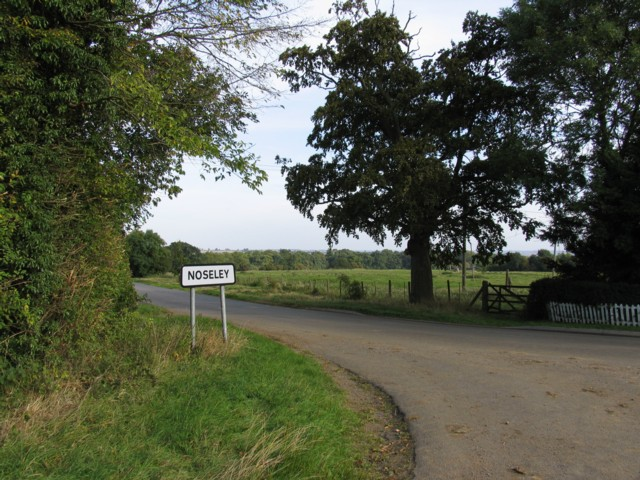
Approaching Noseley - geograph.org.uk - 238815

The civil parish population at the 2011 census was 204.

The name derives from the Old English NOTHWULF (male personal name) and LEAH (woodland clearing). It was recorded in the Domesday Book of 1086, at which time it had a population of 28. The village was gradually depopulated in the 16th century, due to enclosure and the conversion of the land to pastoral farming. By 1811, the population had dropped to just 2. In 2004 the parish had an estimated population of 40.

Noseley Hall was rebuilt in the early 18th century by Sir Robert Hazlerigg (d.1721); the Hazlerigg family have held the manor continuously since around 1435. The hall is a Grade II* listed building. Family members included the Parliamentarian, Sir Arthur Hesilrige, who was one of the five Members of Parliament whom Charles I unsuccessfully sought to arrest, one of the incidents which led up to the English Civil War.

The original church in Noseley fell into disrepair and by around 1549 had been demolished. The chapel at Noseley Hall is now used as a church.
