= Noseley Hall =

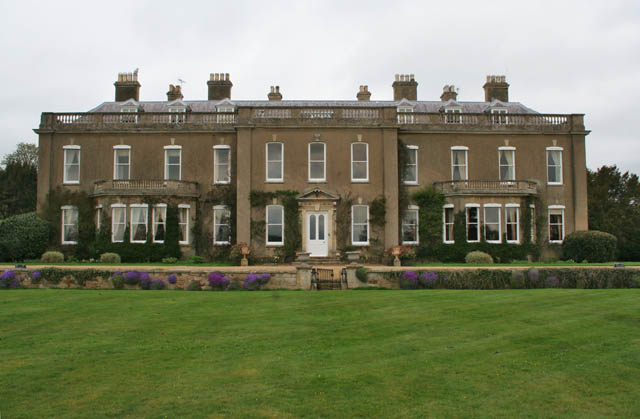
- Noseley Hall

- Location within Leicestershire
- 52°34′45″N 0°54′43″W
- Type: Country house

Listed Building – Grade II*
- Official name: Noseley Hall
- Designated: 9 October 1951
- Reference no.: 1360651

Listed Building – Grade I
- Official name: Noseley Chapel
- Designated: 29 December 1966
- Reference no.: 1360652

Listed Building – Grade II
- Official name: Stables at Noseley Hall
- Designated: 13 December 1984
- Reference no.: 1061689

Noseley Hall is a privately owned 18th-century country house situated at Noseley, Billesdon, Leicestershire. It is a Grade II* listed building.

Anciently held by the Marteval family, it has been the seat of the Hazlerigg family since 1419 when the Marteval heiress married Thomas Hasilrige (the spelling of the family name was changed in 1818).

The house was built in the 1720s by Sir Arthur Haselrige on the site of the previous 15th-century manor house, of which no trace remains. The imposing two-storey south front has attics behind balustrades and eleven bays symmetrical around the central three advanced bays, which are defined by full-height Tuscan style pilasters. The central doorway carries the family crest on the keystone and a pediment. Substantial alterations and extensions were carried out in about 1835.

The nearby 13th-century family chapel (52°34′45″N 0°54′46″W) is a Grade I listed building and the adjoining stable block is Grade II.

Many of the contents of the house were sold by auction in 1998 and realised over £2.6m. The house and estate were put on the market for sale in April 2009, and as of April 2011 the asking price was £12m.

The house, land and contents were sold to Robert Wilkinson, owner of Rolleston Hall, for £7.8 million in 2012 (taking control in 2014). Arthur Hazlerigg is at present employed by Robert Wilkinson in the capacity of Estate Manager of Noseley Estate.
