= Arthur Haselrig =

English politician and military officer

Sir Arthur Haselrig Bt
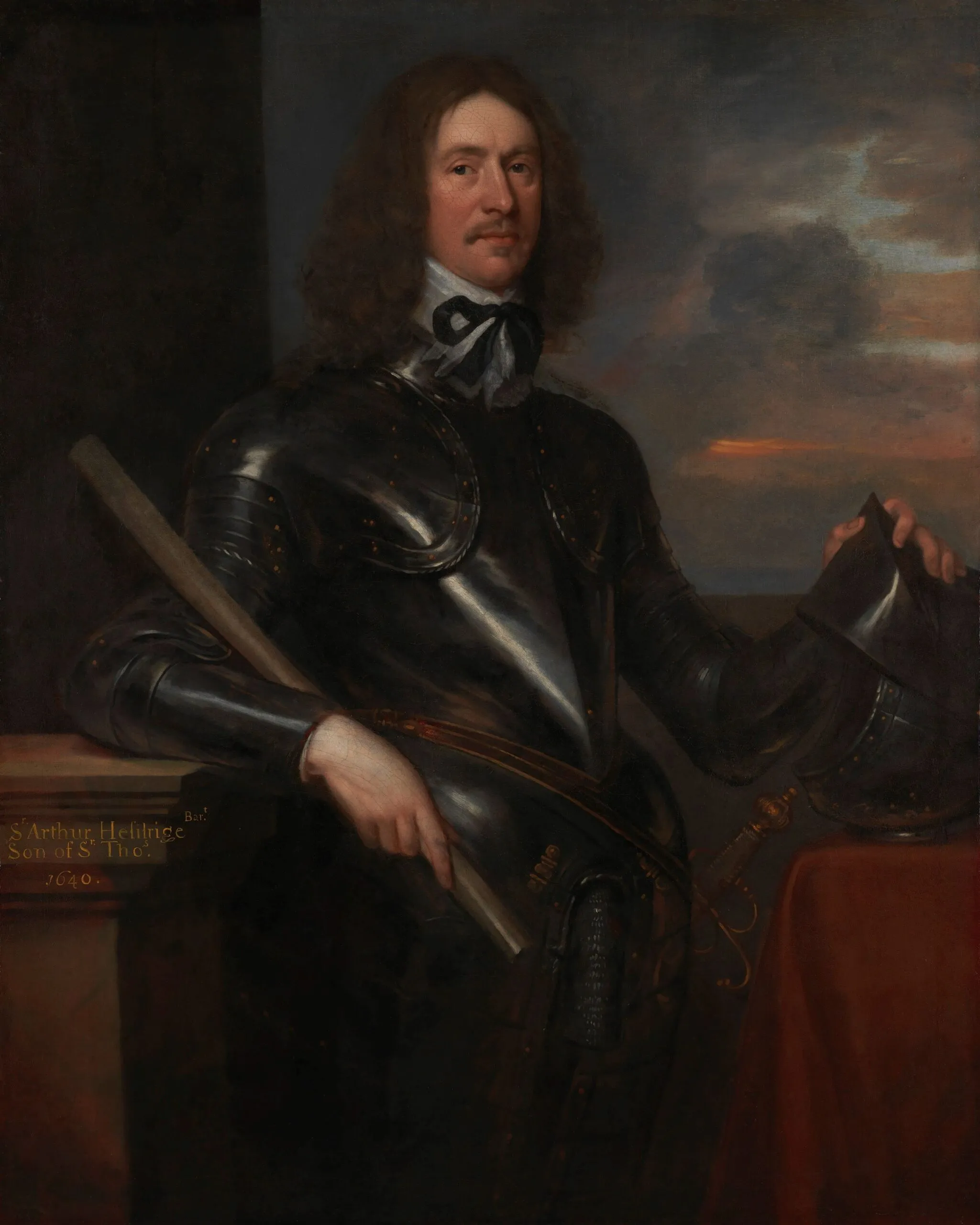
- 1640 portrait

Member of the English Council of State
- In office May 1659 – October 1659

Lord President of the English Council of State
- In office January 1652 – February 1652

MP for Leicester
- In office 1653 – 1659 (banned from sitting 1655–1658)

Governor of Newcastle
- In office December 1647 – 1652

MP for Leicestershire
- In office 1640–1653

Personal details
- Born: ca 1601 Noseley Hall Leicestershire
- Died: 7 January 1661 (aged 60) Tower of London
- Spouse(s): (1) Frances (1624–1632) (2) Dorothy (1634–1650)
- Children: (1) Thomas (1625–1680) (2) Katherine (1635–1670) and Robert (1640–1713)
- Parent(s): Sir Thomas Hesilrige (died 1632); Frances Gorges
- Education: Magdalene College, Cambridge

Military service
- Battles/wars: First English Civil War; Battle of Edgehill; Battle of Lansdowne; Battle of Roundway Down; Battle of Cheriton; Second Newbury

Sir Arthur Haselrig, 2nd Baronet (Note: Alternative spellings include "Heselrig", or "Haselrigge") (1601 – 7 January 1661) was an English politician and military officer. A major critic of Charles I of England during the period of Personal Rule from 1629 to 1640, he was one of the Five Members whose attempted arrest sparked the First English Civil War in August 1642. As a leading Parliamentarian, he held various military and political posts during the Wars of the Three Kingdoms.

Haselrig approved the execution of Charles I in January 1649, although he refused to participate in his trial, but later opposed Oliver Cromwell's creation of The Protectorate in 1653. In the political struggle which ended with the Stuart Restoration in May 1660, he sought to prevent the return of Charles II of England. Viewed as an opponent of the new regime, he was arrested and held in the Tower of London, where he died on 7 January 1661.

== Personal details ==
Descended from Leicestershire landed gentry, Haselrig was the eldest son of Sir Thomas Hesilrige, 1st Baronet of Noseley Hall, Leicestershire, and of Frances Gorges, daughter of Sir William Gorges, of Alderton, Northamptonshire.

Haselrig married firstly Frances Elmes, daughter of Thomas Elmes of Lilford Hall, Northamptonshire, by whom he had two sons and two daughters. He married secondly Dorothy Greville, sister of Robert Greville, 2nd Baron Brooke, by whom he had three sons and five daughters.

== Short and Long Parliaments ==
In April 1640, Haselrig was elected Member of Parliament for Leicestershire in the Short Parliament He was re-elected MP for Leicestershire for the Long Parliament in November 1640. He was heavily involved in the Act of Attainder against Thomas Wentworth, Earl of Strafford, the Root and Branch Bill and the Militia Bill of 7 December 1641. Charles I tried to arrest him for treason on 3 January 1642, along with John Hampden, Denzil Holles, John Pym and William Strode. However the so-called "Five Members", together with the peer Edward Montagu, 2nd Earl of Manchester who was also due to be arrested, were tipped off by Robert Devereux, 3rd Earl of Essex. The king marched with his guards into the House of Commons chamber only to find that the Five Members had fled.

== Civil War ==
Haselrig was very active in the First English Civil War on the Parliamentarian side. He raised a troop of horse for the Earl of Essex and fought at the Battle of Edgehill. He was a commander in the West under William Waller, being nicknamed his fidus Achates, and led his cuirassiers, who were known as the London lobsters. He and his troops distinguished themselves at the Battle of Lansdowne on 5 July 1643, where his men defeated Sir Beville Grenville's Pikemen, although the battle is traditionally seen as indecisive. At the Battle of Roundway Down, on 13 July, Haselrig's force met a Royalist cavalry charge at the halt and after a brief clash, retreated in disorder, the Parliamentarian army losing the battle to Lord Wilmot. Haselrig was shot three times at Roundway Down, with the bullets apparently bouncing off his armour. After firing a pistol at Haselrig's helmeted head at close range without any effect Richard Atkyns described how he attacked him with his sword, but it too caused no visible damage; Haselrig was under attack from several people and succumbed only when Atkyns attacked his unarmoured horse. After the death of his horse Haselrig tried to surrender, but as he fumbled with his sword, which was tied to his wrist, he was rescued. He suffered only minor wounds from his ordeal. This incident was related to Charles I and elicited one of his rare attempts at humour. The king said that if Haselrig had been as well supplied as he was fortified he could have withstood a siege.

At the Battle of Cheriton, his men defeated Sir Henry Bard's cavalry charge, seriously weakening Ralph Hopton's army in the west. This battle was a turning point in the war and the king's secretary Sir Edward Walker said that after Cheriton, instead of an offensive war they were forced to make a defensive war.

== Governor of Newcastle ==
Haselrig supported Oliver Cromwell in his dispute with the Earl of Manchester and the Earl of Essex. When the Self-denying Ordinance was approved by Parliament he gave up his commission and became one of the leaders of the Independent party in Parliament. On 30 December 1647 he was appointed governor of Newcastle upon Tyne, which he successfully defended, besides defeating the Royalists on 2 July 1648 and regaining Tynemouth. In October he accompanied Cromwell to Scotland, and gave him valuable support in the Scottish expedition in 1650. Between 1647 and 1650 Haselrig and his son bought a large amount of property in the north east which included the manors of Bishop Auckland, Middleham, Easingwoodborough and Wolsingham at a total cost of over £22,500.

== Parliamentary career under Cromwell ==
Haselrig approved of the king's execution but declined to act as a judge at his trial. He was one of the leading men in the Commonwealth, but he was antagonised by Cromwell's expulsion of the Rump Parliament, and he opposed the Protectorate refusing to pay taxes. Haselrig considered Cromwell to be a traitor to the cause after this as he was a staunch republican and opposed to all rule by a single person whether by hereditary succession or military might. Edmund Ludlow, one of his opponents admitted "to do him justice .. I must acknowledge that I am under no manner of doubt concerning the rectitude and sincerity of his intentions. For he made it his buseness to prevent arbitrary power wherever he knew it to be affected, and to keep the sword subserviant to the civil magistrate".

In 1654, Haselrig was elected MP for Leicester in the First Protectorate Parliament and in 1656 for the Second Protectorate Parliament, but he was excluded from them both. He refused a seat, offered to him by Cromwell, in the Protectorate House of Lords.

== Parliament against Lambert ==
On Cromwell's death Haselrig refused support to Richard Cromwell, and was instrumental in his downfall. He was elected MP for Leicester for the Third Protectorate Parliament in 1659. In April 1659, the army officers of the Wallingford House party acted to close down this parliament, and in May to restore the Rump Parliament, of which Haselrig was also a member, with government in the hands of the Council of State, appointed by the Rump. Haselrig became one of the most influential men in both Council and Parliament. He tried to keep a republican parliamentary administration, "to keep the sword subservient to the civil magistrate". He opposed the schemes of John Lambert who was resisting parliamentary control over the military. In one altercation Lambert complained that the army was being held at ransom; Haselrig replied that "You are only at the mercy of Parliament who are your friends" to which Lambert replied "I know not why they should not be at our mercy as well as we at theirs." Anger at the independence of the army resulted in nine leading officers, including Lambert, being cashiered. Lambert reacted by calling out the army and blocking all routes to Parliament, and putting guards upon its doors.

After Lambert had halted Parliament, Haselrig decided to restore Parliament. The strength of the army in London called for another location, and for a variety of reasons Portsmouth was chosen. Portsmouth had strong naval traditions and had always maintained independence from the army; it benefited from defensible fortifications on its land side and the support of Admiral John Lawson ensured that the city would not fall easily to a protracted siege. Haselrig knew the area well having campaigned around Hampshire during the civil war. The newly appointed Governor Nathaniel Whetham was a republican who had declared that his men would support him. Whetham was a friend of General George Monck in Scotland who had the best forces in Britain at his disposal and who had declared himself for Parliament in October. On 4 December 1659 Haselrig met with his allies in the Red Lion Inn having arrived at 4 in the afternoon. By the next day a declaration was posted calling for citizens to "restore Parliament to their former freedom, being the peoples indubitable and undoubted birthright". Hurst Castle and the Isle of Wight soon declared for Parliament. The military government, which was now named the Committee of Safety, despatched a force hoping that pro-army members would open the gates. However the Commander of the Army Colonel Nathaniel Rich entered into negotiations and his men decided to join Haselrig. Word soon spread and soon Hull and Plymouth were recorded to be going the same way. The army council, unsure of support of its troops, restored the Rump Parliament by 26 December. On 29 December Haselrig marched to London and attended Parliament still in his riding clothes. Haselrig was at the height of his power as the major figure in a restored republic and was appointed to the Council of State on 2 January 1660. On 11 February he became a commissioner for the army.

== Monck and the Restoration ==
However Monck had begun to march south from Coldstream on 1 January. Lambert moved to face Monck but knowing the strength of Monck's forces and the doubtful loyalty of his own troops avoided engagement. Monck avoided answering questions as to his intentions and by 3 February entered London. Haselrig, trusting to his assurance of fidelity to the "Good Old Cause" consented to the retirement of his regiment from London. The Rump Parliament was dissolved and Haselrig found himself marginalised by the unfolding events. A new Convention Parliament came in on 31 April and by 8 May Charles II was proclaimed King. Haselrig petitioned for a pardon, claiming he had not supported the overthrow of Charles I and had supported the Commonwealth only to avoid bloodshed.

Despite Monck's guarantee of a pardon, Haselrig was targeted by the Royalist Silius Titus, who was also responsible for disinterring the bodies of Cromwell, Bradshaw and Ireton and having them ritually executed at Tyburn. His life was spared but he was imprisoned in the Tower of London where he died on 7 January 1661.

== Character ==
Clarendon described Haselrig as "an absurd, bold man." He was rash, "hare-brained," and devoid of tact and had little claim to the title of a statesman, but his energy in the field and in parliament was often of great value to the parliamentary cause. He exposed himself to considerable obloquy by his exactions and appropriations of confiscated landed property, though the accusation brought against him by John Lilburne was examined by a parliamentary committee and adjudged to be false.

== Legacy ==
In 1646, Haselrig purchased Auckland Castle, previously home of the Bishop of Durham, and replaced it with a new country house. After the 1660 Restoration, the property was returned to the Church of England, and the new bishop, John Cosin, demolished Haselrig's home and constructed his own. In 2024, a team of archaeologists began excavating the area, looking for traces of Haselrig's building.

== Sources ==
- Dodds, Glen (1996). Historic Sites of County Durham. Albion. ISBN 978-0-9525122-5-7.
1. Firth, Charles Harding (1891). "Hesilrige, Arthur". In Stephen, Leslie; Lee, Sidney (eds.). Dictionary of National Biography. Vol. 26. London: Smith, Elder & Co., and authorities there quoted; Early History of the Family of Hesilrige, by WGD Fletcher;
2. Cat. of State Papers Domestic, 1631–1664, where there are a large number of important references, as also in Hist. manuscripts, Comm. Series Manuscripts of Earl Cooper, Duke of Leeds and Duke of Portland;
3. also SR Gardiner, Hist. of England Hist. of the Great Civil War and Commonwealth;
4. Clarendon's History State Papers and Cal. of State Papers, John Langton Sanford's Studies of the Great Rebellion. His life is written by Noble in the House of Cromwell,

Parliament of England
Vacant Parliament suspended since 1629	Member of Parliament for Leicestershire; 1640–1653; With: Lord Grey of Ruthyn 1640; Henry Smith 1640–1653	Succeeded by Henry Danvers; Edward Smith; John Prat
Vacant Not represented in Barebones Parliament	Member of Parliament for Leicester; 1654–1659; With: William Stanley	Succeeded by Peter Temple
Preceded by Sir Thomas Beaumont, 1st Baronet; Francis Hacker	Member of Parliament for Leicestershire; 1659-1660; With: Henry Smith	Succeeded by Thomas Merry; Matthew Babington
Baronetage of England
Preceded by Thomas Hesilrige	Baronet (of Noseley Hall); 1629–1661	Succeeded by Arthur Hesilrige
