= Richard Atkyns =

English writer

- Born: 1615
- Died: 14 September 1677 (aged 61–62)
- Resting place: St. George-the-Martyr, Southwark
- Education: The Crypt School, Gloucester; Balliol College, Oxford

Richard Atkyns (1615 – 14 September 1677), was an English writer on printing.

== Education and early life ==
Atkyns was descended from an old Gloucestershire family that for upwards of a century leased from the dean and chapter of Gloucester the manor of Tuffley, two miles south-south-east from the cathedral city. After receiving a home education at the hands of two inefficient clerical tutors, he was sent to the Free (Crypt) Grammar School in Gloucester. Thence, at the age of fourteen, he proceeded to Balliol College, Oxford, as a gentleman commoner, where he remained two years, probably without taking a degree, as he afterwards informs us "that he was not so well grounded as he ought to have been to read a Greek or Latin author with pleasure." Several members of his family on his father's side having already distinguished themselves in the study of the law, it was resolved to send him to Lincoln's Inn, where several of them "had anciently been and some of them there; but receiving some disgust at his entrance" he was recalled thence and sent to travel abroad with the only son of Lord Arundel of Wardour, who was about his own age. The Arundels being staunch Roman Catholics, while Atkyns was a Protestant, each youth was accompanied by a tutor of his own faith. The party left Dover in October 1636 or 1637, and travelled, by way of Calais, to Douai, where they stayed some time at the English College; thence they set out, by way of Cambray and St. Quentin, to Paris. Before the winter was ended the three years' travel was abruptly terminated by the death of young Arundel, who, "getting a heat and cold at tennis", probably in Paris, died from fever at Orléans. Soon afterwards Atkyns returned to England and betook himself to country affairs. On the death of his father, in 1636, he succeeded to the family estates at the age of twenty-one. After the days of mourning for his father were ended, "he put off his hounds", came to London, "and kept his coach", and made his bow at court, where he was invited by the queen to assist at masques. He does not appear to have shone as a courtier, having, as he informs us, "found himself guilty of three imperfections, a blushing modesty, a flexible disposition, and no great diligence." These festive scenes at the court of Henrietta Maria were, however, soon to terminate in the turmoil of the English Civil War.

== Civil war ==
In 1642, Atkyns raised a troop of horse for the king at his own expense. His first skirmish appears to have taken place with Sir William Waller at Little Dean near Newnham on Severn. In the following year he was engaged at Reading and Bath, also at the taking of Bristol and at the raising of the siege of Gloucester in September. For his loyalty to the royal cause his estate was sequestrated by Parliament. In 1646, however, both houses passed an ordinance pardoning his delinquency after imposing a fine of £140. After the Restoration, he was made Deputy Lieutenant for Gloucestershire, and was also reappointed to an agency for the crown connected in some way with printing, a post which he appears to have held originally as early as 1631, as he had already involved himself "in several great and chargeable suites against the Company of Stationers at the cost of more than £1,000."

== The "Exposicio" ==
About 1660 there was discovered in the public library of Cambridge an early work, said to have been printed at Oxford in 1468, on the Apostles' Creed. Its title ran Exposicio sancti Jeronimi in simbolum apostolorum ad papam Laurentium. Impressa Oxonie et finita anno Domini 1468, 4to. Shortly after its appearance Atkyns printed and published an anonymous broadside entitled The Original and Growth of Printing. This was afterwards, in 1664, enlarged, with answers to objections, and published in his own name in quarto. It is to this broadside and its reprint that Atkyns owes his fame, and by means of which, it is supposed, he hoped to repair his shattered fortunes by proving that the right and title of printing belonged to the crown alone, and by securing for himself the office of patentee for the printing of law books.

He first endeavoured to establish that printing in England began at Oxford; and that Stow, Sir Richard Baker, and Howell, in asserting that the art of printing was introduced into England in 1472, "do most erroneously agree together", although their error might have arisen "through the mistake of the first writer only." His discovery of the Exposicio is his leading argument. He writes that:

"A Book came into my hands, printed at Oxford in 1468, which was three years before any of the recited authors would allow it to be in England. The same most worthy Person, who trusted me with the aforesaid Book, did also present him with a copy of a Record and MS. in Lambeth House, heretofore in his custody, belonging to the See, and not to any particular Archbishop of Canterbury, the substance wereof was (of which the following is an outline) that Thomas Bourchier, Archbishop of Canterbury, moved the then King (Henry VI) to use all possible means for procuring a Printing Mold … to which the King readily harkened and committed the Management of the Design to Mr. R. Turnour … who took to his assistance Mr. Caxton. After having spent 1,500 marks in gifts and expenses they succeeded in bringing over from Harlem one of Cuthenburg's (sic) under-workmen, whose name was Frederick Corsells, or rather Corsellis, and brought him safe to London. It not being thought prudent to set him on work there, Corsellis was carried with a guard to Oxford, which guard constantly watched, to prevent Corsellis from any possible escape till he had made good his Promise in teaching how to Print. So that at Oxford Printing was first set up in England."

Atkyns naively adds that he would not have undertaken this work were it not for a double notion that he was too much a friend to truth and a friend to himself "not to love one of my best arguments of Instituting the King to this Art [of printing] in his private capacity", for which of course Atkyns was to be one of the agents. Atkyns's story has long since been discredited. It is only by implication that Atkyns himself infers from the manuscript that the printer of the Exposicio was one Corsellis; the researches of a host of bibliographers, from the learned Dr. Conyers Middleton downwards, have proved, moreover, that the book was antedated by ten years, probably by the omission of an X by the printer by design or accident; it has also been shown that no other book was printed at Oxford until 1479. As to "the Record and MS. in Lambeth House", one fatal objection to the story of Caxton and Corsellis contained in it is, that the former has not made the slightest allusion to it even in his Polychronicon, which is brought down to the end of the reign of Henry VI. Again, Dr. Ducarel, the librarian at Lambeth, one of the greatest antiquarians of his time, and who made complete indexes to the registers and manuscripts under his care, after fruitless research for the record alluded to by Atkyns, declared its existence to be a myth, and the whole story of Corsellis "a mere fable." Whether Atkyns was the inventor of it, or a dupe of others, cannot now be determined; but one thing is clear, that he was an interested person, and had it not been from a private motive he would not have advanced such a story, which has in almost every sentence a ring of falsehood and improbability.

== Death ==
Whatever immediate advantage Atkyns may have gained by its publication, misfortune swiftly overtook him; within three years he was committed to the Marshalsea in Southwark for debt, brought about partly by his own imprudence, partly by the vagaries and extravagances of his wife. He died without issue on 14 September 1677, and was buried two days later by relatives in the adjoining church of St. George-the-Martyr without any religious ceremony.

== Publications ==
The writings of Atkyns are:

- The Original and Growth of Printing, collected out of History and the Records of this Kingdom, &c., London, 1664, 4to, 24 pp.
- The King's Grant of Privilege for Sole Printing of Common Law Books Defended, &c., London, 1669, 4to, 17 pp., b.l. (anonymous, ascribed to Atkyns from internal evidence)
- Vindication of Richard Atkyns, Esq., as also a Relation of several Passages in the Western War wherein he was concerned, together with certaine Sighs or Ejaculations at the end of every chapter, London, 1669, 4to, 80 pp. This last work has been wholly misunderstood by his biographers, the three paragraphs in the title having been taken for three separate works. It is an exceedingly curious Apologia, with only one reference to his printing troubles, "dedicated to his particular Friends and intended to no other."
