= Henry Bard, 1st Viscount Bellomont =

Irish noble (1616–1656)

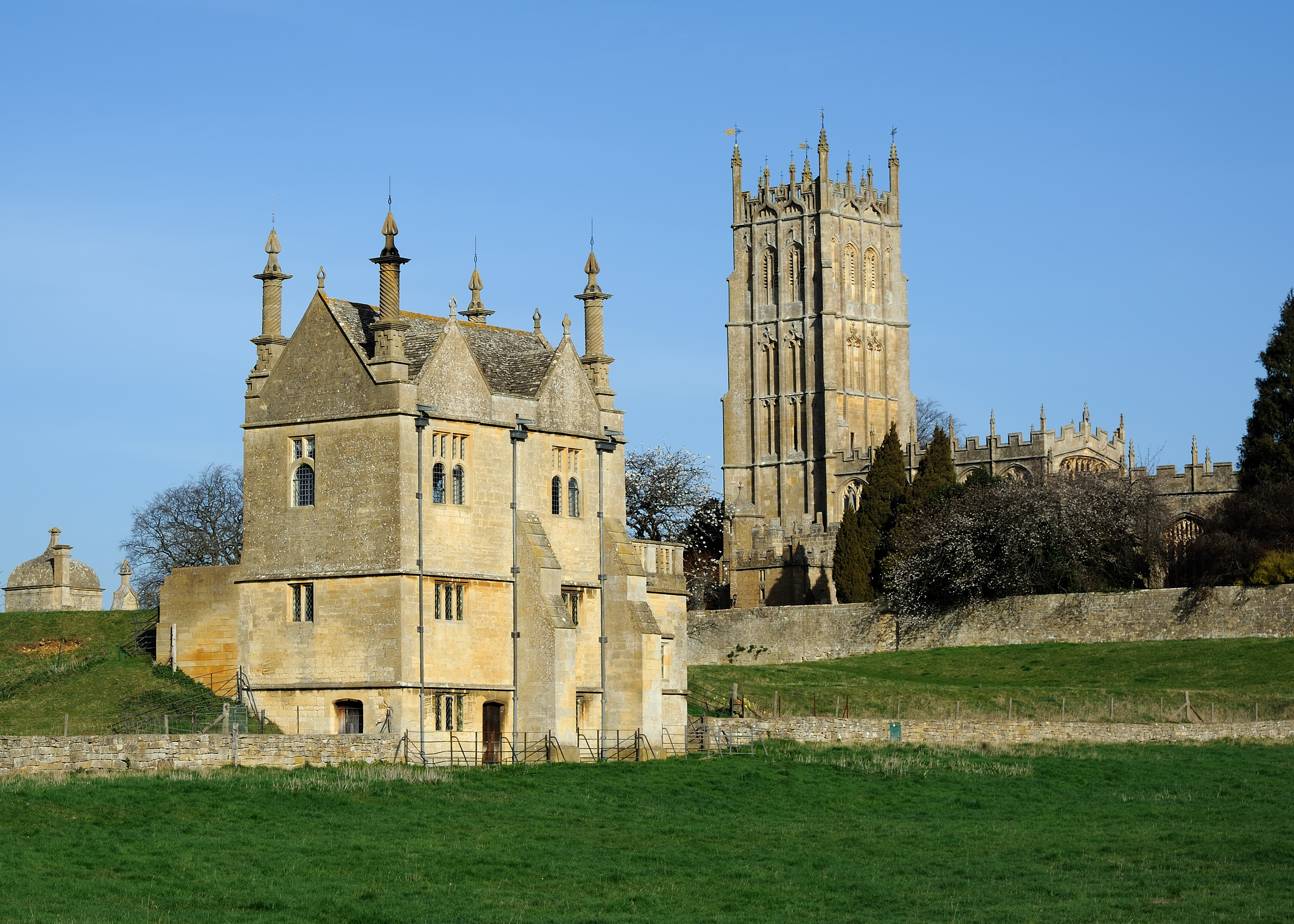
- Chipping Camden; Bard served there as Royalist governor in 1645

Royalist Envoy to Abbas II of Persia and Emperor Shah Jahan
- In office 1653–1656

Royalist Governor of Worcester, England
- In office July 1645 – January 1646

Royalist Governor of Chipping Camden
- In office November 1644 – May 1645

Personal details
- Born: 1616 Staines-upon-Thames
- Died: 20 June 1656 (aged 40) Hodal
- Resting place: Agra
- Party: Royalist
- Spouse: Anne Gardiner (1645-his death)
- Children: Frances (1646-1708), Charles Rupert (1648-1667); Anne (1650-after 1668); Persiana (1653-1739)
- Education: King's College, Cambridge
- Occupation: Diplomat, traveller and soldier

Military service
- Rank: Colonel
- Battles/wars: Wars of the Three Kingdoms; First Newbury; Cheriton (WIA); Lostwithiel; Second Newbury; Storming of Leicester; Naseby

Henry Bard, 1st Viscount Bellomont (1616 – June 20, 1656) was a soldier and diplomat from Staines. He served in the Wars of the Three Kingdoms, then as envoy from the exiled Charles II of England to Safavid Iran and the Mughal Empire, where he died in 1656.

Born in Staines, Bard traveled through Europe and the Near East prior to the outbreak of the First English Civil War in August 1642. He joined the Royalist army and despite losing an arm at Cheriton in March 1644, commanded a brigade at Naseby in 1645. After Charles I surrendered in May 1646, Bard was created Viscount Bellomont and sent to Ireland to recruit men for the Royalist cause.

His ship was stopped while crossing the Irish Sea and he was arrested, then released in 1647 after agreeing to go into exile and not return to England until given permission. He remained with the exiled court of Charles II until 1653 when he left on his mission, arriving in Isfahan in 1654 accompanied by his secretary Niccolao Manucci. At the end of 1655, they continued from Isfahan to India where Bard died in June 1656; Manucci settled in Delhi and wrote a first hand account of the Mughal Empire which contains details of their journey.

Although John Hall, a contemporary from Cambridge University, described him as a "man of very presentable body and stout and undaunted courage", moderate Royalists like Clarendon criticised his brutality. This included his role in the killing of civilians at Leicester in June 1645, and alleged involvement in the 1649 murder of Isaac Dorislaus, then Commonwealth ambassador to the Dutch Republic.

== Personal details ==
Henry Bard was born in Staines-upon-Thames in early 1616, youngest son of the Reverend George Bard (ca 1575–1616), vicar of St Mary's, Staines and his wife Susan Dudley. His father died soon after his birth, leaving six children; in addition to Henry, they included William (ca 1603-?), Maximilian (1606–1691), George, Margaret and Elizabeth. Maximilian became a wealthy London merchant, who left an estate worth £40,000 when he died and supported Henry financially for much of his life.

Bard married Anne Gardiner (?-after 1668) in 1645 and they had four surviving children; Frances (1646–1708), Charles Rupert (1648–1667), killed serving in Saint Kitts, Anne (1650-after 1668) and Persiana (1653–1739), who married her cousin Nathaniel. Frances, a famous beauty, became the mistress of Prince Rupert in 1664, by whom she had a son Dudley Bard (1666–1688).

== Career ==
Bard's war 1642 to 1646; key locations

Although George Bard was the eldest son, the family estates near Tealby and Sixhills in Lincolnshire were left to his younger brother Thomas (1581-after 1627). Despite this, there was enough money for Henry to be educated at Eton College and King's College, Cambridge, where he became a fellow in 1636. From 1638 to 1642, he traveled extensively through Europe and the Near East, possibly acting as a trading agent for his brother. He obtained a copy of the Quran while in Egypt and presented it to King's College Library on his return where it remains.

When the First English Civil War began in August 1642, Bard enrolled in Pinchbeck's Regiment, part of the Royalist northern army based in York. In February 1643, Queen Henrietta Maria landed in Bridlington with a large shipment of weapons purchased in the Dutch Republic for transport to the Royalist war-time capital at Oxford. On 16 May, Bard and Pinchbeck arrived in Oxford with a consignment of gunpowder; their regiment fought at First Newbury in September, where Pinchbeck was badly wounded and later died of his injuries in January 1644.

Shortly after Newbury, Charles I agreed a truce or "Cessation" with Confederate Ireland, allowing him to use troops from the Irish Royal Army in England. Promoted colonel, Bard was sent to Ireland to recruit additional regiments and was knighted on his return in December. He took over Pinchbeck's regiment and fought under Sir Ralph Hopton at Cheriton in March 1644; he was wounded and captured after launching an unauthorised attack which largely contributed to the Royalist defeat.

Since his injuries led to the amputation of an arm, Bard was released in May but rather than retiring rejoined the king and took part in the 1644 western campaign, including the Battle of Lostwithiel and Second Newbury. He was made a baronet in October and governor of Chipping Camden, where he quickly established a reputation for brutality and extortion. By early 1645, the Royalists were short of men and to bolster the Oxford field army reduced their garrisons, including the one at Chipping Camden; before doing so, Bard destroyed his headquarters at Camden Hall.

Now commander of a brigade or tercio, Bard played a leading role in the capture of Leicester on 29 May, in which over 700 civilians and prisoners were massacred after surrendering. At Naseby on 14 June, the Oxford field army was destroyed, reducing the Royalist presence outside South West England to a few isolated garrisons. These included Worcester, where Bard was appointed governor; he began raising money and men but in May Charles surrendered to the Scots Covenanters outside Newark on Trent and the war ended when Oxford capitulated in June.

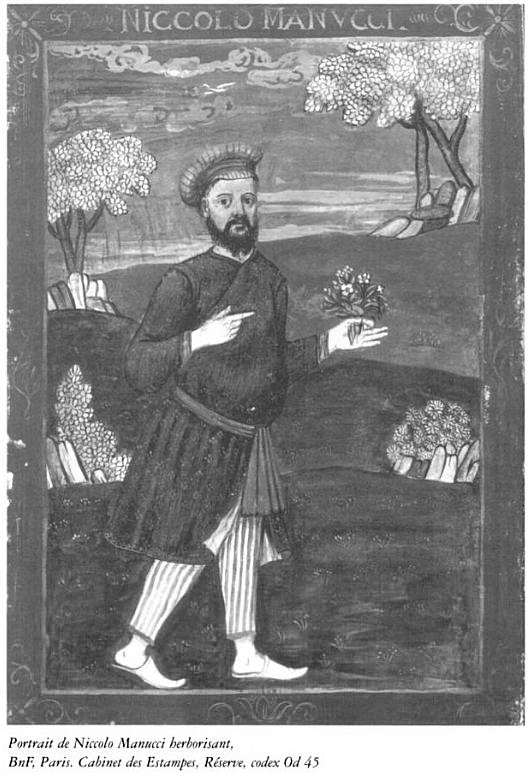
Niccolao Manucci; Bard's secretary, who recorded details of their journey to Iran and India

Despite military defeat, Charles attempted to regain his political position by building a coalition of moderate Parliamentarians and English, Scottish and Irish Royalists. On 8 July 1646, Bard was created Viscount Bellomont and given a commission to raise a regiment of cavalry in Ireland but was captured by the Parliamentarian navy crossing the Irish Sea and held in Plymouth. With the help of his brother Maximilian, he was released in December 1647 after promising to go into exile and not to return without permission. He and his family joined the court of Charles II in The Hague, where he converted to Catholicism.

This meant he took no part in the 1648 Second English Civil War, which resulted in the trial and execution of Charles I in January 1649. On 12 May 1649, he was arrested and charged with the murder of Isaac Dorislaus, newly installed Commonwealth ambassador to the Dutch Republic, but was released without charge. In 1653, he was sent as an envoy from Charles to Shah Abbas II of Persia, seeking payment of an alleged debt for English support in the 1622 capture of Ormuz. This proved unsuccessful and in 1655, he went onto India, hoping to obtain aid from Shah Jahan.

He reached Surat in January 1656 but died at Hodal on 20 June while making his way to Delhi and was later buried in the Catholic cemetery in Agra. He was accompanied by Niccolao Manucci, a 19 year old recruited in Venice to act as his guide, who settled in India and wrote a comprehensive first hand account of the Mughal Empire.

== Sources ==
- Lockhart, Laurence (1966). "The Diplomatic Missions of Henry Bard, Viscount Bellomont, to Persia and India". Iran. 4: 97–104. doi:10.2307/4299578. JSTOR 4299578.
- Newman, Peter Robert (1978). The Royalist Army in Northern England; Volume II (PDF) (PHD). York University.
- Manucci, Niccolao; Irvine, William (1907). Storia do Mogor; or, Mogul India 1653-1708; Volume 1 (2016 ed.). Palala Press. ISBN 978-1354999790.
- Morgan, Basil (2004). "Bard, Henry, first Viscount Bellomont [Bellamont](1615/16–1656)". Oxford Dictionary of National Biography (online ed.). Oxford University Press. doi:10.1093/ref:odnb/1356. (Subscription, Wikipedia Library access or UK public library membership required.)
- Porter, Stephen; Thirsk, Joan (1994). Destruction in the English Civil Wars. Sutton Publishing Ltd. ISBN 978-0750905169.
- Royle, Trevor (2004). Civil War: The Wars of the Three Kingdoms 1638–1660 (2006 ed.). Abacus. ISBN 978-0-349-11564-1.
- Seilhamer, George Overcash (1908). The Bard family; a history and genealogy of the Bards of Carroll's Delight. Kittochtinny Press.
- Spencer, Charles (2007). Prince Rupert: The Last Cavalier. Phoenix Press. ISBN 978-0-297-84610-9.
- Young, Peter (1939). "King Charles I's army of 1643-1645". Journal of the Society for Army Historical Research. 18 (69): 27–37. JSTOR 44219782.

Peerage of Ireland
New creation	Viscount Bellomont; 1646–1656	Succeeded by Charles Rupert Bard
Baronetage of England
New creation	Baronet (of Staines); 1644–1656	Succeeded by Charles Rupert Bard
