= Shuckburgh =

Shuckburgh may refer to:

== Places ==
- Shuckburgh (crater), lunar crater in the northeastern part of the Moon's near side
- Lower Shuckburgh, small village in eastern Warwickshire
- Shuckburgh Hall, privately owned country house mansion at Lower Shuckburgh, near Daventry, Warwickshire

== People ==
- Sir George Shuckburgh-Evelyn, 6th Baronet (1751–1804), English politician, mathematician and astronomer
- William Shuckburgh Swayne (1862–1941), Anglican priest and author
- Sir Evelyn Shuckburgh (1909–1994), British diplomat
- Evelyn Shirley Shuckburgh (1843–1906), English schoolmaster, classical scholar, and translator
- Alexander Shuckburgh (born 1982), also known as Al Shux, music producer and songwriter
- Shukburgh Ashby (1724–1792), British politician

== Other ==
- Shuckburgh Baronets in the County of Warwick, a title in the Baronetage of England
- Shuckburgh telescope, an astronomical instrument built for the 6th baronet
