= John Keating (judge) =

Irish judge

John Keating, or Keatinge (c. 1630–1691) was an Irish judge of the late seventeenth century, who held office as Chief Justice of the Irish Common Pleas. He had an impressive reputation for integrity, impartiality and benevolence. Due to his loyalty to King James II of England, he was dismissed from his office as Chief Justice after the Revolution of 1688. Later, faced with the threat of impeachment, he committed suicide.

== Family and early career ==
He was born in Dublin, the second son of Edmund Keating of Narraghmore, County Kildare and Elizabeth (or Elinor) Eustace. His mother was the daughter of John Fitzwilliam Eustace of Harristown, County Kildare, and sister of Sir Maurice Eustace, later Lord Chancellor of Ireland. He had one older brother, Oliver, who died in 1683, and at least one sister Catherine, who died in 1699. Catherine married firstly the senior judge Adam Cusack, Chief Justice of Connacht, who died in 1681, and secondly the Jacobite leader Colonel Nicholas Cusack (died 1726), a great-grandson of Sir Thomas Cusack, Lord Chancellor of Ireland.

Keating, like his uncle Maurice, combined membership of the Church of Ireland with a notable tolerance in religious matters, which led to claims in later life that he was himself secretly a crypto-Catholic. The Keating family lived as permanent guests of Eustace on his Palmerstown estate, which he bought around 1647, and it later became the home of John and his wife.

Keating graduated from Trinity College Dublin in 1655 and entered Lincoln's Inn in 1657; it was said that his knowledge of the law was well below that of his fellow students, although his friends attributed his ignorance to the neglect of his legal studies, his time being taken up with his courtship of the widowed Grace, Lady Shuckburgh, whom he married in 1659. In 1661 he returned to Ireland and became Deputy Clerk to the Irish House of Commons. This job involved a great deal of travel between Dublin and London, and Keating displayed impressive energy in performing his duties, on one occasion completing the return journey in twelve days in the depth of winter, for which task he was paid £200. Due to his diligence in performing his official duties, he later received a gratuity of £300.

He entered the King's Inns in 1662 and, despite earlier criticism of his deficiencies in legal knowledge, he quickly gained a reputation as a gifted barrister. His uncle, the Lord Chancellor, recommended him as a candidate for judicial office to James Butler, 1st Duke of Ormonde, the Lord Lieutenant of Ireland, whose friendship was then the usual path to the Bench. Keating was content for the time being with the minor position of Attorney General to the Duke of York; he admitted that he could not afford financially to give up his practice at the Irish Bar, and in addition said that he did not wish to arouse the envy of his older colleagues.

He acted as legal adviser to several members of the Butler dynasty. In 1675 he was raised to the Bench as Chief Judge (or Seneschal) of the Palatine court of Tipperary, a position in Ormonde's gift, and which was generally regarded as a sinecure rather than a major judicial office (although for at least part of its history, the Court's workload was heavy enough to require the appointment of a second judge, called the Master of the Rolls).

== Chief Justice ==
Given Keating's previous reluctance to accept a seat on the High Court Bench, his appointment as Chief Justice of the Common Pleas in 1679, when he had no judicial experience other than as a palatine judge in Tipperary, may seem surprising. Even more surprising was the choice of a judge who was widely suspected of Roman Catholic leanings, since the anti-Catholic hysteria engendered by the Popish Plot was at its height, and it was rumoured that Keating himself might be accused of complicity in the Plot. It is likely, as Elrington Ball suggests, that Charles II chose Keating precisely because his well-known tolerance in matters of religion meant that he was unlikely to succumb to the prevailing anti-Catholic mood. In particular, he was expected to quash an unfounded charge of treason made against Richard Power, 1st Earl of Tyrone, and duly did so. As belief in the Plot waned, Keating, clearly indicating his own scepticism on the issue, secured the acquittal of several defendants accused of playing a part in it.

In the following years, he gained an impressive reputation for integrity, impartiality and mercy, and as a result, he made political enemies on all sides. He was offered the office of Lord Chief Justice of Ireland in 1681, but declined it. He suffered seriously from overwork in the period 1681-2, as due to the death or illness of his colleagues he was often required to sit alone in the Common Pleas. He was also a Governor of the Erasmus Smith schools.

His reputation for mercy towards wrongdoers did not extend to those charged with cattle theft, which was regarded as a serious social evil at the time: in such cases, he was prepared to drive hard for a conviction. In the leading case of R. v Cavenagh in 1689, he broke with all precedent in refusing to allow two convicted cattle thieves to plead benefit of clergy for a first offence. Both were hanged.

== Dismissal and death ==
During the politically turbulent years 1688–1691, Keating was in a particularly difficult position since, unlike some of his colleagues, he was very anxious to retain office. During James II's first year in Ireland, Keating showed himself to be a staunch loyalist, praying publicly for the King and referring to the Glorious Revolution as an "invasion". James was seemingly impressed, and Keating was given a prominent place in the opening of the Patriot Parliament of 1689; yet within days, his enemies had him dismissed from the Privy Council of Ireland. He is also said to have resented being required to accept Catholic judges as colleagues on the Court of Common Pleas, despite his usual tolerance in matters of religion.

The collapse of the Jacobite cause in the following year placed Keating in an impossible position, which explains his frequently puzzling behaviour. He could not seriously have expected to be allowed to keep his office, yet he undoubtedly made friendly advances to the new administration, possibly with the help of his brother-in-law Colonel Cusack, who played a part in negotiating the Treaty of Limerick. These advances met with a cold reception: Keating was dismissed from office, imprisoned for a time and threatened with impeachment. He committed suicide early in 1691, probably in a fit of depression, but (against the normal rules in such cases) was permitted a Christian burial in Palmerstown churchyard, where his wife and parents are also buried.

== Marriage ==
In 1659 he married Grace Holte, daughter of the prominent landowner and Royalist Sir Thomas Holte of Aston Hall by his first wife Grace Bradbourne, and widow of Sir Richard Shuckburgh. Grace died in 1677; Keating erected a memorial to her in Palmerstown Chapel, Dublin, with an inscription paying eloquent testimony to their happy marriage. He erected a similar memorial at her other family's parish church in Lower Shuckburgh, Warwickshire.

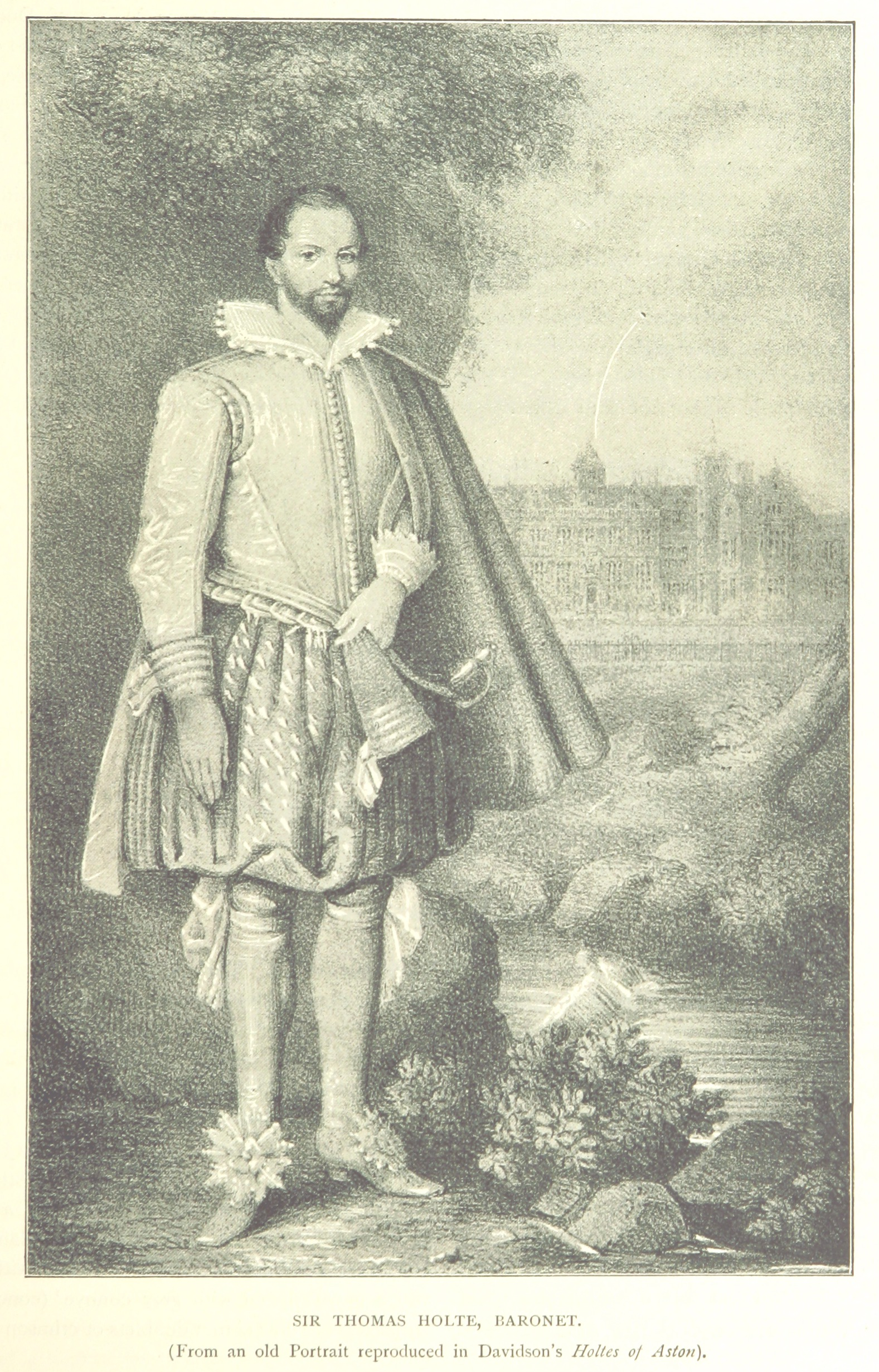
Sir Thomas Holte, father of Keating's wife Grace.

There were no children of this marriage (Grace was much older than her husband), but she had seven surviving children by her first marriage, including Sir John Shuckburgh (1635–1661), first of the Shuckburgh Baronets, Elizabeth who married Sir Edward Waldo of Harrow, London, and Grace, who married firstly Sir John Bernard, 2nd Baronet, and secondly Thomas Mariet.

== Character and reputation ==
Historians on the whole have dealt kindly with Keating both as a man and as a judge. The more critical among them, like Elrington Ball, have accused him of clinging to office in an undignified manner, and the Cavenagh case shows that he could be merciless enough when he thought there was a danger of a felon escaping justice. Yet there is impressive evidence of his good qualities. Duhigg, in a celebrated passage, called him: "the great ornament of the Irish Bench ... a great magistrate who in a slippery or stormy period exercised official station with mild manners and untainted integrity. This great man was calm, patient and humane in the trial of prisoners; clear, laborious and consistent in the discussion of civil suits; faithful to his King and country in the indulgence of political principles; and attached to God in the exercise of Christianity."

Legal offices
Preceded by Robert Booth	Chief Justice of the Irish Common Pleas; 1679–1691	Succeeded by Sir Richard Pyne
