= Charles Gerald Stewkley Shuckburgh =

English cricketer and baronet

Sir Charles Gerald Stewkley Shuckburgh, 12th Baronet (28 February 1911 – 4 May 1988) was the 12th baronet of the Shuckburgh baronets of Shuckburgh Hall, Warwickshire. He was a first-class cricketer who played in a single match for Warwickshire in 1930. He was born at Lower Shuckburgh, Warwickshire, the elder son of the 11th baronet. Shuckburgh was educated at Harrow School and at Trinity College, Oxford.

== Cricket career ==
He was prominent in cricket at Harrow and played in the Eton v Harrow match at Lord's in three seasons from 1927 to 1929 as a right-handed middle order batsman. At Oxford University, he played in the freshmen's trial match in 1930, but was not successful and did not appear in any first-class cricket for the university side. That same year, however, he played for Warwickshire in a high-scoring match against Nottinghamshire, but failed to score in his only innings.

== Military career ==
He was commissioned into the Territorial Army on 29 June 1938 and appointed to the City of London Yeomanry (Rough Riders), which was being expanded from a single artillery battery to form a new 11th (CoLY) Light Anti-Aircraft Regiment, Royal Artillery. The regiment defended vital points in West London from air attack during the early part of World War II. In September 1941, as a captain, he was one of a number of officers transferred from the 11th (CoLY) LAA Regiment to a new 73rd LAA Regiment, with Shuckburgh serving as adjutant. By March 1942 he was a major and battery commander, but went into hospital and was struck off the strength of the regiment and posted to the Royal Artillery Depot. He ended the war in the rank of major and was awarded the Territorial Decoration in 1946.

== Family ==
He married Remony Dorothy Bell, only daughter of the late Frederick N. Bell of Buenos Aires, on 11 December 1935, but she died on 2 May 1936. He married secondly, on 22 May 1937, Nancy Diana Mary Lubbock, only daughter of Captain Rupert Egerton Lubbock, RN, grandson of Sir John Lubbock, 3rd Baronet, and nephew of John Lubbock, 1st Baron Avebury. They had four children:

- Remony Charmian, born 27 April 1938
- Robin James Stewkley, born 7 December 1941, died 20 March 1944
- Amanda Maria, born 15 July 1946
- Sir Rupert Charles Gerald Shuckburgh, 13th Baronet, born 12 February 1949, died 2012

He inherited the baronetcy from his father in 1939 and was later High Sheriff and Deputy Lieutenant for Warwickshire. He died at White Colne, Colchester, Essex.

Baronetage of England
| Preceded by Gerald Shuckburgh | Baronet (of Shuckburgh); 1939–1988 | Succeeded by Rupert Shuckurgh |
