= Sir Richard Shuckburgh =

Sir Richard Shuckbugh (1596-1656) of Upper Shuckburgh, Warwickshire was a politician who sat in the House of Commons from 1640.

== Life ==
He was the second son of John Shuckburgh (d. 1631) of Upper Shuckburgh and Mary, daughter of Richard Middlemore of Edgbaston. His mother came from a recusant family. He matriculated at Lincoln College, Oxford in 1615 and was awarded his BA in the same year. His elder brother having died, he inherited the family estate on his father's death. His election as MP for Warwickshire at a second poll in 1640 was engineered by the royalist faction. His royalism led him into conflict with the dominant faction in the Long Parliament and he withdrew to his estate. He allegedly encountered [Charles I] when out hunting and agreed to join the king's forces. He was present at the battle of Edgehill the following day and was knighted. He returned to Upper Shuckburgh after the battle, where he was wounded resisting a parliamentary attack. He was taken as a prisoner to Kenilworth and expelled from the House of Commons. On his eventual release from imprisonment, having paid a substantial fine, he retired to his estate and lived quietly.

He was commemorated by a marble monument in the church of St John the Baptist, Upper Shuckburgh.

== Family ==
He married:

1. Mary (d. 1629), daughter of Ralph Sneyd of Keele Hall, Staffordshire and widow of William Crompton of Stone
2. Elizabeth, daughter of Sir Robert Lee of Billesley, Warwickshire
3. Grace (d.1677), daughter of Sir Thomas Holte of Aston Hall, Warwickshire, by whom he had six sons and four daughters. He was succeeded by his son John, who was created a baronet in 1660. His widow later married John Keating.
