= John Croft (architect) =

British architect

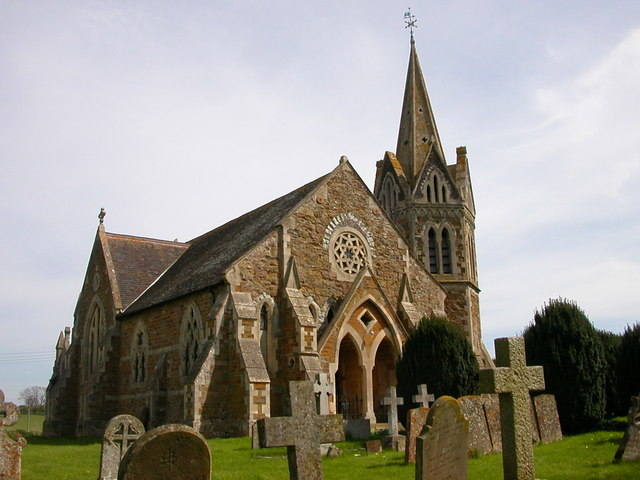
St John the Baptist, Lower Shuckburgh. Designed by John Croft.

John Croft (1800–1865) was a British architect, practising in Islington, London, who was one of the "rogue-architect"s described by Harry Stuart Goodhart-Rendel.

== Early life ==
John Croft was born in Bilston, Staffordshire, in 1800. He married Emma and at the time of the 1861 census was living at 26, Wellington Street, Islington, London. The census of that year records that he had three sons and a daughter. His sons Arthur (1828) and John (1841) were artists while his son Adolphus (1831) was an architect. He had a daughter Jessy (1841).

== Works ==
Croft designed the Church of St John the Baptist, Lower Shuckburgh, Warwickshire, on the site of an earlier church, almost nothing of which now remains. The building is grade II listed and was completed in 1860 or 1864. He also designed the vicarage.

Croft also designed All Saints, Cold Hanworth, Lincolnshire.
