= 73rd Light Anti-Aircraft Regiment, Royal Artillery =

73rd Light Anti-Aircraft Regiment, RA
- Royal Artillery cap badge
- Active: 27 February 1941–16 June 1945
- Country: United Kingdom
- Branch: British Army
- Role: Air Defence
- Size: Regiment
- Part of: 80th AA Brigade
- Engagements: London Blitz; D-Day; Defence of the Orne Bridges; Defence of Antwerp

The 73rd Light Anti-Aircraft Regiment (73rd LAA Rgt), was an air defence unit of the British Army's Royal Artillery during World War II. It served during the London Blitz, landed on D-Day, seeing action throughout the campaign in North West Europe and defending the cities of Belgium against V-1 flying bombs.

== Origin ==
The regiment was formed on 27 February 1941 as part of the rapid expansion of Britain's Anti-Aircraft (AA) defences. It was organised as follows:

- 218 LAA Battery formed at 208th LAA Training Rgt at Yeovil from a cadre supplied by 34th LAA Rgt
- 220 LAA Battery formed at 212th LAA Training Rgt at Saighton Camp from a cadre supplied by 17th LAA Rgt
- 221 LAA Battery formed at 212th LAA Training Rgt at Saighton from a cadre supplied by 45th LAA Rgt
  The three batteries were all formed on 12 December 1940 and regimented on 10 March 1941.

The regiment was assigned to 49th AA Brigade in 1st AA Division. This formed part of the London Inner Artillery Zone defending against the continuing Blitz.

A number of officers, including the Commanding Officer (CO), Lieutenant-Colonel John Anderson Armstrong, and the adjutant, Captain Sir Charles Shuckburgh, Bt, came to the regiment from the 11th (City of London Yeomanry) LAA Rgt within 49th AA Bde.

== The Blitz ==
RHQ was established at Sunningdale, soon afterwards moving to Stanwell. The three newly formed batteries were still training at LAA Practice Camps at Watchet (218 Bty) and Stiffkey (220 and 221 Btys). As they arrived they took over defence of Vulnerable Points (VPs) west of London: 218 Bty at Langley with eight Bofors 40 mm guns and at Surbiton with 12 Lewis guns; 220 Bty at Neasden (2 x Bofors), Hendon (2 x Bofors) and Northolt (8 x Bofors); 221 at Hatfield and Radlett. Most of these VPs were related to airfields and/or aircraft factories. Later some of these VPs were given up to other units and the regiment took over protection of vital waterworks at Hampton, Walton-on-Thames and Kempton Park. The regiment fired its first shots (at a passing Dornier Do 17 bomber) on 12 March. That month the regiment provided a number of volunteers and Bofors guns to provide AA cover aboard Merchant Navy ships. It was still receiving recruits from the training regiments – three whole Troops (providing a fourth Troop for each Battery: D, H and L) arrived from Stiffkey in early May – and further training was carried out at the batteries by instructors from 11th (CoLY) LAA Rgt.

More sites were given Bofors guns, and during May some of the static guns were converted to semi-mobile status by mounting them on travelling carriages. Also that month, 123rd Z Battery was temporarily attached to the regiment and took over some VPs with its rocket launchers. In September 1941 the regiment provided a cadre of experienced men to provide the basis of a new 296th LAA Bty formed by 208th LAA Training Regiment at Yeovil. In November this battery joined the regiment, replacing 221st Bty, which was transferred to a newly formed 97th LAA Rgt in 65th AA Brigade.

== Mobile training ==
In March 1942 the fourth Troop of each Battery was removed and constituted into a new 466th LAA Bty; this was mainly composed of men of low medical categories. 466th Battery remained regimented with 73rd LAA until July, when it was transferred to a new 141st LAA Rgt. On 14 August 1942, 73rd LAA Rgt handed over its responsibilities to 62nd LAA Rgt. It left 49th AA Bde and moved to Ampthill for a month's battle training, followed by a further month's mobile training at Leigh-on-Sea.

In November, after completion of this training, 73rd LAA Rgt was assigned to 71st AA Brigade in Kent, where it deployed to some of the most heavily attacked towns in the UK: 218 Bty at Dover, 221 Bty at Minster-in-Thanet, and 296 Bty at Deal, with RHQ at Shepherdswell. Anti-Aircraft Command had been increasing the LAA cover of the South Coast of England since the Luftwaffe began a campaign of 'hit and run' raids by fighter-bombers earlier in the year. Engagements between the regiment's guns and these raiders were frequent, with casualties on both sides. 218 Bty also suffered 11 men killed on 9 November when Dover was shelled by German cross-Channel guns.

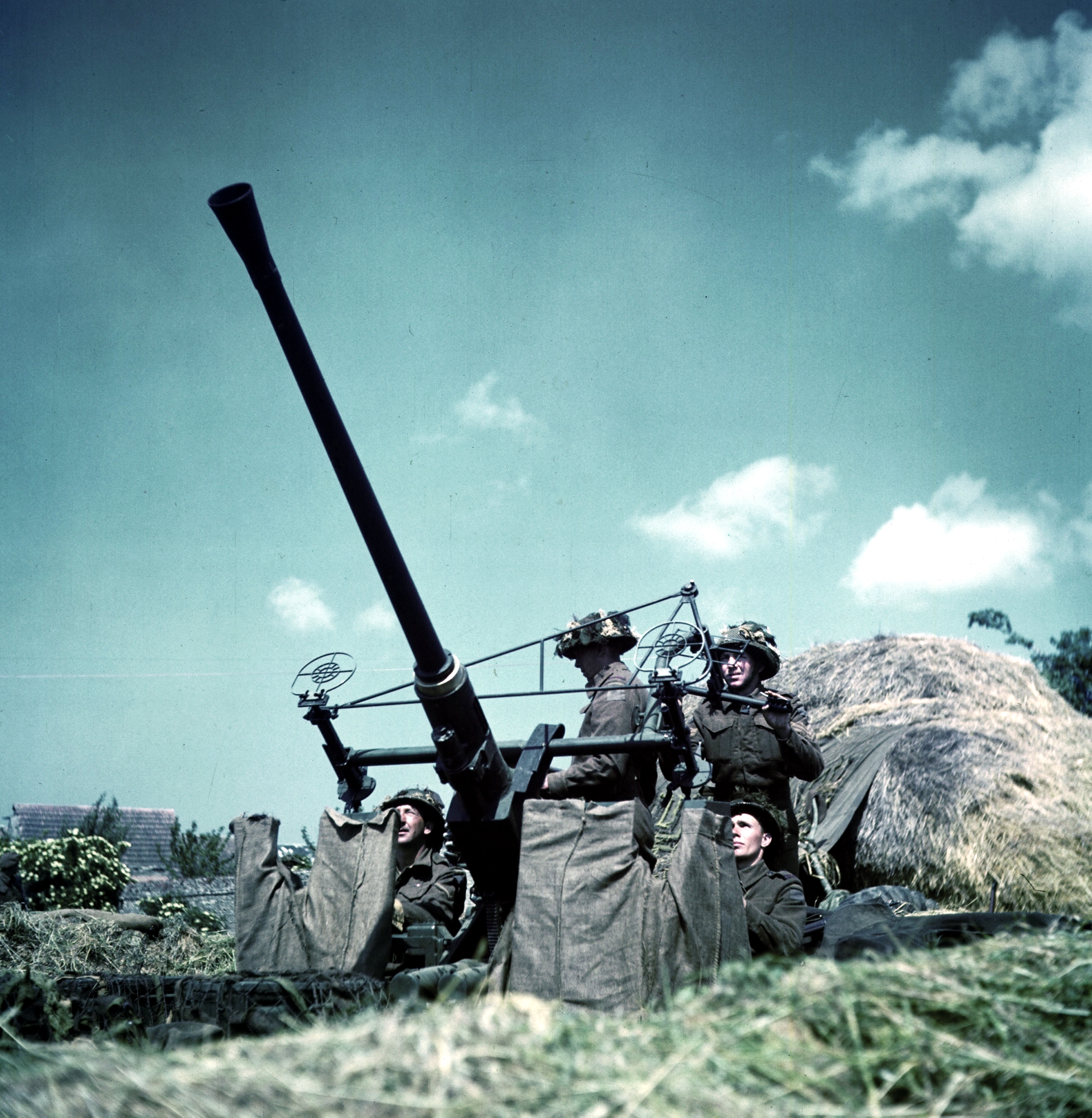
Bofors 40 mm LAA gun equipped with 'Stiffkey Stick' sights

On 10 December 1942, 73rd LAA Rgt was withdrawn from AA Command and joined Home Forces for advanced mobile training, which began round Ramsgate. As a mobile unit, it consisted of three Batteries, each composed of three Troops equipped with six towed Bofors guns using 'Stiffkey Stick' sights. It also had its own Royal Corps of Signals signal section and a Royal Electrical and Mechanical Engineers (REME) workshop, which joined in January 1943.

== Training for Overlord ==
At the end of January 1943, while still at Ramsgate, the regiment deployed in the semi-mobile role for 'Duckshooting' against the continuing 'hit and run' raids. On 20 February, it moved to Evans Lines at Blandford Camp, where it joined 76th AA Bde but transferred to 80th AA Bde when it was formed at Blandford in April. Both 76th and 80th AA Bdes were assigned to Second Army for the planned invasion of Europe (Operation Overlord).

The regiment moved its base to Ardrossan in Scotland in mid-May, but during the spring and summer of 1943 the unit took part in practice camps in various parts of the country and in training exercises simulating assault landings on a hostile shore. 220 Bty trained with No 6 Beach Group and 103rd Heavy AA Rgt, with which it would land on D-Day. When not training, the mobile regiments could be deployed to assist AA Command. In late August, on completion of a beach landing exercise in Pembrokeshire, 73rd LAA Rgt was attached to 5th AA Bde at Eastbourne, Brighton, Pevensey and Seaford, East Sussex on the South Coast, which was still subject to 'hit and run' attacks by the Luftwaffe. During the winter of 1943–44 the regiment was stationed in Ross and Cromarty and Morayshire in Scotland, with RHQ at Gordon Castle.

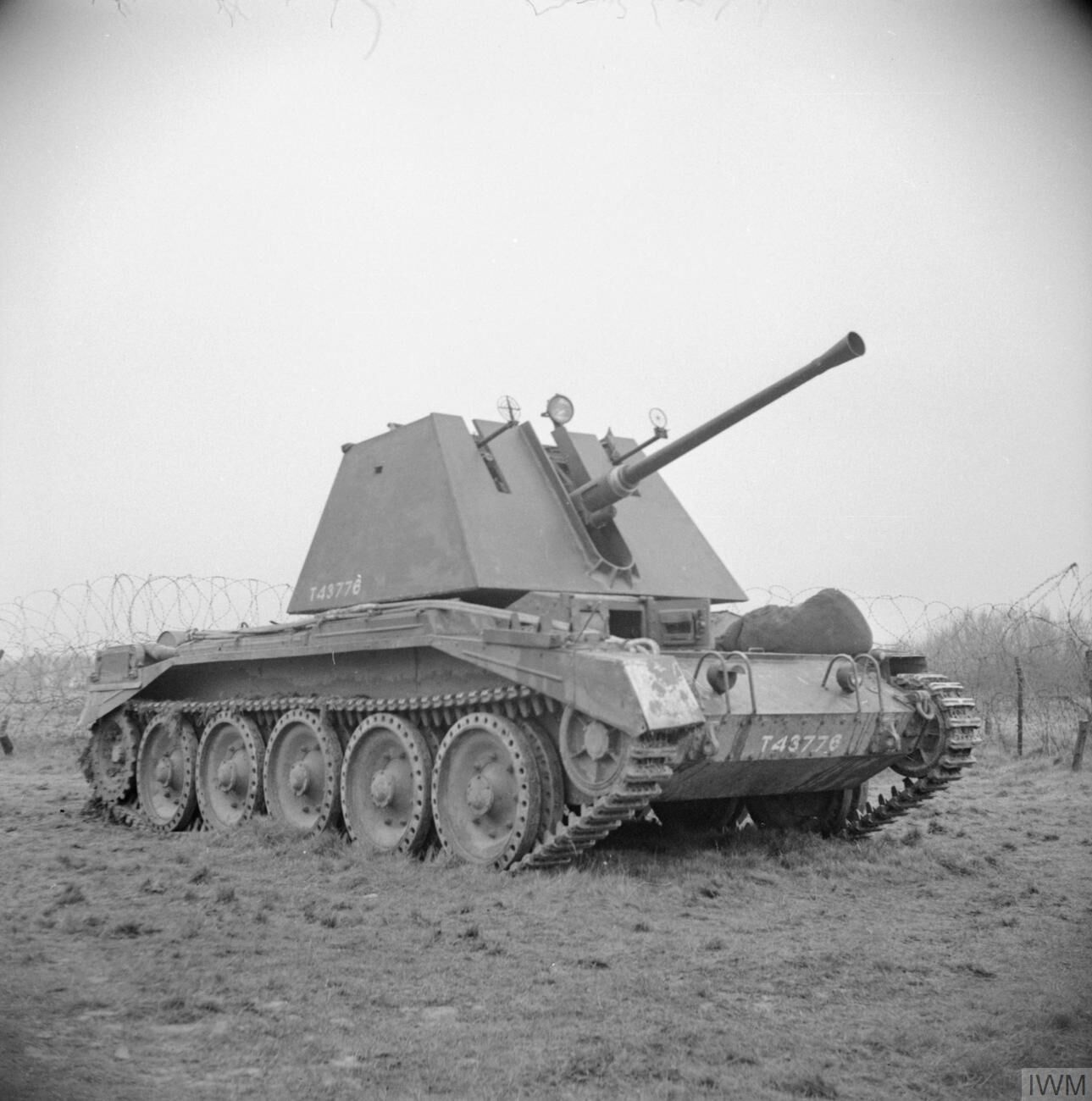
Crusader AA Mark I SP Bofors gun

In February 1944, the regiment received six Crusader AA Mark I tracked self-propelled (SP) Bofors guns, which would have a special role in the assault landing on D-Day. The following month it collected 24 SP Bofors (on Morris C9B 4 x 4 lorries).

Training continued through early 1944, with the regiment visiting No 16 AA Practice Camp at Clacton-on-Sea before moving to Slinfold in West Sussex. In May, the units of 80th AA Bde went to their marshalling areas to embark for the invasion. The assault elements of the regiment embarked at Portsmouth, the rear echelons at Tilbury.

== D-Day ==
For the Normandy landings, 80th AA Bde was assigned to support I Corps landing on Juno and Sword. The leading elements were to land with the assault waves on D-Day itself (6 June). Light AA defence was emphasised at the start of the operation, since low-level attack by Luftwaffe aircraft was considered the most likely threat and the designated assault regiments landed with minimum scales of equipment, to be brought up to strength by parties arriving later.

The leading units were formed into AA Assault Groups, and Lt-Col Armstrong with RHQ of 73rd LAA Rgt took charge of 'M' AA Assault Group landing on Queen Beach of Sword under the command of 3rd Division. The assault group included elements of 103rd HAA Rgt equipped with towed 3.7-inch guns and 93rd LAA Rgt equipped with the new 20 mm Polsten gun in triple mountings, half of them mounted on Crusader tank chassis.

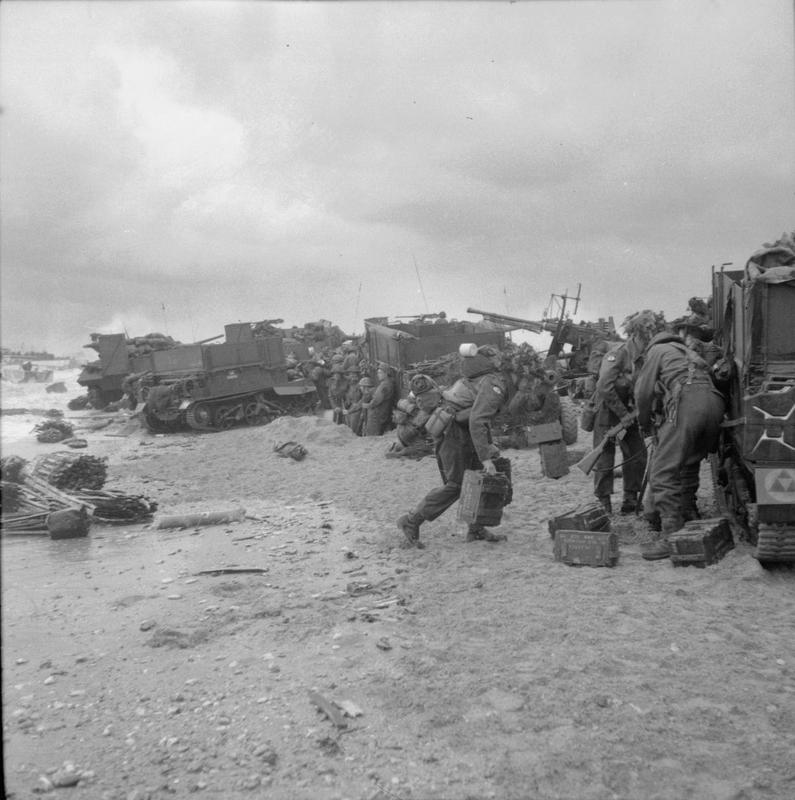
Troops of 3rd Division sheltering on Sword on D-Day, with Bofors gun in background.

M AA Assault Group

- 73rd LAA Rgt RHQ (Lt-Col J.A. Armstrong)
- 218/73 LAA Bty
- 296/73 LAA Bty less 2 Troops
- G & H Troops 322/93 LAA Bty
- 322/103 HAA Bty
- C Troop 323/103 HAA Bty
- B Troop 474th (Independent) Searchlight Battery
- 16 Fire Control Post
- 76 & 103 Coast Observation Detachments
- One Platoon 112 Company Pioneer Corps (smoke generators)
- 73 LAA Rgt Workshop, REME

220/73 LAA Bty and 1 Troop of 322/93 LAA Bty were assigned to the neighbouring 'N' AA Assault Group under RHQ of 103rd HAA Rgt. One troop of 296/73 LAA Bty was assigned to 'P' AA Assault Group on Juno Beach, the other was held in reserve in England.

The brigade experienced considerable problems during the landings, with losses of landing craft and hard fire-fights going on to establish a firm hold. A and C Troops of 218th Bty, less two guns each, landed at Queen White and Queen Red respectively, 45 minutes after H-Hour, when the beach was still under heavy fire. The Battery and A Troop commanders and the regimental medical officer were all wounded but carried on. The remaining guns of these Troops were landed, and the whole battery was in position five hours after H-Hour. By then, Lt-Col Armstrong had arrived and set up the AA command post on the beach. 220th Battery arrived late, found its intended positions to be still in enemy hands and could not begin landing until the following day (D+1) on Juno beach. Some of the AA gun detachments already ashore on Sword were involved in 'mopping up' isolated German strongpoints. Total casualties for the regiment on D-Day were one officer wounded and evacuated, one other rank killed, five wounded and one missing.

Communication problems meant that 73rd LAA Rgt remained out of contact with 80th AA Bde HQ until D+1. Luckily, Luftwaffe attacks on D-Day were few and sporadic, only increasing on D+1, by which time more guns of 73rd LAA Rgt had got ashore. The air attacks peaked on D+3.

B Troop of 218 Bty landed 38 hours late, at 0600 on D+2, and deployed at Ouistreham. This troop, together with B Troop of 322/103 HAA Bty, had a secondary coastal artillery role to protect shipping off Queen from attack by German E-boats, particularly at night. For this purpose 16 Fire Control Post and 76 and 103 Coast Observer detachments were landed with it, under command of 103rd HAA Rgt. The guns would fire blind, controlled by radar, or with the assistance of searchlights.

== Normandy ==
Once ashore the AA Assault Groups reorganised into temporary regimental groups, with regimental commanders acting as AA Defence Commanders (AADCs) in their immediate areas. Lieutenant-Colonel Armstrong was designated Commander, LAA Defence and Smoke, for 101 Beach SubArea, which controlled the landings and beach exits for Sword.

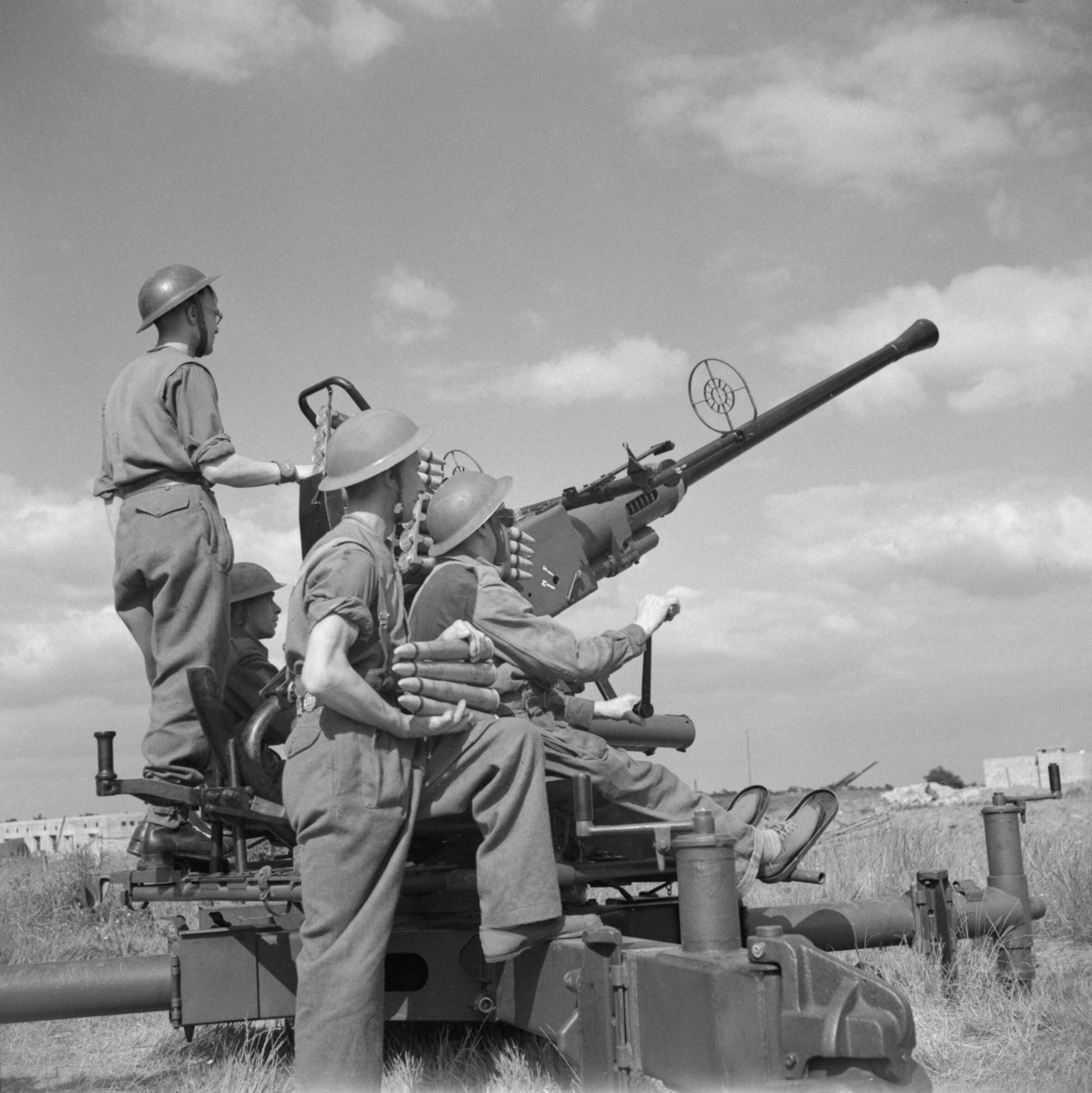
Bofors gun and crew, summer 1944

73 LAA Regimental Group

- All units 73rd LAA Rgt
- 322/93 LAA Bty
- B & C Troops 474 S/L Bty
- Section 112 Pioneer Company
- Detachment 63/20 LAA Bty manning Bofors and 20 mm guns on 'Gooseberry' blockships sunk off the beach as breakwaters
- A/139 LAA Rgt manning Bofors on five AA Barges lying off the beach

From D-Day to D+14 the beaches and supply dumps were under continuous attack from the air and from shell and mortar fire, but the LAA barrage was so effective that unloading work at Sword was never halted by air raids, and 17 enemy aircraft were shot down. Armstrong was later awarded an OBE for his work during this period.

As the build-up in the Normandy beachhead grew during June and July 1944, 80 AA Bde was tasked with protecting Juno and Sword, the small port of Ouistreham, and the River Orne and Caen Canal bridges. 73rd LAA Regiment was deployed round Sword, which remained under German shellfire and night bombing. Some of 63/20 LAA Bty's crews were washed off their Gooseberries and the blockship Courbet during the storm of 19/20 June, and they were sent to reinforce 73rd LAA Rgt. Other AA batteries arriving from the UK were temporarily attached to RHQ until their own regiments arrived. 322 Bty of 93rd LAA Rgt, with its Crusader-mounted triple 20mm guns remained with 73rd LAA Rgt guarding the Orne and Caen Canal bridges until mid-July. The rest of 296th Bty finally arrived on 20 July and went to thicken up the defences of Sword. By 13 August, the LAA beach defences could be reduced and the whole of 73rd LAA Rgt redeployed to the Caen Canal, with Lt-Col Armstrong appointed AADC Canal Zone.

At the end of August, 21st Army Group broke out from the Normandy beachhead and began to pursue the defeated German troops across Northern France. 73rd LAA Regiment reverted to mobile operations, with two towed and one SP battery, supported by the 30 three-tonner lorries of 1573 Platoon Royal Army Service Corps (RASC). On 3 September the regiment was ordered to guard the crossings of the River Seine, with one battery at Les Andelys and two at Louviers, where 15th (Scottish) Infantry Division had crossed on 28 August and the engineers had established Bailey bridges. I Corps captured Le Havre during Operation Astonia on 10–12 September, and 73rd LAA Rgt joined the AA defences of the town on 22 September, where it came under operational command of 103rd AA Bde. The regiment's own transport platoon and 1573 Pln RASC then returned to help move up 4th Royal Marines LAA Rgt, which had just landed at Cherbourg Harbour, driving 1000 miles in total.

== Belgium ==
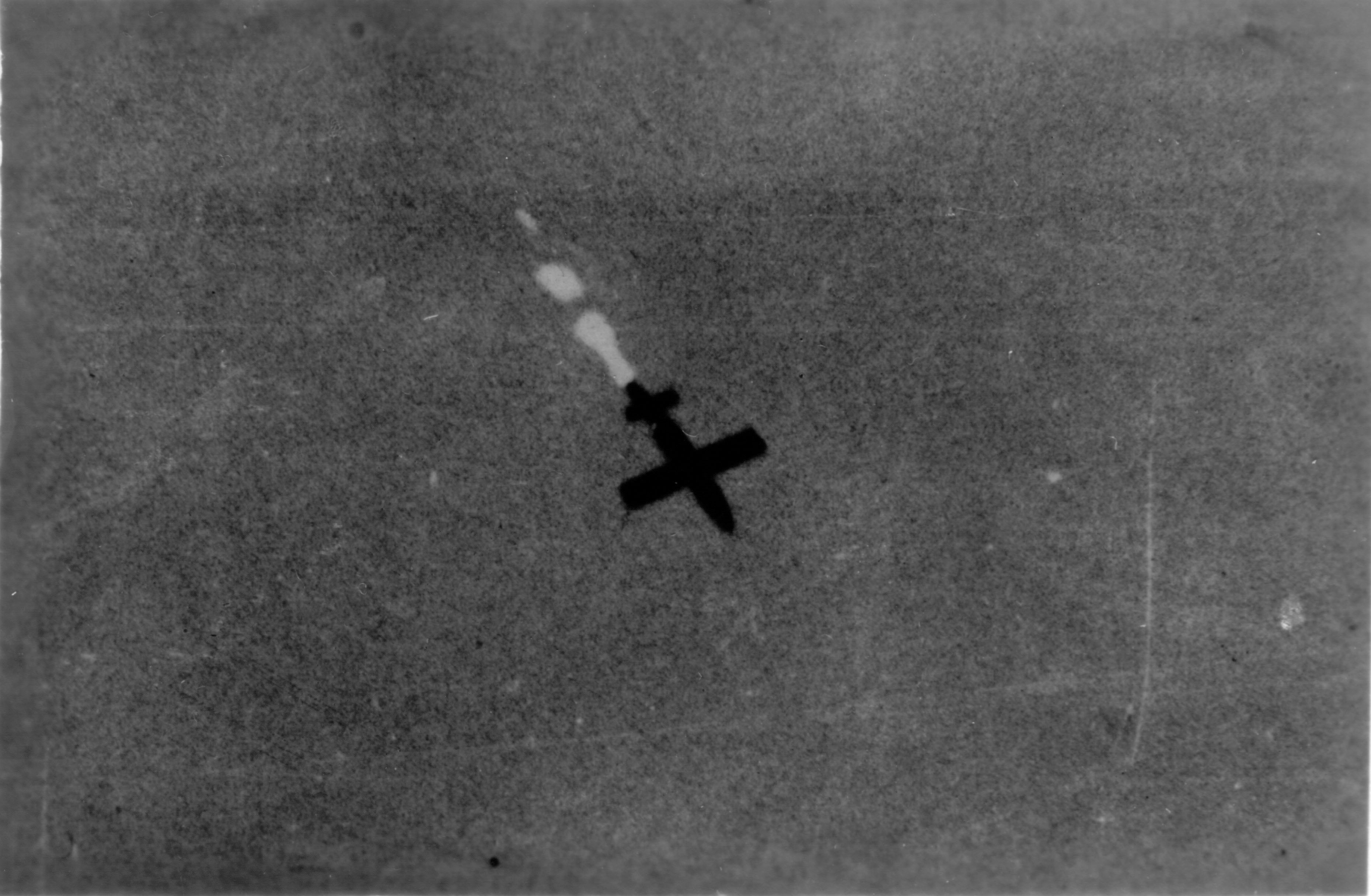
V-1 in flight over Antwerp

73rd LAA Regiment was withdrawn from Le Havre on 14 October and moved to Antwerp where it reverted to 80 AA Bde command once more. Clearing the Scheldt Estuary and bringing the port of Antwerp into use as a supply base was an important element in the Overlord plan. To deal not only with conventional air raids but also the threat of V-1 flying bombs (codenamed 'Divers'), the planners envisaged a large Gun Defence Area (GDA) integrated into a system ('Antwerp X' ) of warning stations and observation posts, supported by radar and searchlights. 73rd LAA Regiment was deployed and ready for action in the 'Antwerp X' belt on 17 October. Diver attacks began on 21 October against Brussels, and the first arrived at Antwerp two days later. At Antwerp the regiment was under the operational control of the US 56th AA Artillery Brigade.

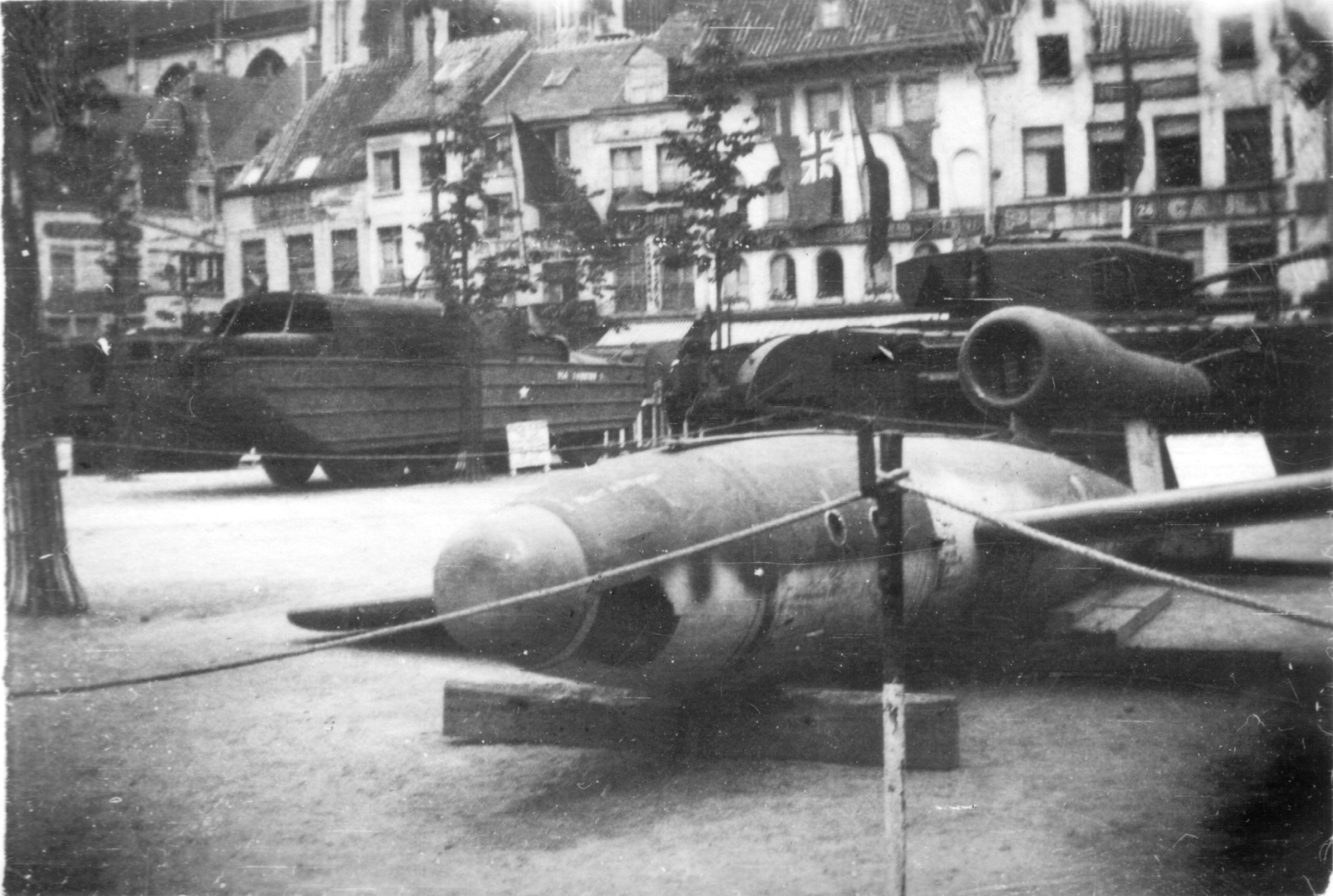
Captured V-1 displayed at Antwerp at the end of World War II.

73rd LAA Rgt moved to join the 'Brussels X' defences on 5 November under the operational command of 101st AA Brigade while 80th AA Bde operated the early warning radar system. 220/73 Battery was detached and joined 75th AA Brigade at Ostend on 15 November. Here the threat was not from air raids, but E-boats attacking shipping in the anchorage. 218th and 220th Batteries later moved up the southern side of the Scheldt Estuary under 5th Royal Marine AA Brigade in December, becoming part of the defences against aircraft dropping Parachute mines in the approaches to Antwerp Docks and the Ghent canal. With 296th Battery returning to the Antwerp X defences, and the REME Workshop at the Scheldt, RHQ ended the year with no units under its direct command.

On 1 January 1945, the Luftwaffe launched Operation Bodenplatte: daylight attacks by single-engined fighters against Allied airfields and lines of communication in support of the Ardennes offensive. 220th Battery was in the middle of a move to Knokke and only had five guns deployed, but claimed five Category I 'kills', and the Battery HQ of 296th Bty claimed another with Bren gun fire; 218th Bty were awarded a Category II claim. RHQ and 296th Bty rejoined 220th Bty at Knokke under 75th AA Bde in early January; 218th Bty remained detached under 5th RM AA Bde. On 12 March 1945 Lt-Col Armstrong relinquished command of the regiment after four years and the second-in-command, Major C.J. Lemon, was promoted to replace him.

== Disbandment ==
As the Allied forces advanced into Germany the air threat dwindled. 73rd LAA Regiment was deemed surplus to requirements and on 17 April the batteries were relieved of their commitments and the regiment concentrated south of Bruges. It was ordered to disband on 3 May and men and equipment began to be dispersed to other units; final disbandment was completed on 16 June 1945.

== External sources ==
- Royal Artillery 1939–1945
