= Henry Edward Kendall Jr. =

British architect

Henry Edward Kendall
- Born: 1805
- Died: 9 June 1885 (aged 79–80); Paddington
- Occupation: Architect
- Parent: Henry Edward Kendall
- Buildings: Knebworth House, Pope's Villa, Shuckburgh Hall, Kilmorey Mausoleum

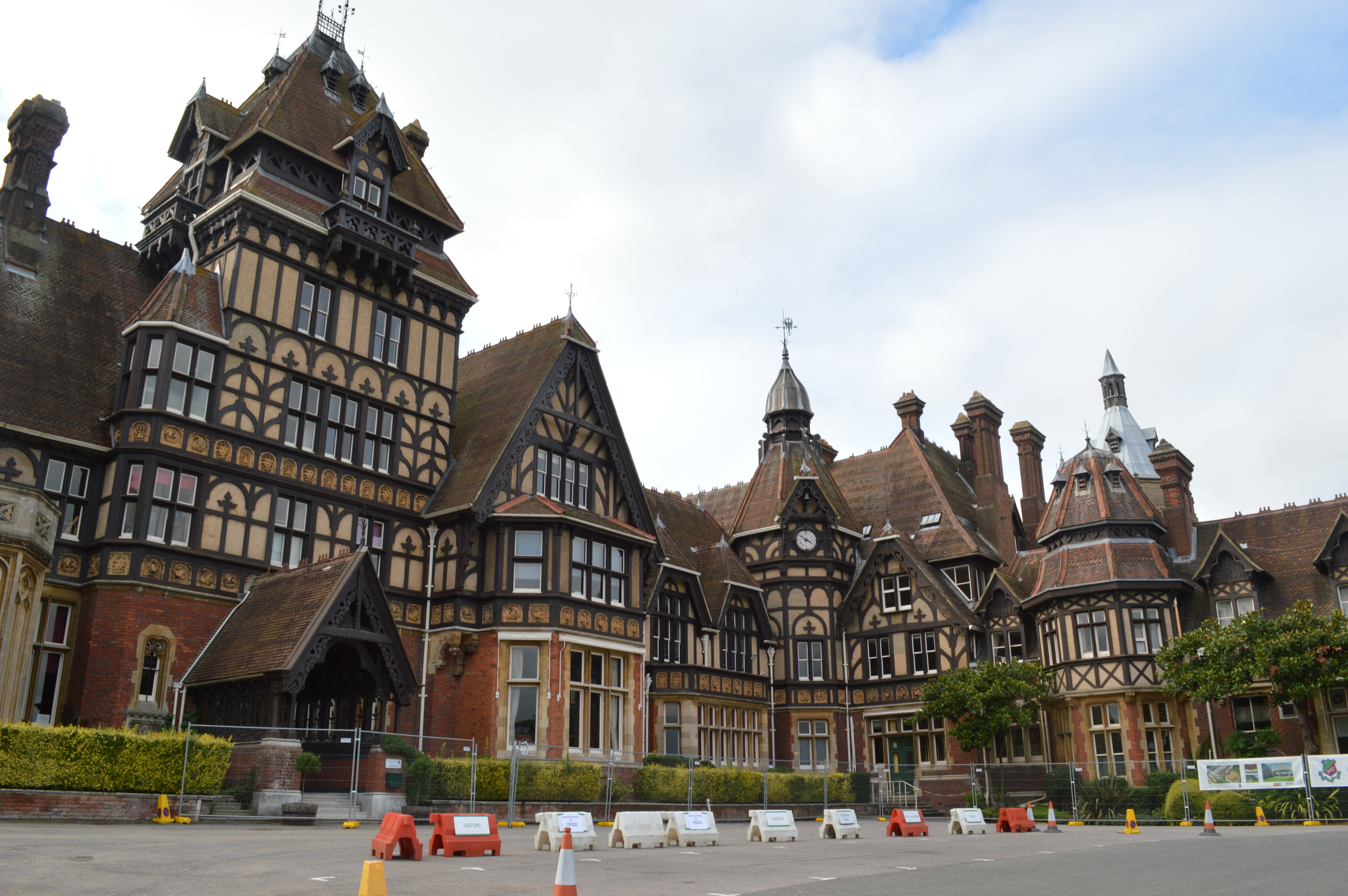
Farnborough Hill

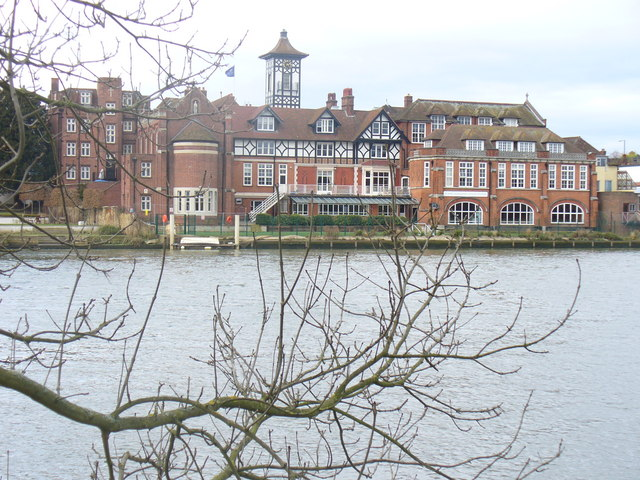
Kendall's Pope's Villa, now a private school, seen from across the Thames

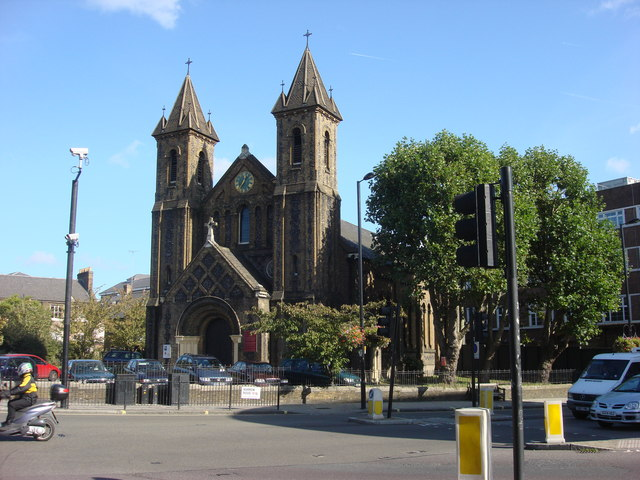
Church of St. John the Evangelist, Kensal Green

Henry Edward Kendall Junior (1805–9 June 1885) was a British architect.

== Background ==
Kendall was the son of Henry Edward Kendall, also an architect. Both were among the co-founders of what became the Royal Institute of British Architects.

== Early career ==
The two initially shared a practice, which in 1834 was located at 17 Suffolk Street, London. The Esplanade and Tunnel in Kemp Town, Brighton, dating between 1828 and 1830, was one of their notable works. Lewis Cubitt was amongst those who worked at the practice before setting up on his own.

== Many works ==
Kendall's works included schools, a few churches including the round-arched church of St John, Harrow Road, Kensal Green (1844), parsonages, two lunatic asylums (Herrison Hospital and St Francis Hospital) and many houses including the remodelling of Knebworth House (1843), Shuckburgh Hall (1844), 'Pope's Villa', Twickenham (built c. 1845 on the site of Alexander Pope's house, which had been demolished in 1808/09), and a house in Farnborough, Hampshire, built in 1860 for publisher Thomas Longman, subsequently home of Empress Eugénie of France and, since 1927, home to Farnborough Hill Girls School. He also designed the mausoleum of the 2nd Earl of Kilmorey and his mistress, built in Brompton Cemetery, London, in 1854, then relocated to Woburn Park, Chertsey in 1862, and moved to Isleworth in 1870. He was District Surveyor for Hampstead from 1844 and produced a book on school designs. Elsewhere in London he designed the Stonebridge Park Estate (originally intended to be called Harlesdon Park), a select estate of detached and semi-detached houses, two of which survive (though one is currently under threat of demolition by Brent Council). A view of the projected estate, showing a church that was in fact never built, depicts an idealised Victorian middle-class suburb. The estate was advertised by its developers as follows: "The aspect is South and South West overlooking 30 miles of beautiful country and THE SURREY HILLS. The surrounding lands are the property of large landholders or Ecclesiastical Corporations thus rendering it certain that no small houses or nuisances will be built in the neighbourhood ... It is proposed that Gates and Lodges shall be erected and the roads kept quite private ... this will render the Park like a Private Garden and will ... effectually Prevent all beggars, and similar annoyances, and all those little petty thefts and injuries which are so vexatious, and which are so frequently committed in the gardens and out-buildings in the neighbourhood of the Metropolis". By 1876 over 60 "smart new villas" had been built, along with the large 'Stonebridge Park Hotel'. Stonebridge Park became the home of many of the men who ran the Willesden Urban District's local government. Towards the end of his career, Kendall established a practice with his son-in-law, Frederick Mew.

== Paintings ==
Kendall exhibited paintings of architectural subjects at the Royal Academy between 1827 and 1862.

== Death ==
He died in 1885 in Paddington, aged 79.
