= Kilmorey Mausoleum =

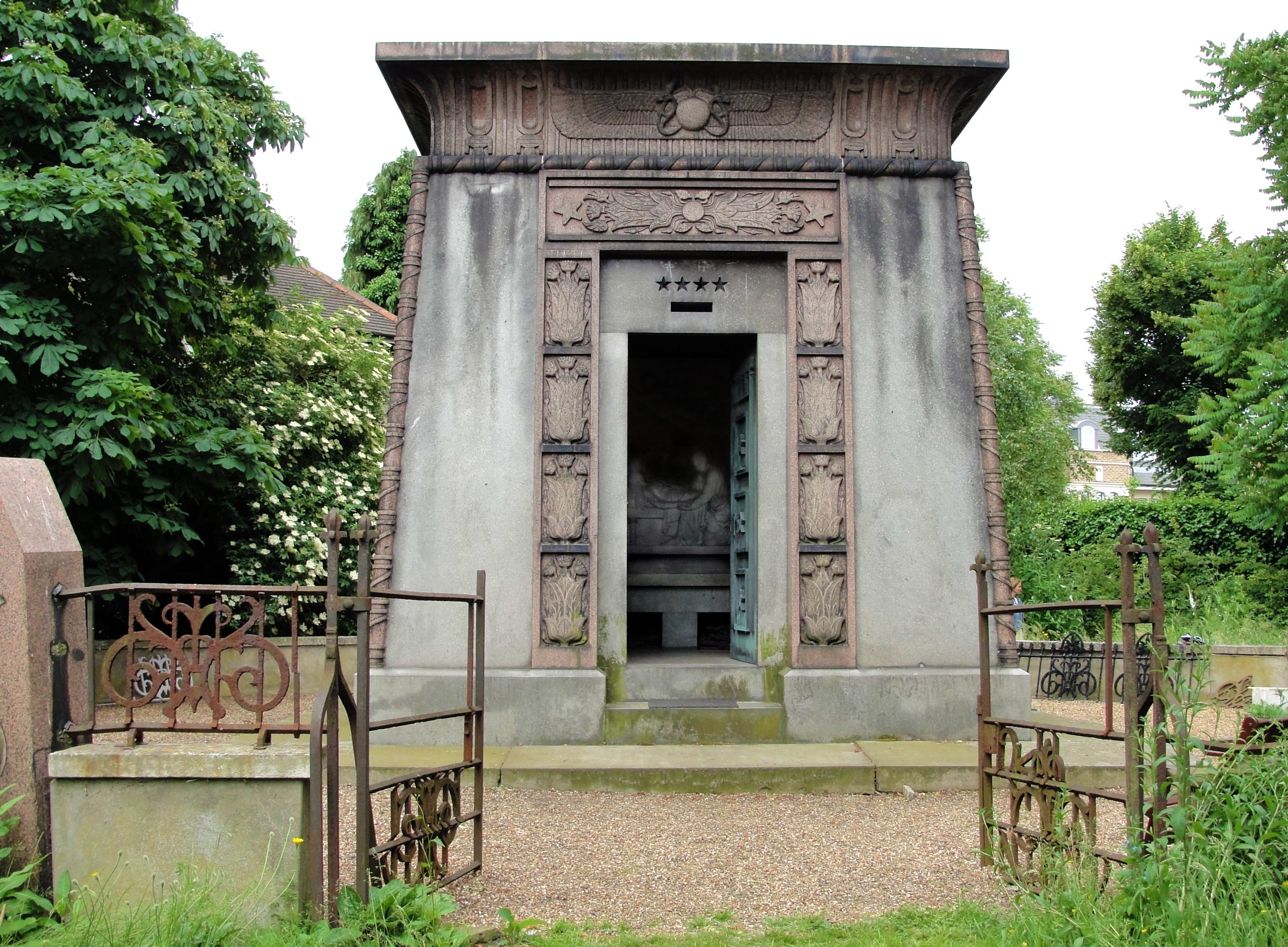
- Entrance to the Kilmorey Mausoleum
- Interactive map of the Kilmorey Mausoleum area

General information
- Type: Mausoleum
- Architectural style: Egyptian Revival
- Location: St Margarets Road, St Margarets, London Borough of Richmond upon Thames, England
- Coordinates: 51°27′40″N 0°19′22″W
- Construction started: c. 1853
- Owner: Richmond upon Thames Borough Council

Design and construction
- Designations: Grade II*

Other information
- Number of rooms

Listed Building – Grade II*
- Official name: The Kilmorey Mausoleum, including enclosure wall, railings and gate
- Designated: 3 November 1995
- Reference no.: 1240128

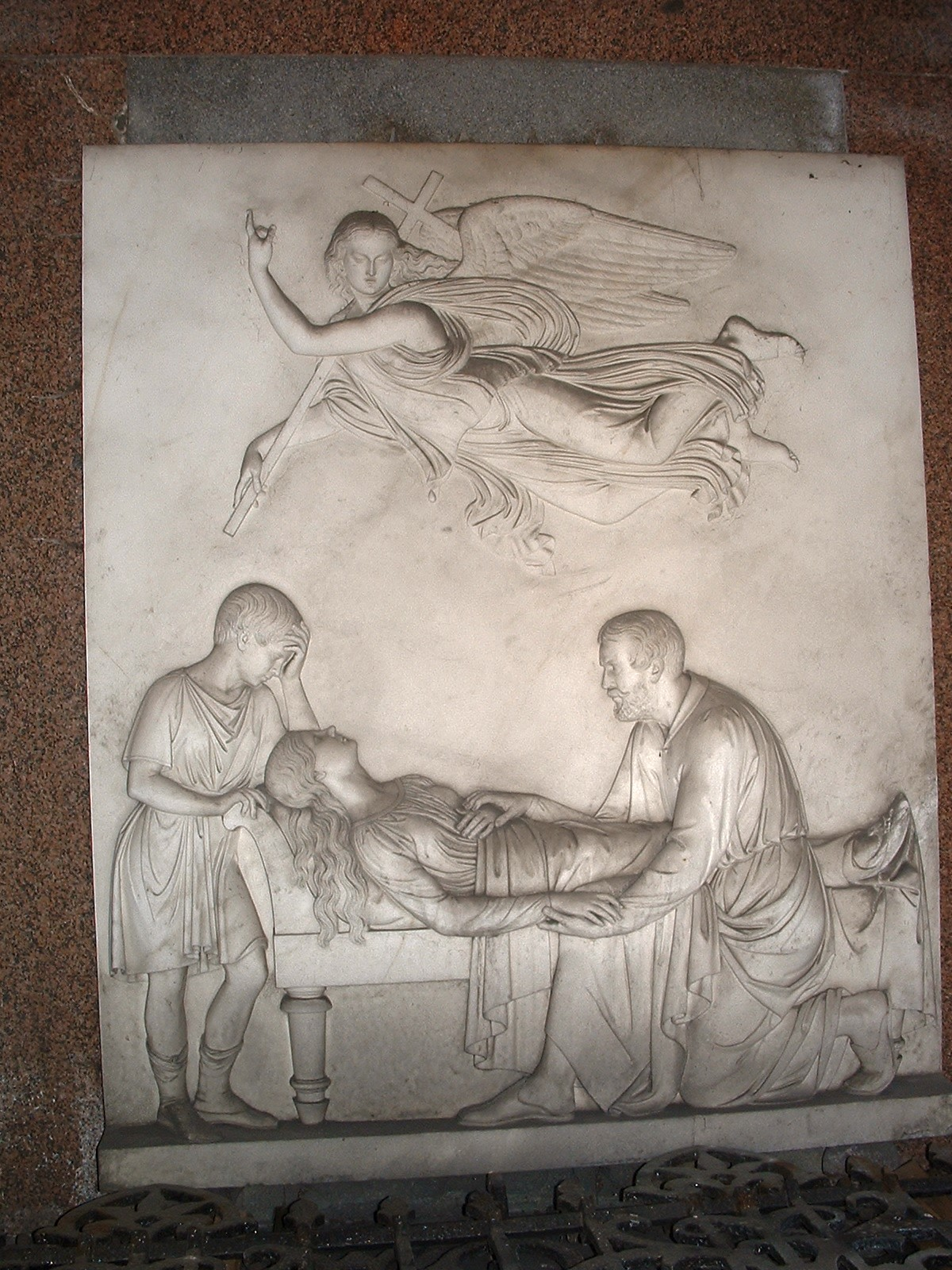
White marble relief

The Kilmorey Mausoleum, in St Margarets in the London Borough of Richmond upon Thames, is a Grade II* listed mausoleum in the style of an ancient Egyptian monument and has been described as a "fine example of an Egyptian-style mausoleum, with an unusually good interior". Designed by Henry Edward Kendall Jr. (1805–1885) and built, at a cost of £30,000, in pink and grey granite with a bronze door, it was commissioned in the 1850s by the 2nd Earl of Kilmorey (1787–1880) and contains the bodies of the Earl and his mistress, Priscilla Anne Hoste (1823–1854).

Priscilla died of heart disease on 21 October 1854, and she was buried in the mausoleum, with the inscription "Priscilla, the beloved of Francis Jack, Earl of Kilmorey".

When Kilmorey himself died in June 1880, aged 92, he was buried beside her in the mausoleum underneath a bas-relief in white marble showing the dying Priscilla on a couch surrounded by her lover and ten-year-old son Charles (b. 1844). The bas-relief was carved in Rome by portrait sculptor Lawrence Macdonald.

== Location and ownership ==
Originally erected in Brompton Cemetery, the mausoleum was moved first to Woburn Park near Weybridge in about 1862, and from there to its present location in about 1868.

In 1936 the grounds of the mausoleum were passed on in perpetuity to Hounslow Borough Council on condition that access would be maintained. Following changes to the Hounslow/ Richmond local borough boundaries in 1994, the mausoleum became the responsibility of Richmond upon Thames London Borough Council.

== The mausoleum today ==
The mausoleum, including the enclosure wall, railings and gate, are Grade II* listed and are on Historic England's At Risk Register. The surrounding cast iron railings, which in contrast to the building's Egyptian revival theme, are in a Gothic revival style, are in a poor condition and discussions on sources of grant funding are underway.

Situated in a wildlife site of about a third of an acre, the mausoleum is run and maintained entirely by volunteers, with assistance from Habitats & Heritage, and a contribution from Richmond upon Thames Council and English Heritage. Since 2001, the Mausoleum has been opened annually for events such as Open House.
