= St Francis Hospital, Haywards Heath =

St Francis Hospital
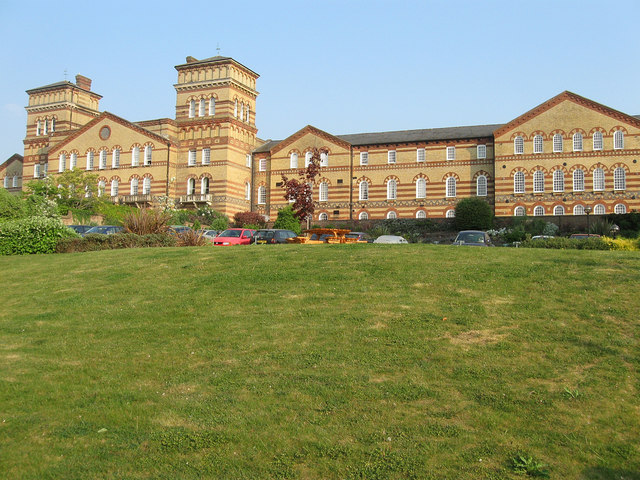
- St Francis Hospital, Haywards Heath

- Shown in West Sussex

Geography
- Location: Hayward's Heath, England
- Coordinates: 50.9893°N 0.0967°W

Organisation
- Care system: NHS
- Type: Specialist

Services
- Speciality: Mental health

History
- Founded: 1859
- Closed: 1995

Links
- Lists: Hospitals in England

St Francis Hospital was a mental health facility in Haywards Heath, West Sussex, England. The main building survives and is a Grade II listed building.

== History ==
The hospital, which was designed by Henry Edward Kendall Jr. in the Italianate style using a corridor plan layout, opened as the Sussex County Asylum in July 1859. An extra storey was added to the ward blocks in 1864. It became the Brighton County Borough Asylum in 1903 and the Brighton County Borough Mental Hospital in 1919 before joining the National Health Service as St Francis Hospital in 1948.

After the introduction of Care in the Community in the early 1980s, the hospital went into a period of decline and part of the site was made available to facilitate the construction of the Princess Royal Hospital in the late 1980s. St Francis Hospital briefly became the west wing of the Princess Royal Hospital in 1992 but closed completely in November 1995. The site was subsequently developed for residential use as Southdowns Park.
