= Adolphus Croft =

British architect (1831–1893)

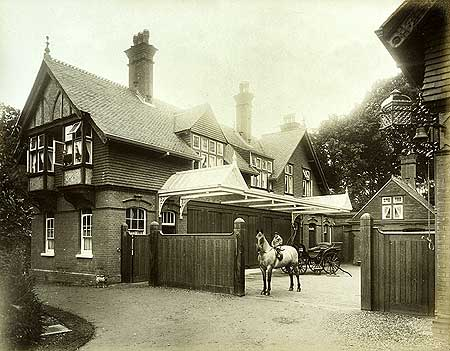
South Park stables, Wadhurst, East Sussex

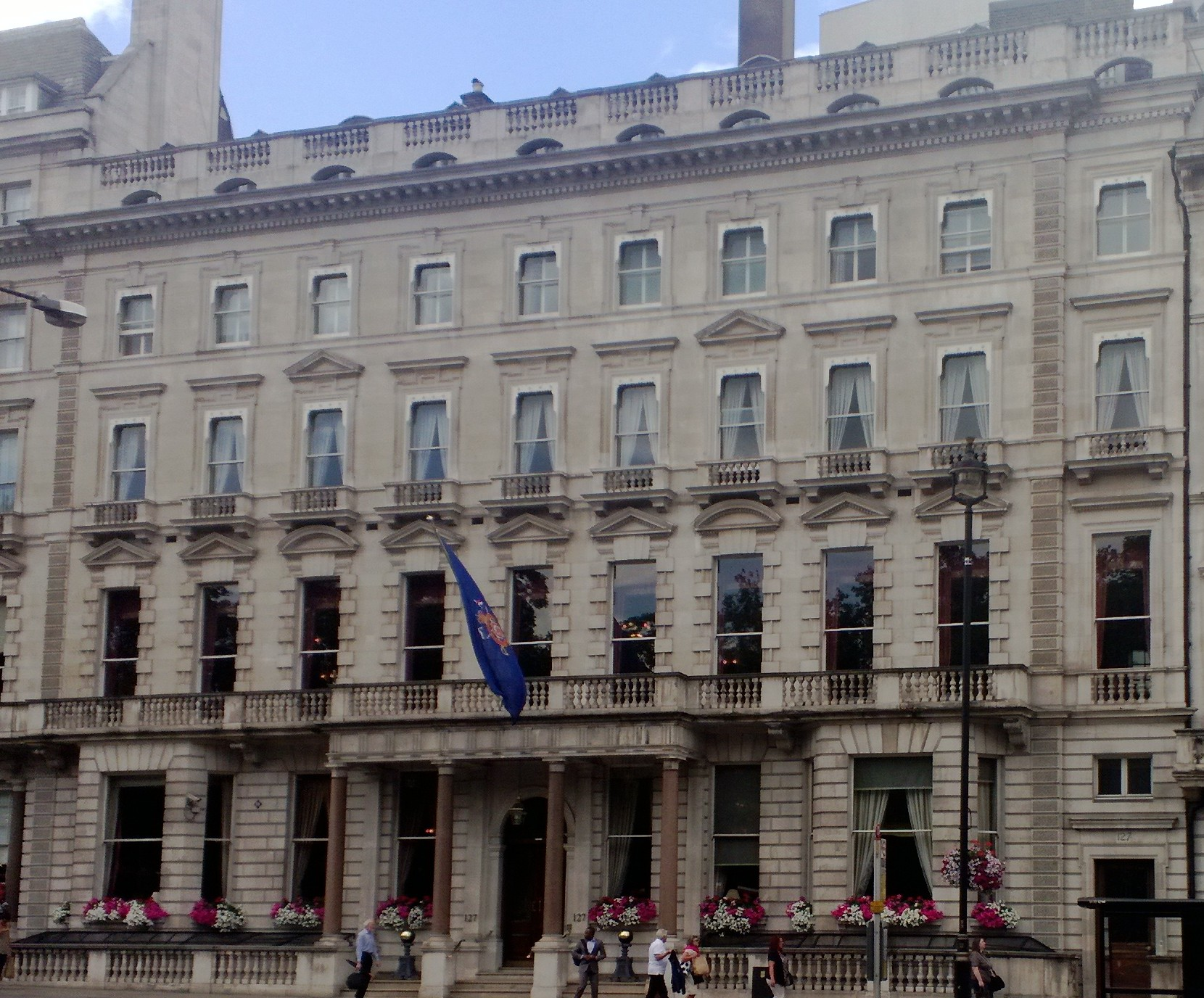
The Cavalry & Guards Club, 127 Piccadilly, London

Adolphus Croft (1831 – 22 March 1893) was the in-house architect for the furniture manufacturers Gillow & Company, later Waring & Gillow.

== Early life ==
Adolphus Croft was born in 1831 John Croft and Emma Croft. At the time of the 1861 census, the family were living at 26 Wellington Street, Islington, London. The census of that year records that Adolphus had brothers Arthur (1828) and John (1841) who were artists, and a sister Jessy (1841).

== Career ==
Croft designed South Park in East Sussex, later known as Wadhurst College, which with its stable block are both grade II listed with Historic England.

He designed Carlyle House, Chelsea Embankment, London which The Building News and Engineering Journal described as "rather too broken up to be deemed a pleasing example of the style it reproduces".

In 1888 he built three mansions at 127 and 128 Piccadilly, London.

He died at South Park on 22 March 1893.
