= Shuckburgh baronets =

Title in the Baronetage of England

The Shuckburgh Baronetcy, of Shuckburgh in the County of Warwick, is a title in the Baronetage of England. It was created on 25 June 1660 for John Shuckburgh, the eldest son of Sir Richard Shuckburgh, (1594–1656) Member of Parliament for Warwickshire and a supporter of the Royalist cause in the Civil War, who was knighted before the Battle of Edgehill by Charles I.

His son was raised to the baronetcy on the Restoration of Charles II of England. His son, the second Baronet, was High Sheriff of Warwickshire in 1687 and sat as Member of Parliament for Warwickshire 1698–1705. The fifth also served as High Sheriff in 1769. He was succeeded by his son, the sixth Baronet in 1773. He was a politician, mathematician and astronomer. He assumed the additional surname of Evelyn because his second wife Julia Annabella Evelyn was a distant relative of the diarist John Evelyn, whose closer line of inheritance had died out. However, as he was succeeded by his younger brother, the surname Evelyn was not retained by any of his successors. The eleventh Baronet also served as High Sheriff of Warwickshire in 1921. As of 2014 the title is held by the fourteenth Baronet, who succeeded his father in 2012.

Basil Shuckburgh, younger son of the eleventh Baronet, a Lieutenant in the King's Royal Rifle Corps, was killed in action in Crete in 1941. He served as a Major in the 11th City of London Yeomanry and was a Justice of the Peace for Warwickshire.

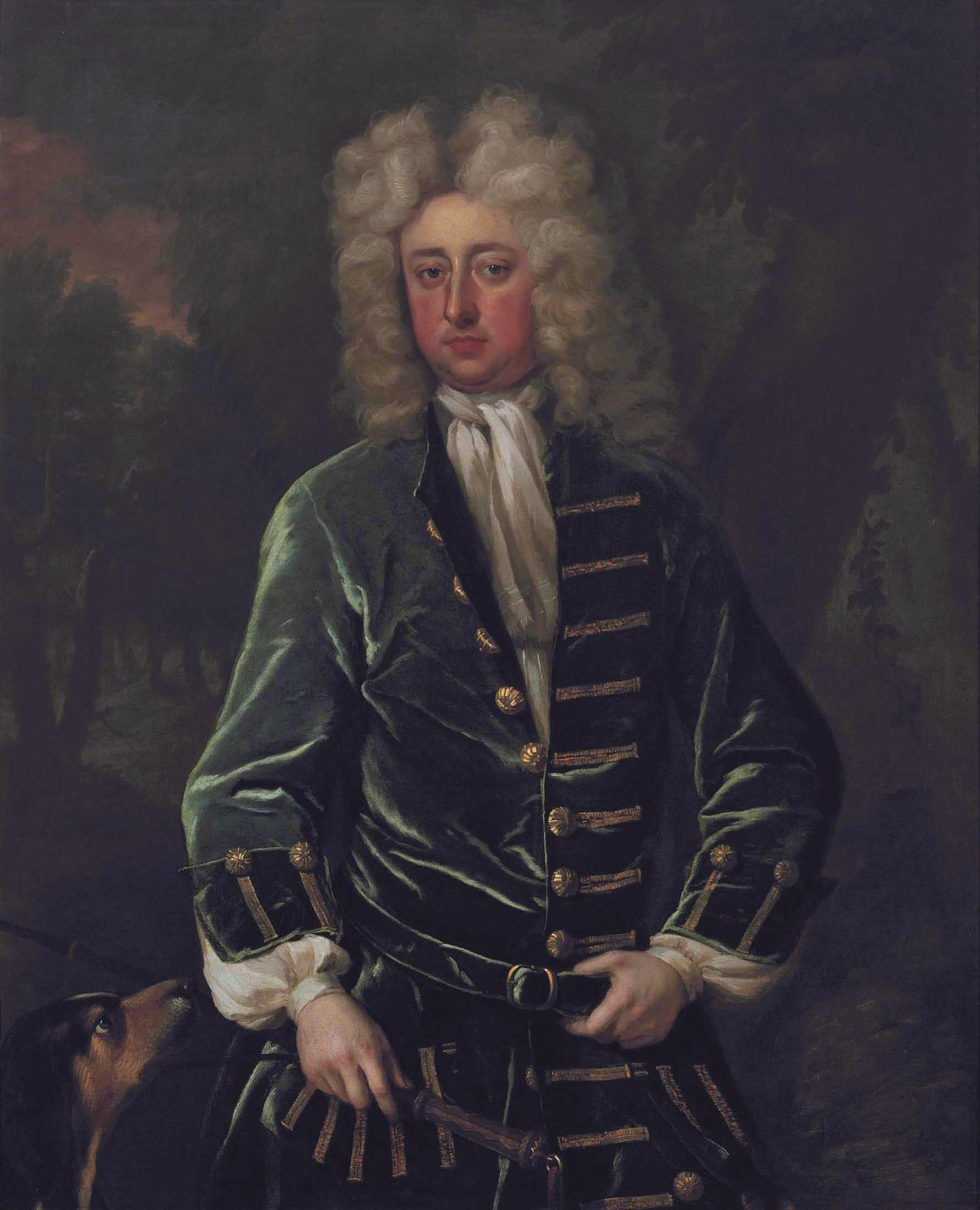
Sir Charles Shuckburgh, 2nd Baronet

The Shuckburgh family take their name from the Warwickshire village in which they settled in the 12th century. In the female line ancestors include William I and Adam de Napton from Lucia (Lucy) de Beauchamp (the daughter of Guy de Beauchamp 10th earl of Warwick) who married Robert de Napton, Knt. who was the son of Sir Adam Napton. Lucia and Sir Robert had a son Adam Napton; he married Margaret Helier

The family seat is Shuckburgh Hall at Lower Shuckburgh, Warwickshire.

== Shuckburgh baronets, of Shuckburgh, Warwickshire (1660) ==
Escutcheon of the Shuckburgh baronets

- Sir John Shuckburgh, 1st Baronet (1635–1661)
- Sir Charles Shuckburgh, 2nd Baronet (1659–1705)
- Sir John Shuckburgh, 3rd Baronet (1683–1724)
- Sir Stewkley Shuckburgh, 4th Baronet (1711–1759)
- Sir Charles Shuckburgh, 5th Baronet (1722–1773)
- Sir George Shuckburgh-Evelyn, 6th Baronet (c. 1752–1804)
- Sir Stewkley Shuckburgh, 7th Baronet (c. 1760–1809)
- Sir Francis Shuckburgh, 8th Baronet (1789–1876)
- Sir George Thomas Francis Shuckburgh, 9th Baronet (1829–1884)
- Sir Stewkley Frederick Draycott Shuckburgh, 10th Baronet (1880–1917)
- Sir Gerald Francis Stewkley Shuckburgh, 11th Baronet (1882–1939).
- Sir Charles Gerald Stewkley Shuckburgh, 12th Baronet (1911–1988)
- Sir Rupert Charles Gerald Shuckburgh, 13th Baronet (1949–2012)
- Sir James Rupert Charles Shuckburgh, 14th Baronet (born 1978)

The heir presumptive is the present holder's brother Peter Gerald William Shuckburgh (born 1982).
