= Shuckburgh Hall =

Country house in Warwickshire, England

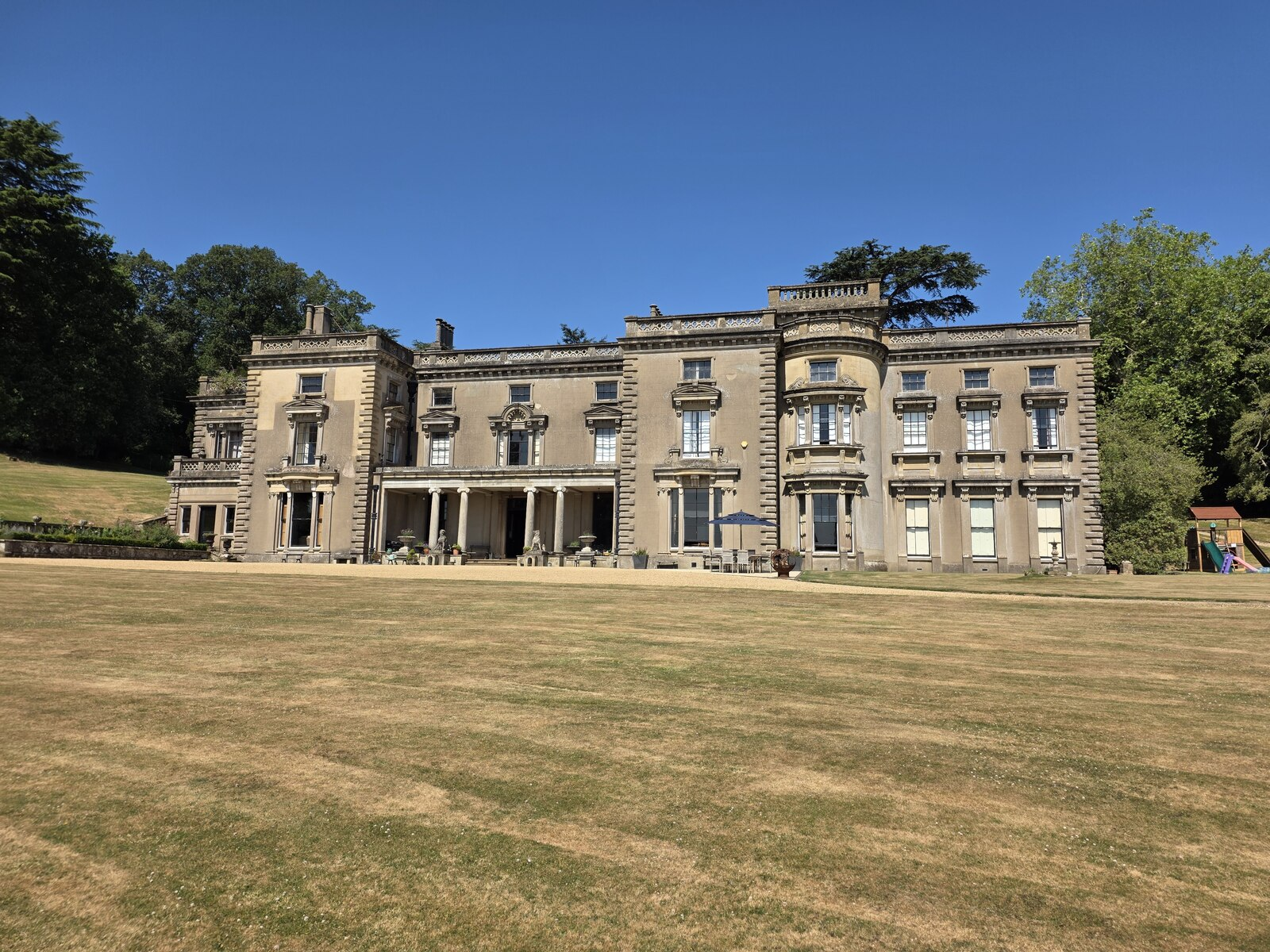
- Shuckburgh Hall in 2026
- Interactive map of Shuckburgh Hall
- 52.2526°N 1.2732°W
- Location: Upper Shuckburgh, Warwickshire, England

Site notes
- Architect: Henry Edward Kendall Jr.
- Architectural style: Italianate
- Owner: Sir James Rupert Charles Shuckburgh, 14th Baronet

Listed Building – Grade II*
- Official name: Shuckburgh Hall
- Designated: 7 January 1952
- Reference no.: 1024393

Shuckburgh Hall is a privately owned country house mansion at Upper Shuckburgh, Warwickshire, near to Daventry in Northamptonshire.

The estate has been the home of the Shuckburgh family since the 12th century. The house, which was granted Grade II* listed building status in January 1952, is not generally open to the public.

The house has its origins in the 14th and 15th centuries but has been much altered and extended over many years. The main front, designed by Henry Edward Kendall Jr. in an Italianate style, was built on to the old house in 1844.

Sir George Shuckburgh-Evelyn (1751–1804) placed an order with Jesse Ramsden for a telescope in 1781, and it was delivered ten years later. The telescope, known as the Shuckburgh telescope, was installed in his observatory at the hall and was moved after his death to the Royal Observatory, Greenwich in London by 1811. It was used there for over a century before being moved to the Science Museum, London, in 1927.

He also ordered a clock from John Arnold & Son to use with the telescope at this observatory.
