= Lower Shuckburgh =

Village in Warwickshire, England

Coordinates: 52.258133°N 1.289356°W

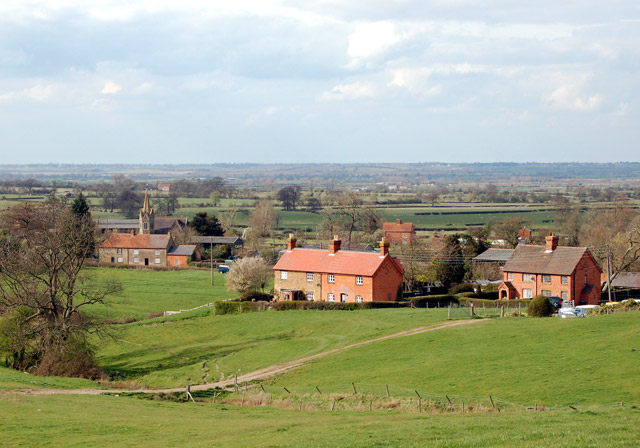
- Lower Shuckburgh from the south

- Location within Warwickshire
- Population: 82 (Upper and Lower Shuckburgh, 2001 Census)
- OS grid reference: SP4862
- Civil parish: Upper and Lower Shuckburgh
- District: Stratford-on-Avon
- Shire county: Warwickshire
- Region: West Midlands
- Country: England
- Sovereign state: United Kingdom
- Post town: DAVENTRY
- Postcode district: NN11
- Dialling code: 01327
- Police: Warwickshire
- Fire: Warwickshire
- Ambulance: West Midlands
- UK Parliament: Stratford-on-Avon

Lower Shuckburgh is a small village and former civil parish, now in the parish of Upper and Lower Shuckburgh, (which in the 2001 census had a population of 82) in the Stratford-on-Avon district, in eastern Warwickshire, England. In 1961 the parish had a population of 74. On 1 April 1988 the parish was abolished to form "Upper and Lower Shuckburgh".

The village lies on the A425 road between Southam and Daventry. Just north of the village is the Oxford Canal. On Beacon Hill, just south of the village, is the deserted village of Upper Shuckburgh after which the parish is partly named.

The most notable buildings in the village are the Church of St John the Baptist, designed by John Croft, which dates from 1864 and is built in Gothic style, and Shuckburgh Hall, a privately owned country house mansion, which has been the home of the Shuckburgh family since the 12th century. The 15 feet (5 m) war memorial is a Hornton stone obelisk, unveiled in 1921 and decorated with a bronze wreath of laurels.

Shuckburgh was mentioned in the Domesday Book as Sochberge, possibly referring to a long lost burial mound or barrow. The villages appear as Ouer Shugbury and Nether Shugbury on the Christopher Saxton map of 1637.

== Sources ==
- Allen, Geoff. (2000). Warwickshire Towns and Villages. Sigma Leisure. ISBN 1-85058-642-X
