= Baron Brooke =

Title in the Peerage of England

Baron Brooke is a title in the Peerage of England. It was created in 1621 and was absorbed into the Earldom of Warwick in 1759.

== History ==
The title was created in 1621 for Fulke Greville, who was already 5th Baron Willoughby de Broke. Greville was a favourite courtier of Queen Elizabeth and served under her and King James I as Treasurer of the Navy and as Chancellor of the Exchequer. He was also a poet and dramatist. Greville obtained from James I a grant of Warwick Castle, and in 1621 he was raised to the Peerage of England as Baron Brooke, of Beauchamps Court in the County of Warwick, with remainder to his second cousin (once removed), and adopted son, Robert Greville. Lord Brooke never married and on his death in 1628 the barony of Willoughby de Broke was passed on to his sister Margaret.

He was succeeded in the barony of Brooke according to the special remainder by Robert Greville, who became the second Baron. He was the grandson of Robert Greville, younger son of Sir Fulke Greville (d. 1569) and Elizabeth, 3rd Baroness Willoughby de Broke. He was a prominent Parliamentarian commander in the Civil War. Lord Brooke was killed during the siege of Lichfield Cathedral in 1643. His younger son, the fourth Baron, was one of the six commissioners deputed to invite the return of Charles II in 1660 and also served as Lord Lieutenant of Staffordshire. He outlived all of his six sons and was succeeded by his younger brother, the fifth Baron. He represented Warwick in the House of Commons. His grandson and successor, the sixth Baron, died from fever at an early age and was succeeded by his younger brother, the seventh Baron. His third but eldest surviving son, the eighth Baron, was Lord Lieutenant of Warwickshire. In 1746 he was created Earl Brooke, of Warwick Castle, in the Peerage of Great Britain. The earldom of Warwick created in 1618 for a member of the Rich family became extinct in September 1759, and in November of the same year Lord Brooke was created Earl of Warwick in the Peerage of Great Britain.

From this point the history of the barony was tied to the history of the Earldom of Warwick.

== Barons Brooke (1621) ==
- Fulke Greville, 1st Baron Brooke, 5th Baron Willoughby de Broke (1554–1628)
- Robert Greville, 2nd Baron Brooke (1607–1643)
- Francis Greville, 3rd Baron Brooke (d. 1658)
- Robert Greville, 4th Baron Brooke (c. 1638–1677)
- Fulke Greville, 5th Baron Brooke (1643–1710)
- Fulke Greville, 6th Baron Brooke (1693–1711)
- William Greville, 7th Baron Brooke (1695–1727)
- Francis Greville, 8th Baron Brooke (1719–1773) (created Earl Brooke in 1746 and Earl of Warwick in 1759)

See the earls of Warwick for further holders

== Family tree ==
Family tree of the peerages of Brooke, Holland, Kensington, and Warwick

Earl of Warwick (1st creation), 1088
Henry de Beaumont (d. 1119); 1st Earl of Warwick	William de Warenne (d. 1138); Earl of Surrey	Elizabeth de Vermandois (c. 1085–1131); Countess of Leicester
Roger de Beaumont (c. 1102–1153); 2nd Earl of Warwick	Gundred de Warenne
William de Beaumont (bef. 1140–1184); 3rd Earl of Warwick	Waleran de Beaumont (d. 1204); 4th Earl of Warwick
Henry de Beaumont (c. 1192-1229); 5th Earl of Warwick	Lady Alice de Newburgh
Thomas de Beaumont (1208–1242); 6th Earl of Warwick	m1. John Marshal (d. 1242); 7th Earl of Warwick jure uxoris	Margaret de Beaumont (d. 1242); 7th Countess of Warwick suo jure	m2. John du Plessis (d. 1263); 7th Earl of Warwick jure uxoris	Isabel de Mauduit	William Mauduit (c. 1221–1268); 8th Earl of Warwick
William de Beauchamp (c. 1238–1298); 9th Earl of Warwick
Guy de Beauchamp (c. 1272–1315); 10th Earl of Warwick
Thomas Beauchamp (c. 1313–1369); 11th Earl of Warwick
Thomas Beauchamp (1338–1401); 12th Earl of Warwick
Richard Beauchamp (1382–1439); 13th Earl of Warwick
Duke of Warwick, 1445
Margaret Beauchamp (1404–1467); Countess of Shrewsbury	Henry Beauchamp (1425–1446); Duke of Warwick, 14th Earl of Warwick	Richard of York (1411–1460); Duke of York	Anne Beauchamp (1426–1492); 16th Countess of Warwick	Richard Neville "the Kingmaker" (1428–1471); 16th Earl of Warwick jure uxoris	Henry VI (1421–1471); King of England
Dukedom of Warwick extinct, 1446
John Talbot (1426–1453); 1st Viscount Lisle	Anne Beauchamp (1444–1449); 15th Countess of Warwick	George Plantagenet (1449–1478); Duke of Clarence	Isabel Neville (1451–1476); Duchess of Clarence	m2. Richard III (1452–1485); King of England	Anne Neville (1456–1485)	m1. Edward of Westminster (1453–1471); Prince of Wales
Elizabeth Talbot (d. 1487)	Edward Grey (d. 1492); 1st Viscount Lisle	Edward Plantagenet (1475–1499); 17th Earl of Warwick
Earldom of Warwick (1st creation) forfeit, 1499
Elizabeth Grey (c. 1482/1484–c. 1525/1526)
Earl of Warwick (2nd creation), 1547	Baron Rich of Leez, 1547; See also Rich family tree
John Dudley (c. 1502–1553); Duke of Northumberland, 1st Earl of Warwick	Richard Rich (1496–1567); 1st Baron Rich
Fulke Greville (d. 1559)	John Dudley (c. 1527–1554); 2nd Earl of Warwick	Ambrose Dudley (c. 1530–1590); 3rd Earl of Warwick	Robert Dudley (1532–1588); Earl of Leicester	Robert Rich (c. 1538–1581); 2nd Baron Rich
Earldom of Warwick (2nd creation) extinct, 1590
Earl of Warwick (3rd creation), 1618
Fulke Greville (1536–1606)	Robert Greville (?)	Robert Rich (1559–1619); 1st Earl of Warwick, 3rd Baron Rich
Baron Brooke of Beauchamps Court, 1621	Baron Kensington of Kensington in the County of Middlesex (1st creation), 1623; Earl of Holland, 1624
Fulke Greville (1554–1628) de jure 13th Baron Latimer, 5th Baron Willoughby de Broke, 1st Baron Brooke	Fulke Greville (1575–1632)	Robert Rich (1587–1658); 2nd Earl of Warwick, 4th Baron Rich	Henry Rich (1590–1649); 1st Earl of Holland, 1st Baron Kensington
Robert Greville (1607–1643); 2nd Baron Brooke	Lady Anne Rich (1604–1642); Countess of Manchester	Robert Rich (1611–1659); 3rd Earl of Warwick, 5th Baron Rich	Charles Rich (1623–1673); 4th Earl of Warwick, 6th Baron Rich
Francis Greville (bef. 1637–1658); 3rd Baron Brooke	Robert Greville (1639–1677); 4th Baron Brooke	Fulke Greville (1643–1710); 5th Baron Brooke	Lady Anne Montagu (d. c. 1689)	Robert Rich (1620–1675); 5th Earl of Warwick, 2nd Earl of Holland, 7th Baron Rich, 2nd Baron Kensington	Cope Rich (1634–1676)
Francis Greville (d. 1710)	Elizabeth Rich (d. 1725)	Edward Rich (1673–1701); 6th Earl of Warwick, 3rd Earl of Holland, 8th Baron Rich, 3rd Baron Kensington	Cope Rich (d. 1706)
Fulke Greville (c. 1693–1711); 6th Baron Brooke	William Greville (1695–1727); 7th Baron Brooke	Francis Edwardes (d. 1725)	Edward Henry Rich (1698–1721); 7th Earl of Warwick, 4th Earl of Holland, 9th Baron Rich, 4th Baron Kensington	Edward Rich (1695–1759); 8th Earl of Warwick, 5th Earl of Holland, 10th Baron Rich, 5th Baron Kensington
Earldoms of Warwick (3rd creation) and Holland extinct, 1759
Earl Brooke, 1746; Earl of Warwick (4th creation), 1759	Baron Kensington (Ireland)
Francis Greville (1719–1773); 1st Earl of Warwick, 1st Earl Brooke, 8th Baron Brooke	William Edwardes (c. 1711–1801); 1st Baron Kensington
George Greville (1746–1816); 2nd Earl of Warwick, 2nd Earl Brooke, 9th Baron Brooke
George Greville (1772–1786) styled Lord Brooke	Henry Richard Greville (1779–1853); 3rd Earl of Warwick, 3rd Earl Brooke, 10th Baron Brooke	William Edwardes (1777–1852); 2nd Baron Kensington
George Guy Greville (1818–1893); 4th Earl of Warwick, 4th Earl Brooke, 11th Baron Brooke	William Edwardes (1801–1872); 3rd Baron Kensington
Baron Kensington, of Kensington in the County of Middlesex (United Kingdom)
Francis Richard Charles Greville (1853–1924); 5th Earl of Warwick, 5th Earl Brooke, 12th Baron Brooke	William Edwardes (1835–1896); 4th/1st (Ire/UK) Baron Kensington
Leopold Guy Francis Maynard Greville (1882–1928); 6th Earl of Warwick, 6th Earl Brooke, 13th Baron Brooke	William Edwardes (1868–1900); 5th/2nd (Ire/UK) Baron Kensington	Hugh Edwardes (1873–1938); 6th/3rd (Ire/UK) Baron Kensington
Charles Guy Fulke Greville (1911–1984); 7th Earl of Warwick, 7th Earl Brooke, 14th Baron Brooke	William Edwardes (1904–1981); 7th/4th (Ire/UK) Baron Kensington	Hugh Owen Edwardes (1905–1937)
David Robin Francis Guy Greville (1934–1996); 8th Earl of Warwick, 8th Earl Brooke, 15th Baron Brooke	Hugh Ivor Edwardes (1933–2018); 8th/5th (Ire/UK) Baron Kensington
Guy David Greville (b. 1957); 9th Earl of Warwick, 9th Earl Brooke, 16th Baron Brooke	William Owen Alexander Edwardes (b. 1964); 9th/6th (Ire/UK) Baron Kensington
Charles Fulke Chester Greville (b. 1982) styled Lord Brooke	William Francis Ivor Edwardes (b. 1993)
Heir apparent to the earldom of Warwick and the earldom of Brooke	Heir apparent to the baronies of Kensington

== See also ==
- Baron Brooke of Alverthorpe
- Baron Brooke of Cumnor
- Baron Brooke of Oakley
- Baron Brooke of Sutton Mandeville
- Baroness Brooke of Ystradfellte
- Brooke baronets
