= Earl of Holland =

Former title in the Peerage of England

Earldom of Holland
- Arms of Rich: Gules, a chevron between three crosses botonée or
- Creation date: 1624
- Created by: King James I
- Peerage: Peerage of England
- First holder: Henry Rich, 1st Earl of Holland
- Last holder: Edward Rich, 5th Earl of Holland

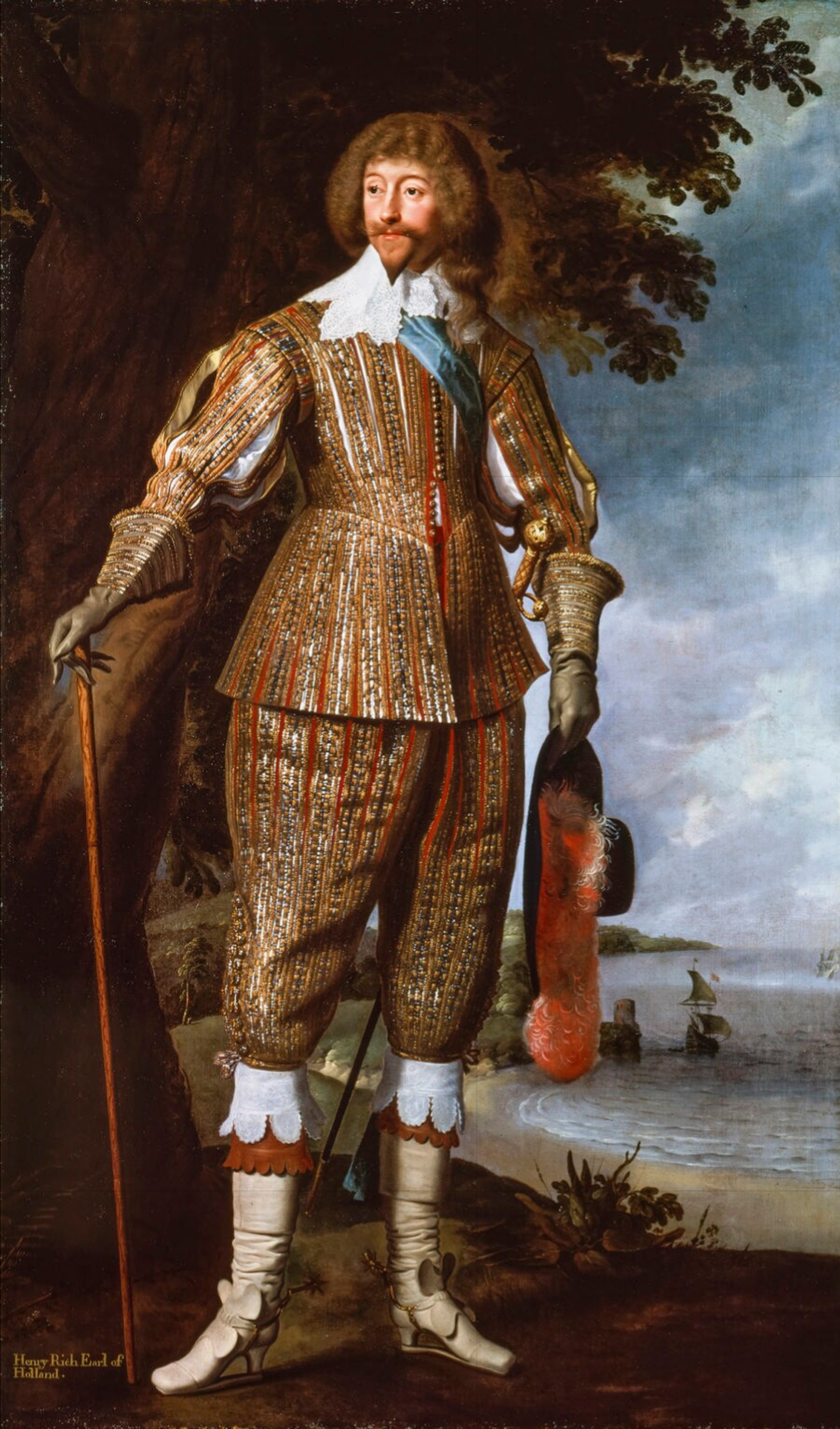
Henry, 1st Earl of Holland.

Earl of Holland was a title in the Peerage of England. It was created in 1624 for Henry Rich, 1st Baron Kensington. He was the younger son of Robert Rich, 1st Earl of Warwick, and had already been created Baron Kensington in 1623, also in the Peerage of England, having married Isabelle Cope, daughter and sole heiress of Sir Walter Cope (c.1553-1614), of Cope Castle in Kensington, Middlesex. His eldest son, the second Earl, succeeded his first cousin as fifth Earl of Warwick in 1673. All the titles became extinct on the death of the eighth Earl of Warwick and fifth Earl of Holland in 1759 (see Earl of Warwick for a more detailed description of the descent of the titles).

Lady Mary Rich, daughter of the first Earl of Holland, married Sir John Campbell, 5th Baronet, who was created Earl of Breadalbane and Holland in the Peerage of Scotland in 1681. Also, Lady Elizabeth Rich, only daughter and heiress of the fifth Earl of Warwick and second Earl of Holland, married Francis Edwardes. Their son William Edwardes succeeded to parts of the Rich estates and was created Baron Kensington in the Peerage of Ireland in 1776.

The name "Holland" in the title refers to the area of Lincolnshire historically known as Holland.

== Earls of Holland (1624) ==
- Henry Rich, 1st Earl of Holland (1590–1649)
- Robert Rich, 2nd Earl of Holland, 5th Earl of Warwick (c. 1620–1675)
  - Henry Rich, Lord Kensington (1642–1659)
- Edward Rich, 3rd Earl of Holland, 6th Earl of Warwick (1673–1701)
- Edward Henry Rich, 4th Earl of Holland, 7th Earl of Warwick (1697–1721)
- Edward Rich, 5th Earl of Holland, 8th Earl of Warwick (1695–1759)

Rich family tree

Baron Rich of Leez (England), 1547
Richard Rich; 1496/7–1567; 1st Baron Rich	Elizabeth Jenks; 1510–1558
Ann or Jane Machell b. 1557	Richard Rich (illegitimate) d. 1598	Robert Rich c. 1537–1581; 2nd Baron Rich	Elizabeth Baldry
Earl of Warwick (3rd creation, England), 1618
Robert Rich d. 1630	Nathaniel Rich; 1585–1636	Honora Worlick	Edwin Rich; 1561–1600	Robert Rich; 1559–1618; 1st Earl of Warwick, 3rd Baron Rich	Penelope Devereux; 1563–1607
Rich Baronet, of London (England), 1676	Baron Kensington (1st creation), 1623; Earl of Holland (England), 1624
Elizabeth Hampden d. 1655 (cousin of John Hampden)	Colonel Nathaniel Rich d. c. 1701	Edwin Rich; 1594–1675	Charles Rich c. 1619–1677; 1st Baronet	Elizabeth Cholmeley d. 1694	Robert Rich; 1587–1658; 2nd Earl of Warwick, 4th Baron Rich	Frances Hatton; 1590–1623	Isabella Rich b. c. 1590	Isabel Cope d. 1655	Henry Rich; 1590–1649; 1st Earl of Holland, etc.
Robert Rich c. 1648–1699; 2nd Baronet	Mary Rich d. 1714	Edward Montagu; 1602–1671; Earl of Manchester	Anne Rich; 1604–1641/42	Robert Rich; 1611–1659; 3rd Earl of Warwick, 5th Baron Rich	Mary Boyle; 1625–1678	Charles Rich; 1619–1673; 4th Earl of Warwick, 6th Baron Rich
Robert Montagu; 1634–1683; Earl of Manchester	Anne Montagu d. c. 1689	Robert Rich c. 1619–1675; 5th Earl of Warwick, 7th Baron Rich, 2nd Earl of Holland, etc.	James Thynne; 1605–1670	Isabella Rich; 1623–1670	John Campbell; 1636–1717; Earl of Breadalbane and Holland	Mary Rich; 1632–1666	Cope Rich; 1634–1676 (Spouse unknown)
Charles Rich c. 1680–1706; 3rd Baronet	Robert Rich; 1685–1768; 4th Baronet	Elizabeth Griffith b. c. 1692–1773	Charlotte Myddleton; 1680–1731 daughter of Thomas Myddelton)	Edward Rich; 1673–1701; 6th Earl of Warwick, 8th Baron Rich, 3rd Earl of Holland, etc.	Elizabeth Rich d. 1725	Francis Edwardes d. 1725	Earls of Breadalbane and Holland (Campbell family)	Cope Rich d. 1706 (Spouse unknown)
Baron Kensington (2nd creation, Ireland), 1776
Robert Rich; 1717–1785; 5th Baronet	George Rich; 1728–1799; 6th Baronet	Edward Henry Rich d. 1721; 7th Earl of Warwick, 9th Baron Rich, 4th Earl of Holland, etc.	Barons Kensington (Edwardes family)	Edward Henry Rich; 1695–1759; 8th Earl of Warwick, 10th Baron Rich, 5th Earl of Holland, etc.,
All English titles extinct, 1759

Warwick family tree including the peerages of Brooke, Holland, Kensington, and Warwick

Earl of Warwick (1st creation), 1088
Henry de Beaumont d. 1119; 1st Earl of Warwick	William de Warenne d. 1138; Earl of Surrey	Elizabeth de Vermandois c. 1085–1131; Countess of Leicester
Roger de Beaumont c. 1102–1153; 2nd Earl of Warwick	Gundred de Warenne
William de Beaumont (bef. 1140–1184); 3rd Earl of Warwick	Waleran de Beaumont d. 1204; 4th Earl of Warwick
Henry de Beaumont (c. 1192-1229); 5th Earl of Warwick	Alice de Newburgh
Thomas de Beaumont; 1208–1242; 6th Earl of Warwick	m1. John Marshal d. 1242; 7th Earl of Warwick jure uxoris	Margaret de Beaumont d. 1242; 7th Countess of Warwick suo jure	m2. John du Plessis d. 1263; 7th Earl of Warwick jure uxoris	Isabel de Mauduit	William Mauduit c. 1221–1268; 8th Earl of Warwick
William de Beauchamp c. 1238–1298; 9th Earl of Warwick
Guy de Beauchamp c. 1272–1315; 10th Earl of Warwick
Thomas Beauchamp c. 1313–1369; 11th Earl of Warwick
Thomas Beauchamp; 1338–1401; 12th Earl of Warwick
Richard Beauchamp; 1382–1439; 13th Earl of Warwick
Duke of Warwick, 1445
Margaret Beauchamp; 1404–1467	Henry Beauchamp; 1425–1446; Duke of Warwick, 14th Earl of Warwick	Richard of York; 1411–1460; Duke of York	Anne Beauchamp; 1426–1492; 16th Countess of Warwick	Richard Neville "the Kingmaker"; 1428–1471; 16th Earl of Warwick jure uxoris	Henry VI; 1421–1471; King of England
Dukedom of Warwick extinct, 1446
John Talbot; 1426–1453; Viscount Lisle	Anne Beauchamp; 1444–1449; 15th Countess of Warwick	George Plantagenet; 1449–1478; Duke of Clarence	Isabel Neville; 1451–1476	m2. Richard III; 1452–1485; King of England	Anne Neville; 1456–1485	m1. Edward of Westminster; 1453–1471; Prince of Wales
Elizabeth Talbot d. 1487	Edward Grey d. 1492; Viscount Lisle	Edward Plantagenet; 1475–1499; 17th Earl of Warwick
Earldom of Warwick (1st creation) forfeit, 1499
Elizabeth Grey c. 1482/1484–c. 1525/1526
Viscount Lisle (5th creation), 1542; Earl of Warwick (2nd creation), 1547	Baron Rich of Leez, 1547; See also Rich family tree
John Dudley c. 1502–1553; Duke of Northumberland, 1st Earl of Warwick, etc.	Richard Rich; 1496–1567; 1st Baron Rich
Fulke Greville d. 1559	John Dudley c. 1527–1554; 2nd Earl of Warwick, etc.	Ambrose Dudley c. 1530–1590; 3rd Earl of Warwick, etc.	Robert Dudley; 1532–1588; Earl of Leicester	Robert Rich c. 1538–1581; 2nd Baron Rich
Earldom of Warwick (2nd creation) and subsidiary title extinct, 1590
Earl of Warwick (3rd creation), 1618
Fulke Greville; 1536–1606	Robert Greville (?)	Robert Rich; 1559–1619; 1st Earl of Warwick, 3rd Baron Rich
Baron Brooke of Beauchamps Court, 1621	Baron Kensington of Kensington in the County of Middlesex (1st creation), 1623; Earl of Holland, 1624
Fulke Greville; 1554–1628 de jure 13th Baron Latimer, 5th Baron Willoughby de Broke, 1st Baron Brooke	Fulke Greville; 1575–1632	Robert Rich; 1587–1658; 2nd Earl of Warwick, 4th Baron Rich	Henry Rich; 1590–1649; 1st Earl of Holland, etc.
Robert Greville; 1607–1643; 2nd Baron Brooke	Anne Rich; 1604–1642; Countess of Manchester	Robert Rich; 1611–1659; 3rd Earl of Warwick, 5th Baron Rich	Charles Rich; 1623–1673; 4th Earl of Warwick, 6th Baron Rich
Francis Greville (bef. 1637–1658); 3rd Baron Brooke	Robert Greville; 1639–1677; 4th Baron Brooke	Fulke Greville; 1643–1710; 5th Baron Brooke	Anne Montagu (d. c. 1689)	Robert Rich; 1620–1675; 5th Earl of Warwick, 2nd Earl of Holland, etc., 7th Baron Rich	Cope Rich; 1634–1676
Francis Greville d. 1710	Elizabeth Rich d. 1725	Edward Rich; 1673–1701; 6th Earl of Warwick, 3rd Earl of Holland, etc., 8th Baron Rich	Cope Rich d. 1706
Fulke Greville c. 1693–1711; 6th Baron Brooke	William Greville; 1695–1727; 7th Baron Brooke	Francis Edwardes d. 1725	Edward Henry Rich; 1698–1721; 7th Earl of Warwick, 4th Earl of Holland, etc., 9th Baron Rich	Edward Rich; 1695–1759; 8th Earl of Warwick, 5th Earl of Holland, etc., 10th Baron Rich
Earldoms of Warwick (3rd creation) and Holland extinct, 1759
Earl Brooke, 1746; Earl of Warwick (4th creation), 1759	Baron Kensington (Ireland)
Francis Greville; 1719–1773; 1st Earl of Warwick, 1st Earl Brooke, 8th Baron Brooke	William Edwardes c. 1711–1801; 1st Baron Kensington
George Greville; 1746–1816; 2nd Earl of Warwick, 2nd Earl Brooke, 9th Baron Brooke
George Greville; 1772–1786 styled Lord Brooke	Henry Richard Greville; 1779–1853; 3rd Earl of Warwick, 3rd Earl Brooke, 10th Baron Brooke	William Edwardes; 1777–1852; 2nd Baron Kensington
George Guy Greville; 1818–1893; 4th Earl of Warwick, 4th Earl Brooke, 11th Baron Brooke	William Edwardes; 1801–1872; 3rd Baron Kensington
Baron Kensington, of Kensington in the County of Middlesex (United Kingdom)
Francis Richard Charles Greville; 1853–1924; 5th Earl of Warwick, 5th Earl Brooke, 12th Baron Brooke	William Edwardes; 1835–1896; 4th/1st (Ire/UK) Baron Kensington
Leopold Guy Francis Maynard Greville; 1882–1928; 6th Earl of Warwick, 6th Earl Brooke, 13th Baron Brooke	William Edwardes; 1868–1900; 5th/2nd (Ire/UK) Baron Kensington	Hugh Edwardes; 1873–1938; 6th/3rd (Ire/UK) Baron Kensington
Charles Guy Fulke Greville; 1911–1984; 7th Earl of Warwick, 7th Earl Brooke, 14th Baron Brooke	William Edwardes; 1904–1981; 7th/4th (Ire/UK) Baron Kensington	Hugh Owen Edwardes; 1905–1937
David Robin Francis Guy Greville; 1934–1996; 8th Earl of Warwick, 8th Earl Brooke, 15th Baron Brooke	Hugh Ivor Edwardes; 1933–2018; 8th/5th (Ire/UK) Baron Kensington
Guy David Greville b. 1957; 9th Earl of Warwick, 9th Earl Brooke, 16th Baron Brooke	William Owen Alexander Edwardes b. 1964; 9th/6th (Ire/UK) Baron Kensington
Charles Fulke Chester Greville b. 1982 styled Lord Brooke	William Francis Ivor Edwardes b. 1993
Heir apparent to the earldom of Warwick and the earldom of Brooke	Heir apparent to the baronies of Kensington

== See also ==
- Earl of Warwick (1618 creation)
- Earl of Breadalbane and Holland
- Baron Kensington
- Baron Holland
