= Earl of Warwick =

Title in the United Kingdom

Earldom of Warwick held with Earldom of Brooke
- Arms of Greville, Earls of Warwick: Sable, on a cross engrailed or five pellets a bordure engrailed of the second
- Creation date: 1088 (first creation); 1547 (second creation); 1618 (third creation); 1759 (fourth creation)
- Created by: William II (first creation); Edward VI (second creation); James VI and I (third creation); George II of Great Britain (fourth creation)
- Peerage: Peerage of Great Britain
- First holder: Henry de Beaumont
- Present holder: Guy Greville, 9th Earl of Warwick
- Heir apparent: Charles Greville, Lord Brooke
- Subsidiary titles: Earl Brooke; Baron Brooke
- Extinction date: 1499 (first creation); 1590 (second creation); 1759 (third creation)
- Former seat: Warwick Castle
- Motto: Vix ea nostra voco (Latin for "I scarcely call these things our own")

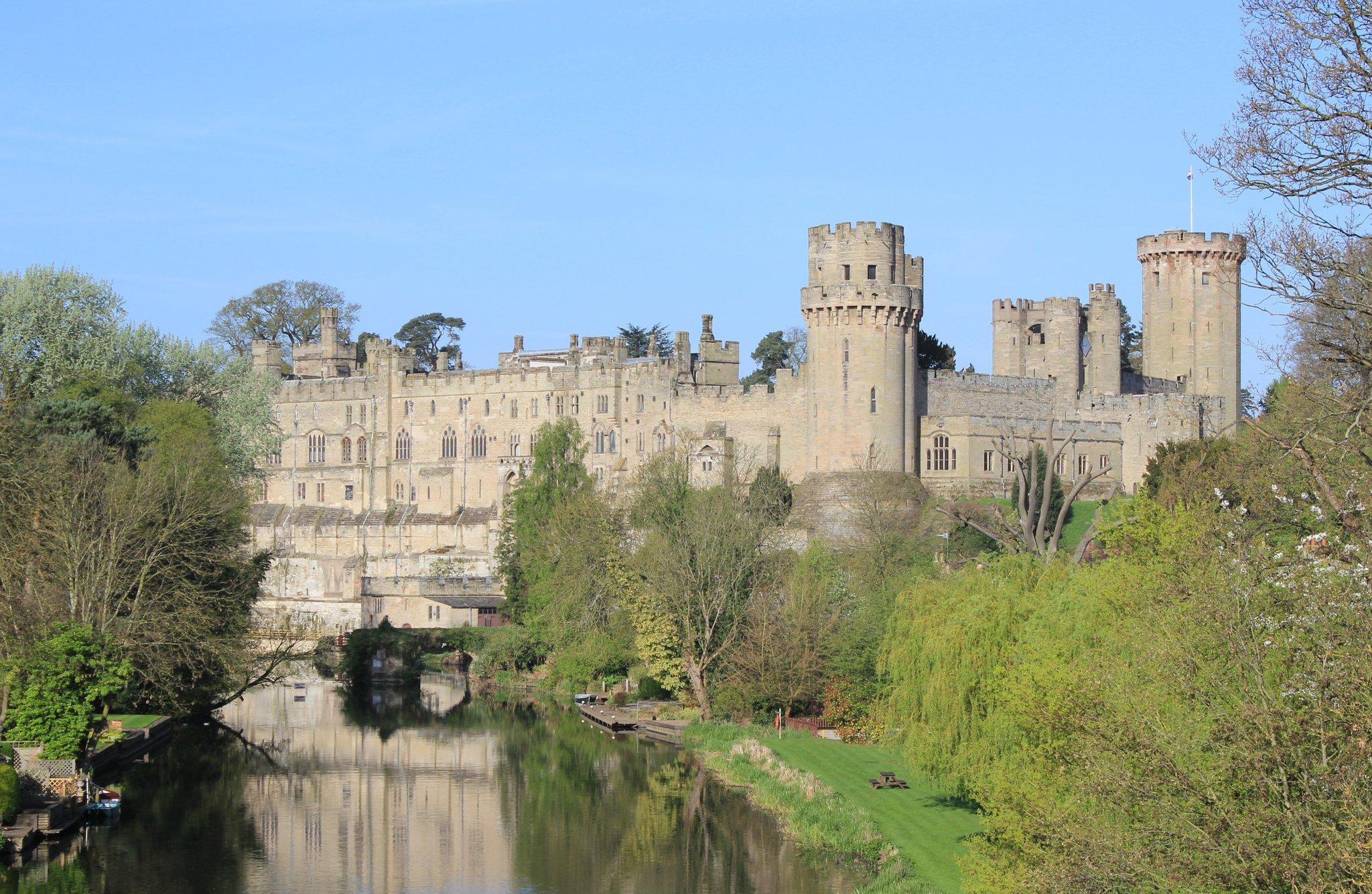
Warwick Castle, traditionally the seat of the Earls of Warwick, on the River Avon

Earl of Warwick is a title in the Peerage of the United Kingdom which has been created four times in English history. The name refers to Warwick Castle and the town of Warwick.

== Overview ==
The first creation came in 1088, and the title was held by the Beaumont and later by the Beauchamp families. The 14th earl was created Duke of Warwick in 1445, a title which became extinct on his early death the following year. The best-known earl of this creation was the 16th earl jure uxoris, Richard Neville, who was involved in the deposition of two kings, a fact which later earned him the epithet of "Warwick the Kingmaker". This creation became extinct on the death of the 17th earl in 1499.

The title was revived in 1547 for the powerful statesman John Dudley, 1st Viscount Lisle, who was later made Duke of Northumberland. The earldom was passed on during his lifetime to his eldest son, John, but both father and son were attainted in 1554. The title was recreated or restored in 1561 in favour of Ambrose Dudley, younger son of the Duke of Northumberland. However, Ambrose was childless and the earldom became extinct on his death in 1590.

It was created for a third time in 1618 for Robert Rich, 3rd Baron Rich, in spite of the fact that the Rich family was not in possession of Warwick Castle. From 1673, the earls also held the title of Earl of Holland. All of the titles became extinct on the death of the 8th earl in 1759.

The earldom was revived the same year in favour of Francis Greville, 1st Earl Brooke. The Greville family was in possession of Warwick Castle, and the title and castle were thereby re-united for the first time in over a century. The 1759 creation is extant and currently held by Guy Greville, 9th Earl of Warwick. However, Warwick Castle was sold by the family in 1978, and they currently live in Australia.

== 1088 creation ==
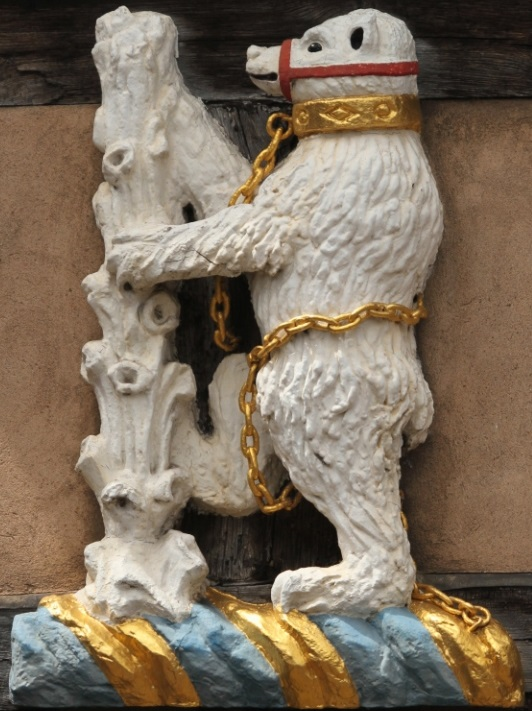
Bear and Ragged Staff ancient heraldic motif used by the Earls of Warwick

Arms of Newburgh/Beaumont Earls of Warwick, adopted c. 1200 – 1215 at start of the age of heraldry: Checky azure and or a chevron ermine

Arms of Beauchamp: Gules, a fesse between six cross crosslets or

Arms of Edward Plantagenet, 17th Earl of Warwick

The medieval earldom created in 1088 was held to be heritable via a female line of descent, and thus was held by members of several different families. It was traditionally associated in its feudal form with possession of Warwick Castle. The ancient heraldic device of the Earls of Warwick, the Bear and Ragged Staff, is believed to derive from two legendary Earls, Arthal and Morvidus. Arthal is thought to mean "bear", while Morvidus was to have slain a giant "with a young ash tree torn up by the roots." Alternatively the emblem of a bear (Latin ursus) is believed to refer to Urse d'Abetot (c. 1040 – 1108), 1st feudal baron of Salwarpe in Worcestershire, a Norman who followed King William the Conqueror to England, and served as Sheriff of Worcestershire. His heir was his son-in-law Walter de Beauchamp (died 1130/3), whose descendant was William de Beauchamp, 9th Earl of Warwick (c. 1238–1298).

The first Earl of Warwick was Henry de Beaumont (d.1119), second son of Roger de Beaumont (d. circa 1094) by his wife Adeline de Meulan (c. 1014/20–1081), daughter and heiress of Waleran III, Count of Meulan. Henry's elder brother was Robert de Beaumont, 1st Earl of Leicester, Count of Meulan, who fought at the Battle of Hastings with William the Conqueror. The family name of "Beaumont" was Latinised to de Bello Monte ("from the beautiful mountain"); the Warwick branch of the family was also known as de Newburgh, Latinised to de Novo Burgo ("from the new borough/town"). Henry changed his name to "de Newburgh", after the Castle de Neubourg, his home in Normandy, an ancient Beaumont possession. Henry became Constable of Warwick Castle in 1068 and Earl of Warwick in 1088 as reward for his support for the king during the Rebellion of 1088.

The title passed through several generations of the Beaumont family until 1242 when Thomas de Beaumont, 6th Earl of Warwick died without male issue. The earldom then went to his sister, Margaret de Beaumont, 7th Countess of Warwick and her successive husbands jure uxoris, and on her death to her cousin William Mauduit, 8th Earl of Warwick. When he died also without a male heir, the title passed to his sister, Isabel de Mauduit, and her husband Lord William de Beauchamp (d.1268), and thence to her son William de Beauchamp, 9th Earl of Warwick. During this period the Earldom and the Beauchamps were elevated to the highest levels until Henry de Beauchamp, 1st Duke of Warwick, 14th Earl of Warwick, was created Duke of Warwick with precedence over all except the Duke of Norfolk.

This precedence was disputed however and with Henry's death in 1445, also without male issue, the dukedom was extinguished. The earldom went to his infant daughter, and on her death aged 5 a few years later passed to Henry's sister Anne de Beauchamp, 16th Countess of Warwick and her husband Richard Neville, 16th Earl of Warwick, who "succeeded in right of his wife" but was subsequently "confirmed" in that title on 23 July 1449 which confirmation he thereafter resigned and was definitively created Earl of Warwick by letters patent dated 2 March 1450, with his wife being similarly created Countess of Warwick. He is known to history as "Warwick the Kingmaker" and died without male issue in 1471, aged 42, when the Earldom fell into abeyance between his two daughters.

After Richard Neville's death the title was passed through his eldest daughter Isabel Neville to her husband George Plantagenet, Duke of Clarence, brother of Kings Edward IV and Richard III, who on 25 March 1472 by letters patent was created Earl of Warwick (and Earl of Salisbury). Although he was so created, The Complete Peerage nevertheless terms him the 17th Earl of Warwick, which suggests perhaps that the creation was considered a mere formality and confirmation of his inheritance. He was attainted and executed in 1478 whereupon his titles became forfeited. His Earldom was forfeited and thus not able to be inherited by his son Edward Plantagenet, who did however manage to inherit it from his maternal grandmother Anne de Beauchamp (d.1492), wife of "Warwick the Kingmaker", who had been created Countess of Warwick by letters patent in 1450, at the same time her husband was created Earl of Warwick. He thus became Edward Plantagenet, 17th Earl of Warwick, but on his beheading for treason in 1499 the title became forfeited.

== 1547 creation ==
Arms of Dudley: Or, a lion rampant double-queued vert

The title was next conferred upon the powerful statesman and soldier John Dudley, 1st Viscount Lisle. He had already been created Viscount Lisle in right of his deceased mother, Elizabeth Grey, in 1543, and was made Earl of Warwick in the Peerage of England in 1547. In 1551 he was further honoured when he was created Duke of Northumberland. In January 1553 Parliament passed the earldom to his eldest son John, the second Earl. He died young in 1554, and having been attainted along with his father in August 1553, the title became extinct until it was revived in 1561 for his younger brother Ambrose, the third Earl. He served as Master-General of the Ordnance and Lord Lieutenant of Warwickshire. On his death in 1590 the earldom became extinct.

== 1618 creation ==
Arms of Rich: Gules, a chevron between three crosses botonée or

The title was re-created when Robert Rich, 3rd Baron Rich, was made Earl of Warwick in 1618. This was despite the fact that the Rich family were not in possession of Warwick Castle (this was in the hands of the Greville family; see the 1759 creation below). His second son Henry Rich was created Baron Kensington in 1623 and Earl of Holland in 1624. Lord Warwick was succeeded by his eldest son, the second Earl. He represented Maldon in the House of Commons and served as Lord Lieutenant of Essex.

His eldest son, the third Earl, sat as Member of Parliament for Essex. He died without surviving male issue and was succeeded by his younger brother, the fourth Earl. He represented Sandwich and Essex in Parliament. On his death the line of the second Earl of Warwick failed and the titles were inherited by his first cousin Robert Rich, 2nd Earl Holland, who became the fifth Earl of Warwick as well. He was the son of the aforementioned Henry Rich, 1st Earl of Holland, younger son of the first Earl of Warwick (see the Earl of Holland for earlier history of this branch of the family). This line of the family failed on the early death of his grandson, the seventh Earl, in 1721. The late Earl was succeeded by his second cousin Edward Rich, the eighth Earl. He was the grandson of Cope Rich, younger son of the first Earl of Holland. On his death in 1759 all the titles became extinct.

Lady Mary Rich, daughter of the first Earl of Holland, married Sir John Campbell, 5th Baronet, who was created Earl of Breadalbane and Holland in 1681. Also, Lady Elizabeth Rich, only daughter and heiress of the fifth Earl of Warwick and second Earl of Holland, married Francis Edwardes. Their son William Edwardes succeeded to parts of the Rich estates and was created Baron Kensington in the Peerage of Ireland in 1776, a revival of the barony attached to the earldom of Holland.

Charles Rich, son of Sir Edward Rich, younger son of the second Baron Rich, was created a baronet in 1676 (see Rich baronets).

== 1759 creation ==
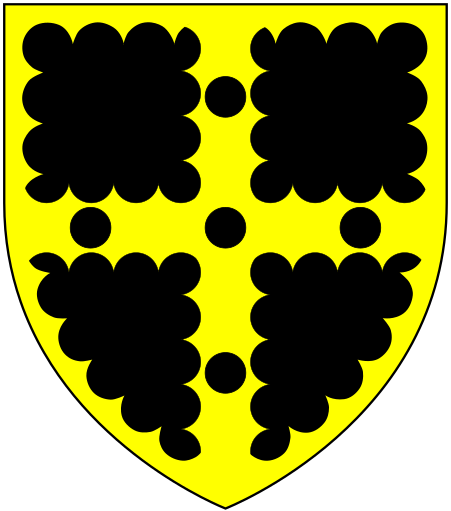
Arms of Greville: Sable, on a cross engrailed or five pellets all within a bordure engrailed of the second

The title was again created in 1759 when Francis, 1st Earl Brooke, was made Earl of Warwick in the Peerage of Great Britain. In 1746 he had been created Earl Brooke, of Warwick Castle in the County of Warwick, in the Peerage of Great Britain. The earldom and Warwick Castle were thereby re-united for the first time in over a century. In 1767 the Earl petitioned the House of Lords for permission to use just the more prestigious title and style of "Earl of Warwick" only, with the precedence of 1746. Such permission was never granted but the Earls nevertheless ceased to use the Brooke earldom in style, and have always been known (except in the House of Lords) simply as the Earl of Warwick.

The first Earl was succeeded by his eldest son, the second Earl. He represented Warwick in Parliament and served as a Lord of Trade and as Lord Lieutenant of Warwickshire. His eldest son from his second marriage, the third Earl, sat as Member of Parliament for Warwick and held minor office in the second administration of Sir Robert Peel. He was also Lord Lieutenant of Warwickshire. He was succeeded by his son, the fourth Earl. He represented Warwickshire South in the House of Commons. His eldest son, the fifth Earl, was Conservative Member of Parliament for Somerset East and served as Lord Lieutenant of Essex. As of 2018, the titles are held by the latter's great-great-grandson, the ninth Earl, who succeeded his father in 1996.

== List of titleholders ==
=== Earl of Warwick, first creation (1088) ===
- Henry de Beaumont, 1st Earl of Warwick (died 1119)
- Roger de Beaumont, 2nd Earl of Warwick (c. 1102 – 1153), son, who married Gundred de Warenne, daughter of William de Warenne, 2nd Earl of Surrey, and Elizabeth de Vermandois.
- William de Beaumont, 3rd Earl of Warwick (before 1140 – 1184), son,
- Waleran de Beaumont, 4th Earl of Warwick (1153–1204), younger brother
- Henry de Beaumont, 5th Earl of Warwick (c. 1192–1229), son
- Thomas de Beaumont, 6th Earl of Warwick (1208–1242), son
- Margaret de Beaumont, 7th Countess of Warwick (died 1253), sister
  - John Marshal, jure uxoris 7th Earl of Warwick (died 1242)
  - John du Plessis, jure uxoris 7th Earl of Warwick (died 1263)
- William Mauduit, 8th Earl of Warwick (c. 1221 – 1268), grandson of Waleran, half-cousin of Margaret
- William de Beauchamp, 9th Earl of Warwick (c. 1238 – 1298), great-grandson of Waleran, nephew of William (8th)
- Guy de Beauchamp, 10th Earl of Warwick (c. 1272 – 1315), son of William (9th)
- Thomas Beauchamp, 11th Earl of Warwick (c. 1313 – 1369), son of Guy
- Thomas Beauchamp, 12th Earl of Warwick (1338–1401), son of Thomas (11th)
- Richard Beauchamp, 13th Earl of Warwick (1382–1439), son of Thomas (12th), the Earl of Warwick in William Shakespeare's First Part of Henry the Sixth
- Henry de Beauchamp, 14th Earl of Warwick (1425–1446), son of Richard (created Duke of Warwick in 1445)
- Anne Beauchamp, 15th Countess of Warwick (1444–1449), daughter of Henry (14th)
- Anne Beauchamp, 16th Countess of Warwick (1426–1492), daughter of Richard (13th)
  - Richard Neville, jure uxoris 16th Earl of Warwick (1428–1471) (Warwick the Kingmaker)
- Edward Plantagenet, 17th Earl of Warwick (1475–1499), grandson of Anne (16th)

=== Duke of Warwick (1445–1446) ===
- Henry de Beauchamp, 1st Duke of Warwick (1425–1446)

=== Earl of Warwick, second creation (1547) ===
- John Dudley, 1st Duke of Northumberland, 1st Earl of Warwick (1504–1553)
- John Dudley, 2nd Earl of Warwick (c. 1527 – 1554)
- Ambrose Dudley, 3rd Earl of Warwick (c. 1530 – 1590)

=== Earl of Warwick, third creation (1618) ===
Other title: Baron Rich (1547)

- Robert Rich, 1st Earl of Warwick (1559–1619)
- Robert Rich, 2nd Earl of Warwick (1587–1658)
- Robert Rich, 3rd Earl of Warwick (1611–1659)
- Charles Rich, 4th Earl of Warwick (1623–1673)
- Robert Rich, 5th Earl of Warwick, 2nd Earl of Holland (1620–1675)
  - Henry Rich, Lord Kensington (1642–1659)
- Edward Rich, 6th Earl of Warwick, 3rd Earl of Holland (1673–1701)
- Edward Henry Rich, 7th Earl of Warwick, 4th Earl of Holland (1698–1721)
- Edward Rich, 8th Earl of Warwick, 5th Earl of Holland (1695–1759)

=== Earl of Warwick, fourth creation (1759), also Earl Brooke (1746) ===
Other title: Baron Brooke (1621)

- Francis Greville, 1st Earl of Warwick, 1st Earl Brooke (1719–1773)
- George Greville, 2nd Earl of Warwick, 2nd Earl Brooke (1746–1816)
  - George Greville, Lord Brooke (1772–1786)
- Henry Richard Greville, 3rd Earl of Warwick, 3rd Earl Brooke (1779–1853)
- George Guy Greville, 4th Earl of Warwick, 4th Earl Brooke (1818–1893)
- Francis Richard Charles Greville, 5th Earl of Warwick, 5th Earl Brooke (1853–1924)
- Leopold Guy Francis Maynard Greville, 6th Earl of Warwick, 6th Earl Brooke (1882–1928)
- Charles Guy Fulke Greville, 7th Earl of Warwick, 7th Earl Brooke (1911–1984)
- David Robin Francis Guy Greville, 8th Earl of Warwick, 8th Earl Brooke (1934–1996)
- Guy David Greville, 9th Earl of Warwick, 9th Earl Brooke (born 1957)

Warwick family tree including the peerages of Brooke, Holland, Kensington, and Warwick

Earl of Warwick (1st creation), 1088
Henry de Beaumont d. 1119; 1st Earl of Warwick	William de Warenne d. 1138; Earl of Surrey	Elizabeth de Vermandois c. 1085–1131; Countess of Leicester
Roger de Beaumont c. 1102–1153; 2nd Earl of Warwick	Gundred de Warenne
William de Beaumont (bef. 1140–1184); 3rd Earl of Warwick	Waleran de Beaumont d. 1204; 4th Earl of Warwick
Henry de Beaumont (c. 1192-1229); 5th Earl of Warwick	Alice de Newburgh
Thomas de Beaumont; 1208–1242; 6th Earl of Warwick	m1. John Marshal d. 1242; 7th Earl of Warwick jure uxoris	Margaret de Beaumont d. 1242; 7th Countess of Warwick suo jure	m2. John du Plessis d. 1263; 7th Earl of Warwick jure uxoris	Isabel de Mauduit	William Mauduit c. 1221–1268; 8th Earl of Warwick
William de Beauchamp c. 1238–1298; 9th Earl of Warwick
Guy de Beauchamp c. 1272–1315; 10th Earl of Warwick
Thomas Beauchamp c. 1313–1369; 11th Earl of Warwick
Thomas Beauchamp; 1338–1401; 12th Earl of Warwick
Richard Beauchamp; 1382–1439; 13th Earl of Warwick
Duke of Warwick, 1445
Margaret Beauchamp; 1404–1467	Henry Beauchamp; 1425–1446; Duke of Warwick, 14th Earl of Warwick	Richard of York; 1411–1460; Duke of York	Anne Beauchamp; 1426–1492; 16th Countess of Warwick	Richard Neville "the Kingmaker"; 1428–1471; 16th Earl of Warwick jure uxoris	Henry VI; 1421–1471; King of England
Dukedom of Warwick extinct, 1446
John Talbot; 1426–1453; Viscount Lisle	Anne Beauchamp; 1444–1449; 15th Countess of Warwick	George Plantagenet; 1449–1478; Duke of Clarence	Isabel Neville; 1451–1476	m2. Richard III; 1452–1485; King of England	Anne Neville; 1456–1485	m1. Edward of Westminster; 1453–1471; Prince of Wales
Elizabeth Talbot d. 1487	Edward Grey d. 1492; Viscount Lisle	Edward Plantagenet; 1475–1499; 17th Earl of Warwick
Earldom of Warwick (1st creation) forfeit, 1499
Elizabeth Grey c. 1482/1484–c. 1525/1526
Viscount Lisle (5th creation), 1542; Earl of Warwick (2nd creation), 1547	Baron Rich of Leez, 1547; See also Rich family tree
John Dudley c. 1502–1553; Duke of Northumberland, 1st Earl of Warwick, etc.	Richard Rich; 1496–1567; 1st Baron Rich
Fulke Greville d. 1559	John Dudley c. 1527–1554; 2nd Earl of Warwick, etc.	Ambrose Dudley c. 1530–1590; 3rd Earl of Warwick, etc.	Robert Dudley; 1532–1588; Earl of Leicester	Robert Rich c. 1538–1581; 2nd Baron Rich
Earldom of Warwick (2nd creation) and subsidiary title extinct, 1590
Earl of Warwick (3rd creation), 1618
Fulke Greville; 1536–1606	Robert Greville (?)	Robert Rich; 1559–1619; 1st Earl of Warwick, 3rd Baron Rich
Baron Brooke of Beauchamps Court, 1621	Baron Kensington of Kensington in the County of Middlesex (1st creation), 1623; Earl of Holland, 1624
Fulke Greville; 1554–1628 de jure 13th Baron Latimer, 5th Baron Willoughby de Broke, 1st Baron Brooke	Fulke Greville; 1575–1632	Robert Rich; 1587–1658; 2nd Earl of Warwick, 4th Baron Rich	Henry Rich; 1590–1649; 1st Earl of Holland, etc.
Robert Greville; 1607–1643; 2nd Baron Brooke	Anne Rich; 1604–1642; Countess of Manchester	Robert Rich; 1611–1659; 3rd Earl of Warwick, 5th Baron Rich	Charles Rich; 1623–1673; 4th Earl of Warwick, 6th Baron Rich
Francis Greville (bef. 1637–1658); 3rd Baron Brooke	Robert Greville; 1639–1677; 4th Baron Brooke	Fulke Greville; 1643–1710; 5th Baron Brooke	Anne Montagu (d. c. 1689)	Robert Rich; 1620–1675; 5th Earl of Warwick, 2nd Earl of Holland, etc., 7th Baron Rich	Cope Rich; 1634–1676
Francis Greville d. 1710	Elizabeth Rich d. 1725	Edward Rich; 1673–1701; 6th Earl of Warwick, 3rd Earl of Holland, etc., 8th Baron Rich	Cope Rich d. 1706
Fulke Greville c. 1693–1711; 6th Baron Brooke	William Greville; 1695–1727; 7th Baron Brooke	Francis Edwardes d. 1725	Edward Henry Rich; 1698–1721; 7th Earl of Warwick, 4th Earl of Holland, etc., 9th Baron Rich	Edward Rich; 1695–1759; 8th Earl of Warwick, 5th Earl of Holland, etc., 10th Baron Rich
Earldoms of Warwick (3rd creation) and Holland extinct, 1759
Earl Brooke, 1746; Earl of Warwick (4th creation), 1759	Baron Kensington (Ireland)
Francis Greville; 1719–1773; 1st Earl of Warwick, 1st Earl Brooke, 8th Baron Brooke	William Edwardes c. 1711–1801; 1st Baron Kensington
George Greville; 1746–1816; 2nd Earl of Warwick, 2nd Earl Brooke, 9th Baron Brooke
George Greville; 1772–1786 styled Lord Brooke	Henry Richard Greville; 1779–1853; 3rd Earl of Warwick, 3rd Earl Brooke, 10th Baron Brooke	William Edwardes; 1777–1852; 2nd Baron Kensington
George Guy Greville; 1818–1893; 4th Earl of Warwick, 4th Earl Brooke, 11th Baron Brooke	William Edwardes; 1801–1872; 3rd Baron Kensington
Baron Kensington, of Kensington in the County of Middlesex (United Kingdom)
Francis Richard Charles Greville; 1853–1924; 5th Earl of Warwick, 5th Earl Brooke, 12th Baron Brooke	William Edwardes; 1835–1896; 4th/1st (Ire/UK) Baron Kensington
Leopold Guy Francis Maynard Greville; 1882–1928; 6th Earl of Warwick, 6th Earl Brooke, 13th Baron Brooke	William Edwardes; 1868–1900; 5th/2nd (Ire/UK) Baron Kensington	Hugh Edwardes; 1873–1938; 6th/3rd (Ire/UK) Baron Kensington
Charles Guy Fulke Greville; 1911–1984; 7th Earl of Warwick, 7th Earl Brooke, 14th Baron Brooke	William Edwardes; 1904–1981; 7th/4th (Ire/UK) Baron Kensington	Hugh Owen Edwardes; 1905–1937
David Robin Francis Guy Greville; 1934–1996; 8th Earl of Warwick, 8th Earl Brooke, 15th Baron Brooke	Hugh Ivor Edwardes; 1933–2018; 8th/5th (Ire/UK) Baron Kensington
Guy David Greville b. 1957; 9th Earl of Warwick, 9th Earl Brooke, 16th Baron Brooke	William Owen Alexander Edwardes b. 1964; 9th/6th (Ire/UK) Baron Kensington
Charles Fulke Chester Greville b. 1982 styled Lord Brooke	William Francis Ivor Edwardes b. 1993
Heir apparent to the earldom of Warwick and the earldom of Brooke	Heir apparent to the baronies of Kensington

== Other uses ==
- Earl of Warwick was one of the GWR 3031 Class locomotives that were built for and run on the Great Western Railway between 1891 and 1915.
- The Guy Earl of Warwick is a public house in Welling, Dartford.
- "Riccardo, Earl of Warwick and governor of Boston" is a fictional character and lead role for tenor in the traditional setting of Giuseppe Verdi's opera, Un ballo in maschera.

== See also ==
- Duke of Northumberland (1551 creation)
- Daisy Greville, Countess of Warwick
- Baron Willoughby de Broke
- Baron Greville
- Earl of Holland
- Earl of Breadalbane and Holland
- Baron Kensington
- Rich baronets
