= Rich family =

English noble family

Arms of Rich: Gules, a chevron between three crosses botonée or

The Rich family was a noble family of England that held the peerage titles of Baron Rich, Earl of Warwick, Baron Kensington, Earl of Holland and Baronet Rich during a period spanning the 16th–18th centuries.

== Family tree ==
Rich family tree

(Unknown)	Richard Rich; 1st BR (1496/7–1567)	Elizabeth Jenks (1510–1558)
Ann or Jane Machell (b. 1557)	Richard Rich (illegitimate)	Robert Rich; 2nd BR (c. 1537–1581)	Elizabeth Baldry
Robert Rich (c. 1585-1630)	Sir Nathaniel Rich (1585–1636)	Honora Worlick	Sir Edwin Rich (1561–1600)	Robert Rich; 3rd BR; 1st EW (1559–1618)	Penelope Devereux (1563–1607)
Elizabeth Hampden (died 1655) (cousin of John Hampden)	Colonel Nathaniel Rich (d. c. 1701)	Elizabeth Cholmeley (d. 1694)	Sir Charles Rich; 1st Bt (c. 1619–1677)	Sir Edwin Rich (1594–1675)
Sir Robert Rich; 2nd Bt (c. 1648–1699)	Mary Rich (d. 1714)	Isabel Cope (d. 1655)	Henry Rich; 1st BK; 1st EH (1590–1649)	Robert Rich; 4th BR; 2nd EW (1587–1658)	Frances Hatton (1590–1623)	Isabella Rich (b. c. 1590)
Elizabeth Griffith (b. c. 1692–1773)	Sir Robert Rich; 4th Bt (1685–1768)	Sir Charles Rich; 3rd Bt (c. 1680–1706)	Mary Boyle; CW (1625–1678)	Charles Rich; 6th BR; 4th EW (1619–1673)	Robert Rich; 5th BR; 3rd EW (1611–1659)	Lady Anne Rich (1604–1641/42)	Edward Montagu; 2nd EM (1602–1671)
Sir Robert Rich; 5th Bt (1717–1785)	Sir George Rich; 6th Bt (1728–1799)	Sir James Thynne (1605–1670)	Lady Isabella Rich (b. 1623)	Cope Rich (Note: Spouse not known) (1634–1676)	Robert Rich; 7th BR; 5th EW; 2nd EH; 2nd BK (1620–1675)	Lady Anne Montagu (d. c. 1689)	Robert Montagu; 3rd Earl of Manchester (1634–1683)
John Campbell; 1st EBH (1636–1717)	Lady Mary Rich (1632–1666)	Cope Rich (d. 1706)	Charlotte Myddleton (1680–1731, daughter of Sir Thomas Myddelton)	Edward Rich; 8th BR; 6th EW; 3rd EH; 3rd BK (1673–1701)	Lady Elizabeth Rich (d. 1725)	Francis Edwardes (d. 1725)
Earls of Breadalbane and Holland (Campbell family)	Edward Rich; 10th BR; 8th EW; 5th EH; 5th BK (1695–1759) (Note: Edward Rich had no sons; consequently, all of the titles Baron Rich (Earl of Warwick, Baron Kensington and Earl of Holland) expired on his death.)	Edward Henry Rich; 9th BR; 7th EW; 4th EH; 4th BK (d. 1721)	Barons Kensington (Edwardes family)

Key

- BR: Baron Rich
- Bt: Baronet (Rich baronets, of London)
- EW: Earl of Warwick
- CW: Countess of Warwick
- BK: Baron Kensington
- EH: Earl of Holland
- EM: Earl of Manchester
- EBH: Earl of Breadalbane and Holland

Boxes with heavy borders follow the progress of Rich titles.
Blue boxes indicate members of the family granted a new title.
