= Lord Holland =

Lord Holland may refer to any of the holders of the following titles:

- Earl of Holland, 1624 to 1759
- Baron Holland, either Baron Holland of Holland in the County of Lincoln, 1762 to 1859; or Baron Holland of Foxley in the County of Wiltshire, 1763 to 1859
