= Francis Greville =

Francis Greville may refer to:

- Francis Greville, 3rd Baron Brooke (died 1658),
- Francis Greville (MP for Warwick) (1667–1710), politician and poet
- Francis Greville, 1st Earl of Warwick (1719–1773), British nobleman
- Francis Greville, 5th Earl of Warwick (1853–1924), British politician, MP for Somerset East, and for Colchester

== See also ==
- Frances Greville (1724–1789), female Irish poet
