= Richard Rich, 1st Baron Rich =

English politician (1496–1567)

The Right Honourable Richard Rich Kt
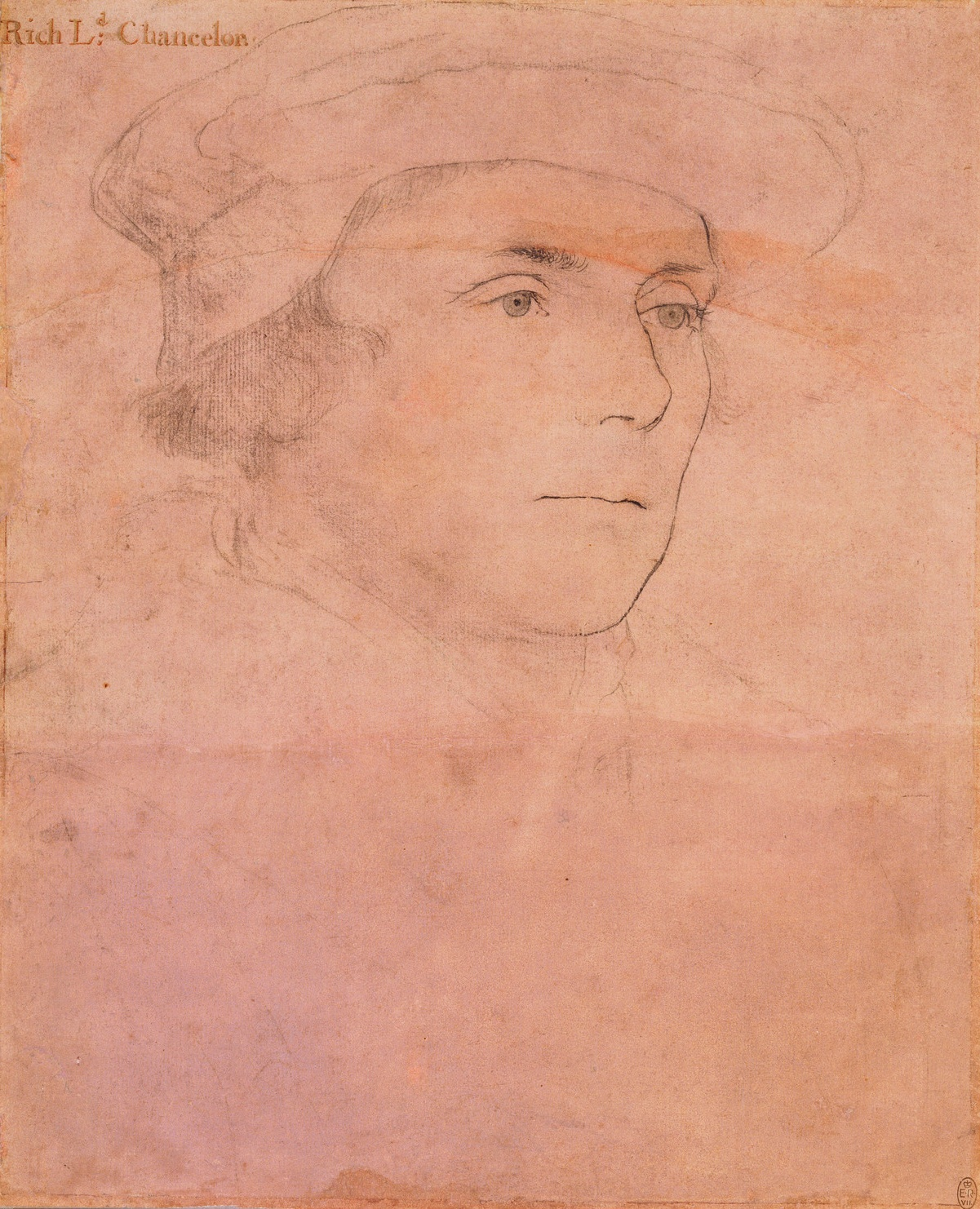
- Sketch by Hans Holbein the Younger

Speaker of the House of Commons
- In office 9 June 1536 – 18 July 1536
- Preceded by: Humphrey Wingfield
- Succeeded by: Nicholas Hare

Lord Chancellor
- In office 1547–1552
- Preceded by: The Lord St John
- Succeeded by: Thomas Goodrich

Personal details
- Born: c. 1496 London, Kingdom of England
- Died: 12 June 1567 (aged about 71) Rochford, Essex, Kingdom of England
- Resting place: Felsted, Essex
- Occupation: Politician; Lawyer
- Known for: Role in the Dissolution of the Monasteries; Prosecution of Thomas More

Arms of Rich: Gules, a chevron between three crosses botonée or

Richard Rich, 1st Baron Rich (1496 – 12 June 1567), was an English lawyer, statesman, and nobleman who served as Lord Chancellor of England during the reign of King Edward VI from 1547 to 1551. He amassed considerable wealth and influence through his involvement in the Dissolution of the Monasteries, acquiring extensive lands and properties formerly owned by the Roman Catholic Church in England. He also played a prominent role in the prosecution of individuals perceived as threats to the crown’s authority, including the Catholic figures Thomas More and John Fisher, as well as the Protestant martyr Anne Askew. In 1564, he founded Felsted School in Essex along with its associated almshouses, leaving a lasting legacy in education and charitable institutions.

== Origins ==
According to some sources, Rich was born in the London parish of St Lawrence Jewry, the second son of Richard Rich by Joan Dingley, but this is disputed. Also, according to Carter, he was born at Basingstoke, Hampshire, the son of John Rich (d. 1509?), of Penton Mewsey, Hampshire, and a wife named Agnes whose surname is unknown. In 1509, Richard inherited his father's house in Islington, Middlesex. Early in 1551 he was described in an official document as "fifty-four years of age and more", and was therefore born about 1496 or earlier.

According to Sergeaunt (1889):

The origin of the family of Lord Rich has been matter of some discussion ... The first of the family of whom there is definite information was Richard Rich, a wealthy mercer of London and Sheriff of the City in 1441. The date of his death is given by Burke as 1469, but it would seem that he has been confounded with his son John, who was buried in the Mercer’s chapel in that year. The family remained in the city, and the son of John Rich was probably also a mercer. To him was born sometime between 1480 and 1490 a son whom he named Richard.

He had a brother, Robert, whom Henry VIII granted a messuage in Bucklersbury on 24 February 1539, and who died in 1557.

== Career ==
Little is known of Rich's early life. He may have studied at Cambridge before 1516. That year, he entered the Middle Temple as a lawyer and at some point between 1520 and 1525 he was a reader at the New Inn. By 1528 Rich was in search of a patron and wrote to Cardinal Wolsey; in 1529, Thomas Audley succeeded in helping him get elected as an MP for Colchester. As Audley's career advanced in the early 1530s, so did Rich's, through a variety of legal posts, before he became truly prominent in the mid-1530s.

Other preferments followed, and in 1533 Rich was knighted and became the Solicitor General for England and Wales in which capacity he was to act under Thomas Cromwell as a "lesser hammer" for the demolition of the monasteries, and to secure the operation of Henry VIII's Act of Supremacy. Rich had a share in the trials of Thomas More and Bishop John Fisher. In both cases his evidence against the prisoner included admissions made in friendly conversation, and in More's case the words were given a misconstruction that could hardly be other than wilful. While on trial, More said that Rich was "always reputed light of his tongue, a great dicer and gamester, and not of any commendable fame." Rich also played a major part in Cromwell's fall.

As King's Solicitor, Rich travelled to Kimbolton Castle in Huntingdonshire in January 1536 to take the inventory of the goods of Katherine of Aragon, and wrote to Henry advising how he might properly obtain her possessions.

=== Chancellor ===
On 19 April 1536 Rich became the chancellor of the Court of Augmentations, established for the disposal of the monastic revenues. His own share of the spoil, acquired either by grant or purchase, included Leez (Leighs) Priory and about 100 manors in Essex. Rich also acquired—and destroyed—the real estate and holdings of the Priory of St Bartholomew-the-Great in Smithfield. He was Speaker of the House of Commons in the same year, and advocated the king's policy. Despite the share he had taken in the suppression of the monasteries, the prosecution of Thomas More and Bishop Fisher and the part he played under Edward VI and Elizabeth I, his religious beliefs remained nominally Catholic.

Rich was also a participant in the torture of Anne Askew, the only woman tortured at the Tower of London. Both he and Chancellor Wriothesley turned the wheels of the rack to torture her.

=== Baron Rich ===
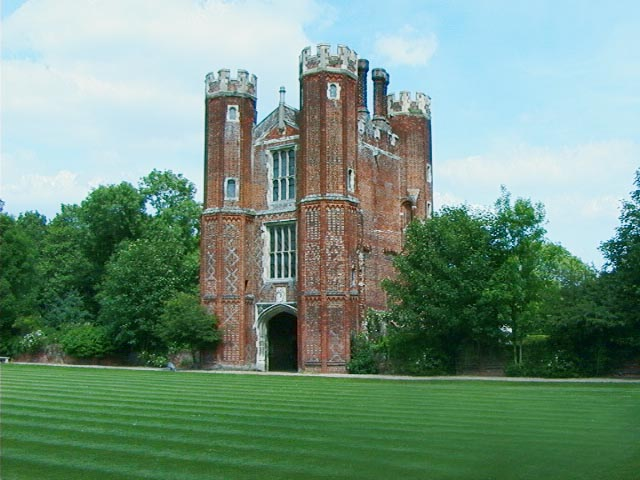
Leez Priory tower in Essex

Rich was an assistant executor of the will of King Henry VIII, and received a grant of lands. He became Baron Rich of Leez on 26 February 1547. In the next month he succeeded Wriothesley as chancellor. He supported Lord Protector Edward Seymour in his policies, including reforms in Church matters and the prosecution of his brother Thomas Seymour, until the crisis of October 1549, when he joined with John Dudley. He resigned his office in January 1552.

=== Prosecution of bishops ===
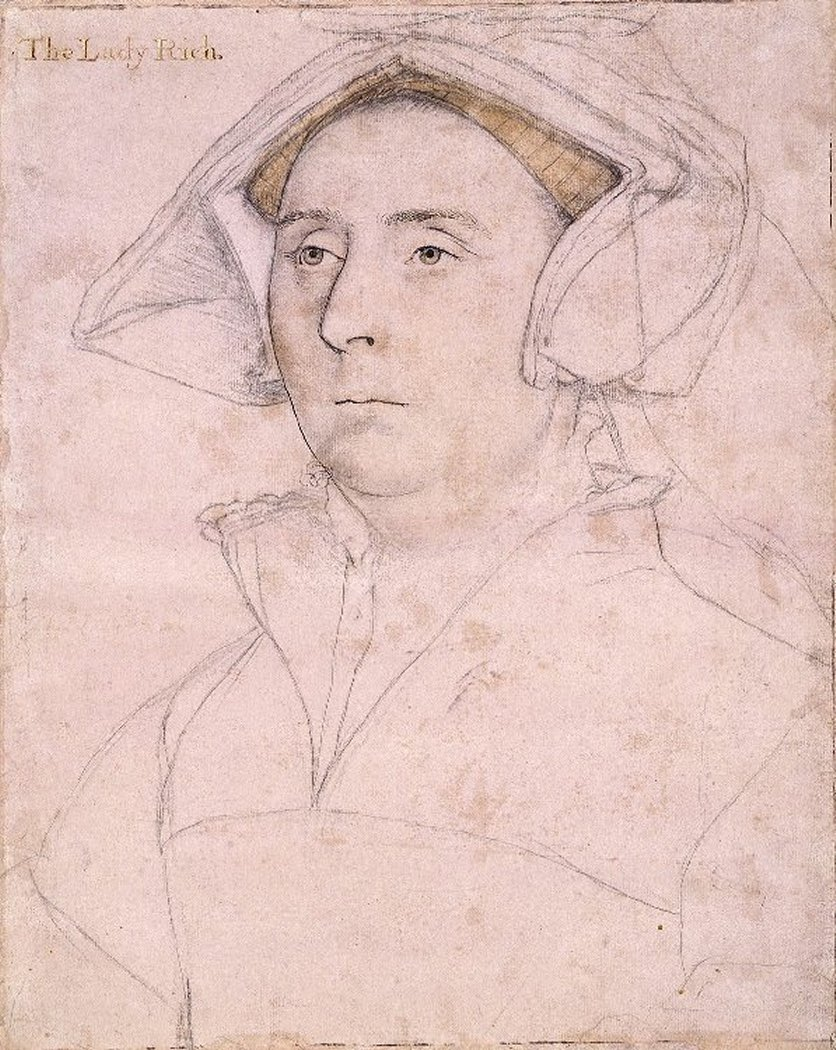
Elizabeth, Lady Rich, by Hans Holbein the Younger.

Rich took part in the prosecution of bishops Stephen Gardiner and Edmund Bonner, and had a role in the harsh treatment accorded to the future Mary I. But upon her accession, Mary showed Rich no ill will. He took an active part in the restoration of the old religion in Essex under the new reign, and was one of the most active persecutors. His reappearances in the privy council were rare during Mary's reign, but under Elizabeth I he served on a commission to inquire into the grants of land made under Mary, and in 1566 was sent for to advise on the question of the queen's marriage. He died at Rochford in Essex, on 12 June 1567, and was buried in Holy Cross Church in Felsted.

In Mary's reign he founded a chaplaincy with provision for the singing of masses and dirges, and the ringing of bells in Felsted church. To this was added a Lenten allowance of herrings to the inhabitants of three parishes. These donations were transferred in 1564 to the foundation of Felsted School for instruction, primarily for children born on the founder's manors, in Latin, Greek, and divinity. The patronage of the school remained in the founder's family until 1851.

=== Descendants ===
Richard Rich died in June 1567. Rich's descendants formed the powerful Rich family, lasting for three centuries, acquiring several titles in the Peerage of England and intermarrying with numerous other noble families.

By his wife Elizabeth Jenks (Gynkes) (d.1558) he had 15 children. Thirteen of them are shown in the Essex pedigrees. The eldest son, Robert (1537?–1581), second Baron Rich, supported the Reformation.

One grandson, Richard Rich, was the first husband of Katherine Knyvet: another, the younger Robert Rich, third Baron Rich (1559–1619) was created First Earl of Warwick (of the third creation) in 1618, and was the father of Robert Rich, 2nd Earl of Warwick, who was Commander of the Commonwealth Navy during the Interregnum. This line failed with the death of the 8th Earl on 7 September 1759.

Rich had an illegitimate son named Richard (d. 1598) whom he acknowledged fully in his will with legacies and guardians for his minority, his education in the common law, and suitable marital arrangements. In this line of descent was his grandson the merchant adventurer Sir Nathaniel Rich, and his great-grandson Nathaniel Rich (nephew of the elder Nathaniel), a colonel in the New Model Army during the English Civil War. One of his distant descendants is Rory Stewart.

== Legacy ==
Since the mid-16th century Rich has had a reputation for immorality, financial dishonesty, double-dealing, perjury and treachery rarely matched in English history. The historian Hugh Trevor-Roper called Rich a man "of whom nobody has ever spoken a good word".

== Depiction in the arts ==
Rich is the supporting villain in the play A Man for All Seasons by Robert Bolt, which shows his slide into corruption. In the subsequent, Oscar-winning film adaptation, John Hurt portrays him. Bolt depicts Rich as perjuring himself against More in order to become Attorney-General for Wales. More responds, "Why, Richard, it profits a man nothing to give his soul for the whole world ... but for Wales?" The final line of the film notes that Rich "died in his bed" in juxtaposition with More's martyrdom and the other major characters' untimely deaths. In the 1988 remake of the film, Jonathan Hackett portrayed Rich.

Rich is a supporting character in C. J. Sansom's Shardlake series of historical mystery novels, which are set in Henry VIII's reign. Rich is portrayed as a cruel villain who is prepared to subvert justice to enhance his property and position. He has a significant role in the plot of Sovereign, the third of the series, and in Heartstone, the fifth.

Rod Hallett played Rich in seasons two, three and four of the Showtime series The Tudors.

Rich (spelled Riche in the novels) appears in Hilary Mantel's three volumes about Thomas Cromwell, Wolf Hall, Bring Up the Bodies and The Mirror & the Light. Bryan Dick portrays him in the first series of the BBC's television adaptation of Wolf Hall, which covers the first two novels in the trilogy, and Tom Mothersdale in the second series, which covers the third volume.

== Notes ==
Political offices
Preceded by Sir Humphrey Wingfield	Speaker of the House of Commons; 1536	Succeeded by Sir Nicholas Hare
Preceded by William Paulet, Lord St John (Keeper of the Great Seal)	Lord Chancellor; 1547–1552	Succeeded by Thomas Goodrich (Keeper of the Great Seal)
Peerage of England
New creation	Baron Rich; 1548–1567	Succeeded by Robert Rich
