= Richard Rich (Sheriff of London) =

Sheriff of London (died c. 1464)

- Died: 1463–64
- Title: Sheriff of London
- Spouse: Catherine
- Children: 5

Richard Rich (died 1463–4) was a London mercer (dealer in textiles), and Sheriff of that city in 1441.

== Early life ==
Rich was the son of Richard Rich of London, esquire, who died in 1447–48 seised of lands in Springfield, Little Waltham, Great Leighs, Terling and Boreham in Essex.

== Marriage and issue ==
Rich married a wife named Catherine, whose surname is unknown. Some say she was called Catherine Cutlery, and to have lived 1407–1448, but some also say that was the name of Rich's mother.

By Catherine he had two sons and three daughters:

- John Rich (d. 29 July 1458), buried in the Mercers' Chapel in London, who married a wife named Isabel, and predeceased his father, leaving a son, Thomas Rich, who married Margaret Shaa, the daughter of Sir Edmund Shaa, Lord Mayor of London, by whom he had a son, Thomas Rich (d. 3 March 1531), esquire, of South Weald, Essex.
- Thomas Rich, who married Elizabeth Croke (d. 1479), the daughter of John Croke, alderman of London. In his will, dated 2 July 1471 and proved 17 October 1475, he left £20 towards the marriage of his nephew, Thomas Rich, 'son of John Rich, sometimes my brother'. After the death of Thomas Rich, Elizabeth Croke married secondly John Fenne (d. 3 September 1474), and thirdly, in 1475, Sir William Stonor (d. 21 May 1494).
- Katherine Rich, who married William Marrow or Marowe (1410–1464), Lord Mayor of London in 1455, by whom she had three sons, William, John and Thomas, and three daughters.
- Isabel Rich, who married Sir Thomas Urswick (d. 19 March 1479). They had four sons, all of whom predeceased Sir Thomas, and eight daughters, only five of whom, Katherine, who married Henry Langley, Anne, who married John Doreward, Elizabeth, Jane and Mary, survived to be their father's heirs.
- Margaret Rich, who married John Walden (1410–1464), alderman and grocer of London. She is mentioned in the will of her brother, Thomas Rich.

== Death ==
Rich died 1463-4 and was buried in the church of St Lawrence Jewry, London.

His will, dated 20 April 1463 and proved 16 August 1464, shows that he died possessed of large estates in Middlesex and Hertfordshire, and was wealthy enough to found five almshouses in Broxbourne, Hertfordshire.
