= Henry Rich, 1st Earl of Holland =

English courtier and politician executed by Parliament

The Right Honourable The Earl of Holland KB PC JP
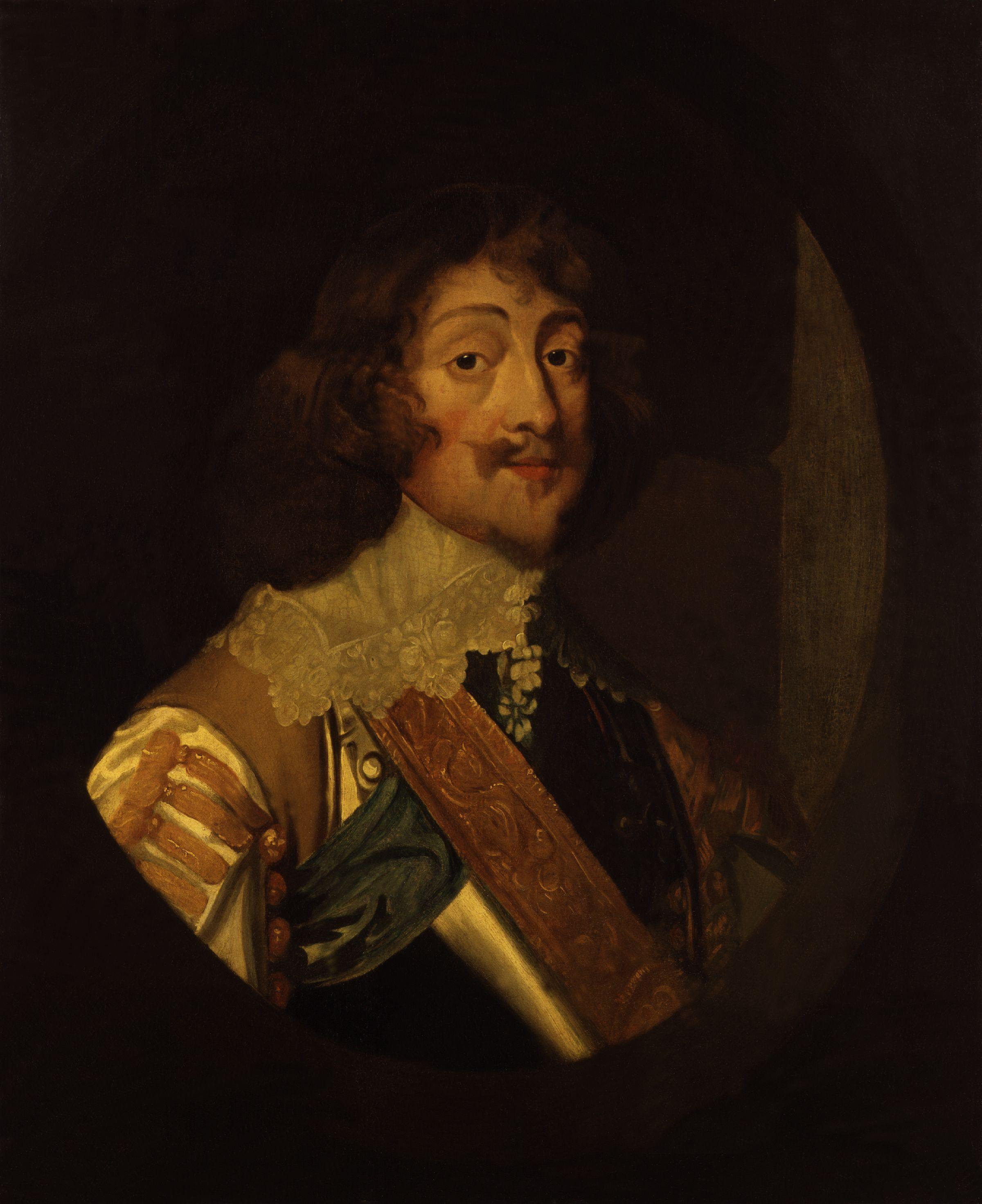
- Henry Rich, 1st Earl of Holland by Anthony van Dyck, circa 1640

Chancellor of the University of Cambridge
- In office 1628–1649

Governor of Windsor Castle and Landguard Fort
- In office 1628–1648

Lord Lieutenant of Berkshire & Middlesex
- In office 1628–1643

Groom of the Stool
- In office 1636–1643

Privy Council of England
- In office 1624–1642

Member of Parliament for Leicester
- In office April 1614 – June 1614

Personal details
- Born: 15 August 1590 (baptised) London
- Died: 9 March 1649 (aged 58) New Palace Yard, Westminster
- Resting place: St Mary Abbots
- Spouse: Isabel (1612 – until his death)
- Children: Frances (1617–1672); Robert (1619–1675); Henry (1620–1669); Isabella (1623–1670); Susannah (1628–1649); Diana (d. 1659); Charles (d. 1645); Cope (1635–1676); Mary (1636–1666)
- Parent(s): Robert Rich, 1st Earl of Warwick; Penelope Devereux
- Education: Emmanuel College, Cambridge
- Occupation: Soldier and courtier

Military service
- Rank: General
- Battles/wars: War of the Jülich Succession; Siege of Jülich (1610); Eighty Years War; Anglo-French War (1627–1629); Siege of Saint-Martin-de-Ré; Wars of the Three Kingdoms; First Battle of Newbury; Battle of St Neots (1648)

Henry Rich, 1st Earl of Holland (baptised 15 August 1590, died 9 March 1649), was an English courtier and politician executed by Parliament after being captured fighting for the Royalists during the Second English Civil War. Younger brother of Robert Rich, 2nd Earl of Warwick, a Puritan activist and commander of the Parliamentarian navy during the Wars of the Three Kingdoms, Henry was better known as an "extravagant, decorative, quarrelsome and highly successful courtier".

A close friend of Charles I and his favourite the Duke of Buckingham, Rich performed various diplomatic errands, including negotiations for Charles' marriage to Henrietta Maria of France in 1625. He took part in the unsuccessful attack on Saint-Martin-de-Ré in 1627 and held a number of important positions at court during the 1630s. When the First English Civil War began in August 1642, Rich remained in London rather than joining the Royalists, but like other moderates became disillusioned with the war. He defected in July 1643 after failing to persuade his cousin and commander-in-chief of the Parliamentarian army, Robert Devereux, 3rd Earl of Essex, to negotiate peace terms.

When Charles agreed a truce with the Catholic Confederation in September 1643, Rich returned to London and narrowly escaped being tried for treason. After peace talks between Charles and Parliament broke down in late 1647, he fought for the Royalists in the Second English Civil War and was captured in July 1648. Having escaped trial previously, he was executed in March 1649, although Rich claimed he had always been faithful to Parliament and never changed the "principles that ever I professed". This was a view shared by many Parliamentarian moderates, particularly after the Execution of Charles I in January 1649.

== Early life ==
Henry Rich, later Lord Holland, was the second son and youngest of four children born to Robert Rich, 1st Earl of Warwick (1559–1619) and his first wife Penelope (1563–1607). His parents separated soon after Henry's birth, although they did not formally divorce until 1605, when Penelope married her long-time partner, Charles Blount, 8th Baron Mountjoy (1563–1606). Penelope was sister of the Earl of Essex, executed for treason in 1601, making Rich a cousin to future Parliamentarian general Robert Devereux, 3rd Earl of Essex.

He had two sisters, Essex (1585–1658) and Lettice (1587–1619) and a brother Robert Rich, 2nd Earl of Warwick (1587–1658). He also had a number of half brothers and sisters, including Penelope (b. 1592), Isabella, Mountjoy Blount, 1st Earl of Newport (1597–1666), and Charles (1605–1627). Almost certainly fathered by Charles Mountjoy, these children were brought up within the Rich family and appear in its pedigree, with the exception of Mountjoy, who was legitimised after his father's death.

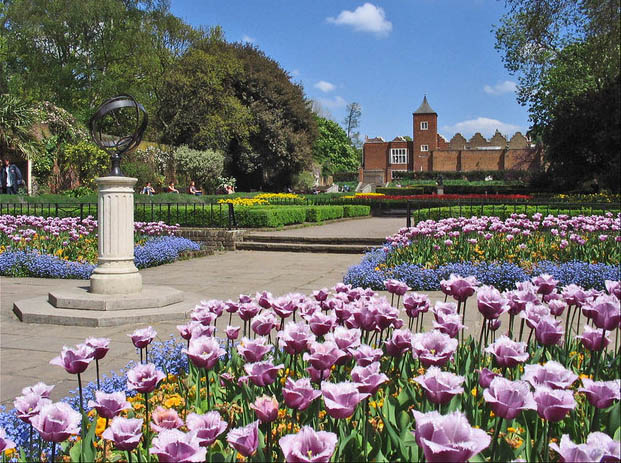
Holland House; remains of the west side in 2004

His father Robert was the wealthiest landowner in Essex, created Earl of Warwick in 1618, and a prominent supporter of reforms within the Church of England, as were his sons. However, while his elder brother was a devout Puritan throughout his life, Henry acquired a reputation as an "extravagant, decorative, quarrelsome and highly successful courtier". In 1610, he went to Paris to take riding lessons with Antoine de Pluvinel.

In 1612, he married Isabel Cope, whose dowry included Cope House in Kensington. This was greatly expanded by Rich in 1624 to 1625 and renamed Holland House; largely destroyed in 1940, parts of the original house still remain. They had numerous children, including Frances (1617–1672), who married William Paget, 5th Baron Paget, Robert (1619–1675), Henry (1620–1669), Isabella (1623–1670), Susannah (1628–1649), Diana (d. 1659), Charles (d. 1645), Cope (1635–1676) and Mary (1636–1666). Several of the family tombs are at St Mary Abbots Church, Kensington.

== Career: pre-1639 ==
Rich was educated at Eton and graduated from Emmanuel College, Cambridge in 1603. Reportedly a godson of Henry IV of France, he travelled to Paris in 1607 before returning to England in 1610. Elected as MP for the vacant seat of Leicester in May, he was knighted in June when James I's heir Henry was created Prince of Wales. Shortly thereafter, he served as a volunteer in the Siege of Jülich (1610), part of the War of the Jülich Succession which preceded the wider conflict of the Thirty Years' War.

As was then common, Rich completed his education by studying law at the Inner Temple in 1611 and was re-elected for Leicester in the short-lived Addled Parliament of 1614. Clarendon later wrote he was ideally suited to the Jacobean era court, being "a very handsome man, of a lovely and winning presence". However, wealth was also a prerequisite; his father-in-law Sir Walter Cope died in 1614 with debts of over £27,000, greatly impacting Rich's ability to advance.

Rich became close to Charles, installed as heir to the throne when Prince Henry died in 1612, as well as his favourite, the Duke of Buckingham. He took part in various diplomatic missions and briefly served as a volunteer in the Eighty Years War, before being created Baron Kensington in 1623. The next year he was made a member of the Privy Council of England, and sent to Paris to help negotiate the marriage contract between Charles and Henrietta Maria of France, a process completed by James Hay. When Charles succeeded his father in March 1625, Hay was made Earl of Carlisle and Rich Earl of Holland, taking his title from an area in Lincolnshire.

In 1627, Rich was involved in the disastrous Siege of Saint-Martin-de-Ré, which led to Buckingham's impeachment by Parliament; although this failed, he was assassinated on 23 August 1628. The next day, Rich wrote to Charles claiming he had been promised the position Governor of Windsor Castle. This request was granted, along with an appointment as Governor of Landguard Fort, and he benefited from his relationship with Henrietta Maria, who had replaced Buckingham as Charles' closest advisor. Over the next few months, he was made Lord Lieutenant of Berkshire and Middlesex, Chancellor of the University of Cambridge, and numerous other offices.

Although he failed to become First Lord of the Admiralty, the 1630s was the highpoint of his career as a courtier; as a Privy councillor, he was frequently consulted on foreign affairs, although his anti-Spanish policy was at odds with that pursued by Charles. In 1636, he was appointed Groom of the Stool; by this stage the term indicated proximity to the monarch rather than function, and the officeholder was an important part of the Royal household.

== Career: Wars of the Three Kingdoms ==
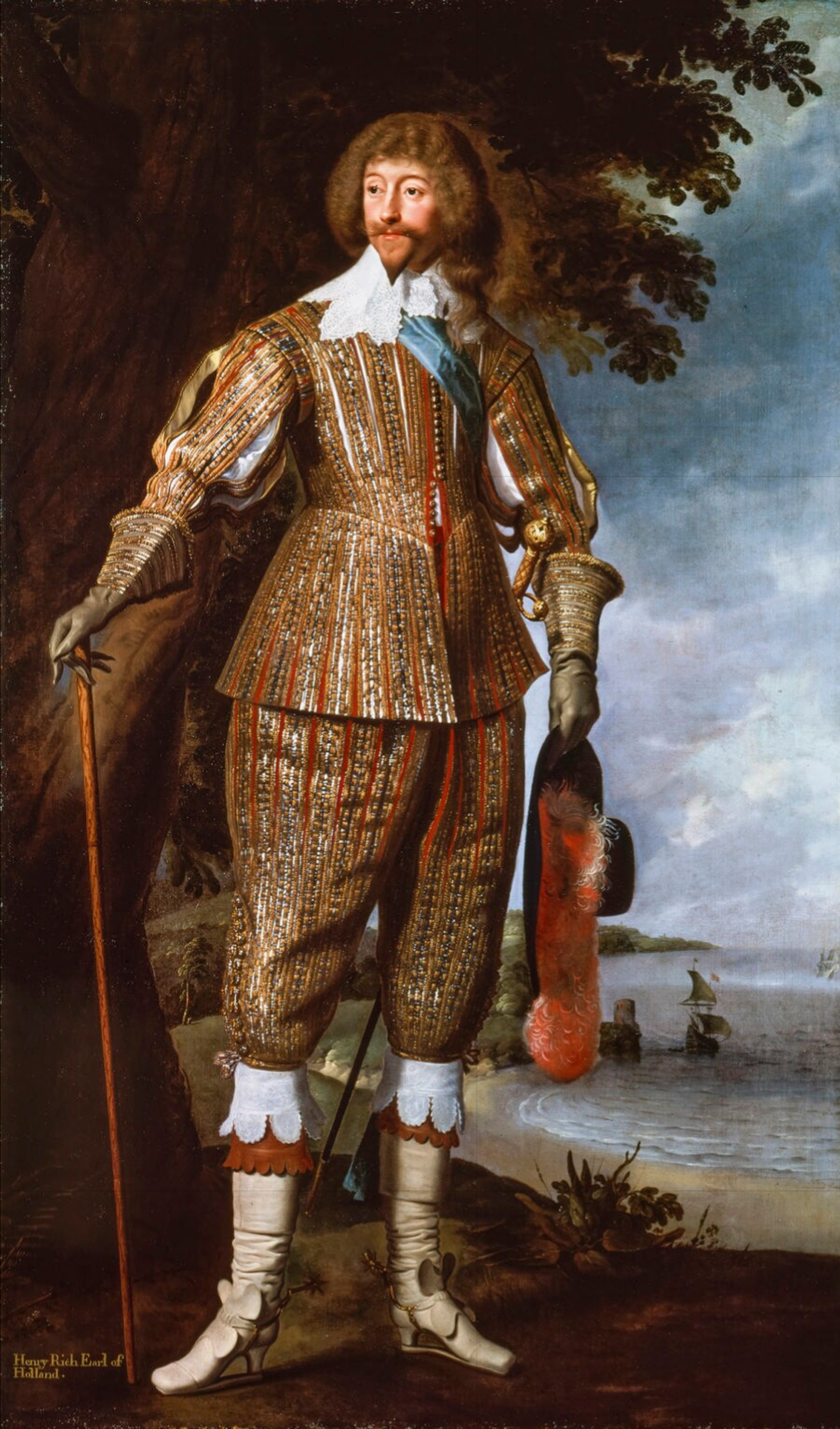
Henry Rich, 1st Earl of Holland

Despite his close links to the court and reputation for extravagance and ambition, Lord Conway described Rich and his brother Warwick as the "temporal and spiritual heads of the Puritans". This shows the danger of conflating "Roundhead" and "Puritan", which often implied a political outlook as much as a moral one. While the majority supported Parliament during the civil war, men like Sir William Savile were equally opposed to Catholicism but became Royalists out of a sense of personal loyalty.

Rich used his patronage to appoint "Godly" clergy, while opposing Laudianism and "Popery", causing a breach with Henrietta Maria, who was a devout Catholic. In addition, he supported two causes central to the Puritan movement, the first being the restoration of Charles' Protestant nephew, Charles I Louis, Elector Palatine, to his hereditary lands in the Electoral Palatinate.

The second was participation in the colonial movement, which sought to establish English possessions in the West Indies and North America, then dominated by Spain. Rich supported colonies in Virginia and Bermuda and from 1630 to 1642 was governor of the Providence Island Company. While his attendance at company meetings was irregular, he helped secure funding and support for its activities, including Privateer attacks on Spanish merchant ships. Many of his colleagues were leaders of the Parliamentarian opposition in 1641, including John Pym, John Hampden, Lord Saye and Lord Brooke.

The Wars of the Three Kingdoms began in 1639 with the first of the two Bishops' Wars against the Scots Covenanters; Rich served as General of Horse in a chaotic campaign that ended without significant action. A second defeat in 1640 forced Charles to recall Parliament in November, which impeached both Archbishop Laud and the Earl of Strafford. A long-time opponent of Strafford, Rich gave evidence against him but abstained from the vote which led to his execution in May 1641.

Although Charles appointed him commander of the militia in Northern England, Rich sided with Parliament at the start of the First English Civil War in August 1642. Many on both sides expected a short, relatively bloodless conflict and were shocked by the casualties incurred at Edgehill in October 1642. In early 1643, Rich tried to persuade his cousin and Army commander Robert Devereux, 3rd Earl of Essex to force Parliament to make peace; when this failed, he defected to the Royalists at Oxford. Although present at Newbury in September, he was treated with indifference by Charles and returned to Westminster in November, reportedly because he opposed the "Cessation" negotiated by Royalists in Ireland with the Catholic Confederacy.

He resumed his seat in the House of Lords, while an attempt to impeach him for treason was blocked by Denzil Holles, head of the "Peace" faction in Parliament. Rich was one of ten lords appointed to the Westminster Assembly, a body established with Scottish representatives to agree reforms for the Church of England. By the time Charles surrendered in June 1646, his opponents were divided between moderates led by Holles who dominated Parliament and radicals within the New Model Army, headed by Oliver Cromwell. After negotiations between the king and Parliament broke down in late 1647, the Scots, English moderates and Royalists created an alliance to restore Charles to the throne. The Second English Civil War began in April 1648.

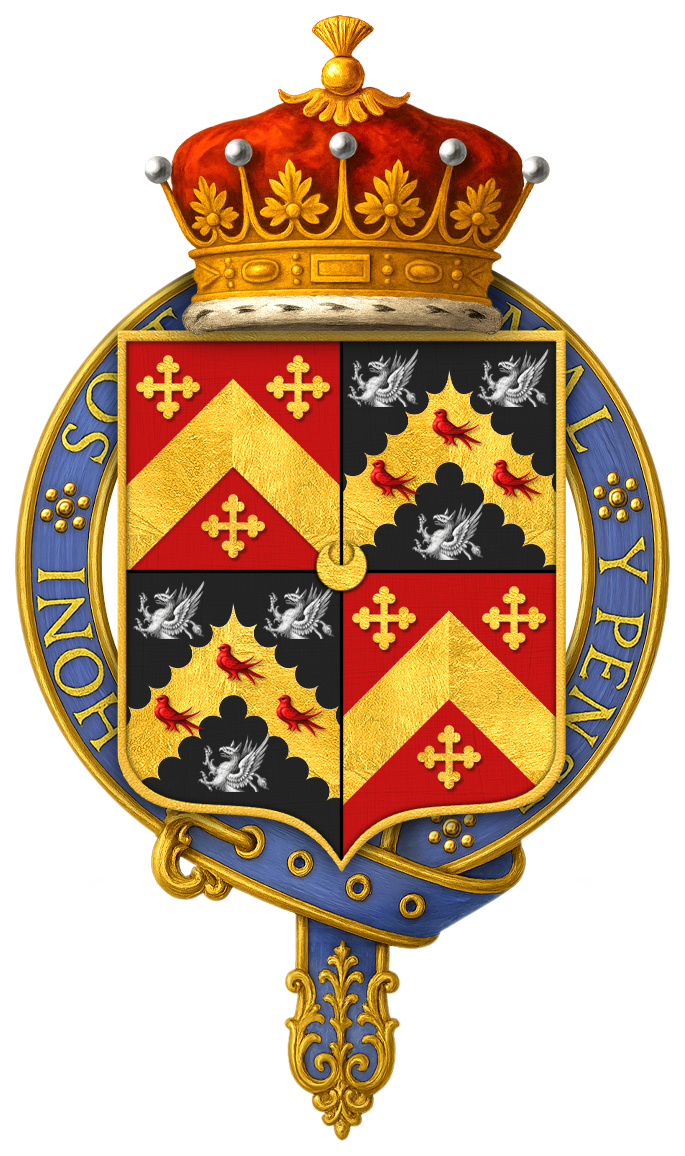
Arms of Henry Rich, 1st Earl of Holland, KG

On 4 July, a petition was presented to Parliament demanding the resumption of negotiations with Charles, and on the same day, Rich and George Villiers, 2nd Duke of Buckingham raised 400 cavalry in an attempt to seize London. This was insufficient for the task and the Royalists retreated through Surrey, before being intercepted and scattered outside Surbiton by Sir Michael Livesey. Rich and 200 men reached St Neots on Sunday 9 July, along with Colonel John Dalbier, an experienced German mercenary who served with him in the 1627 Saint-Martin-de-Ré expedition.

The next day, they were attacked by a detachment from the New Model under Colonel Adrian Scrope; Dalbier was killed, Buckingham escaped to France and Rich taken prisoner to Windsor Castle. The war ended with Parliamentarian victory at Preston in August, followed by the Execution of Charles I on 30 January 1649. On 27 February, Rich was taken to London for trial; many felt he should have been punished in 1643 and despite pleas from his brother Warwick, he was executed on 9 March along with Lord Capell and the Duke of Hamilton.

Shortly before his death, Rich composed a statement arguing he had always been faithful to Parliament, a "remarkable claim for someone who had deserted them twice". However, the suggestion he never changed the "principles that ever I professed" and was more consistent than those responsible for executing Charles was a view shared by many Parliamentarian moderates.

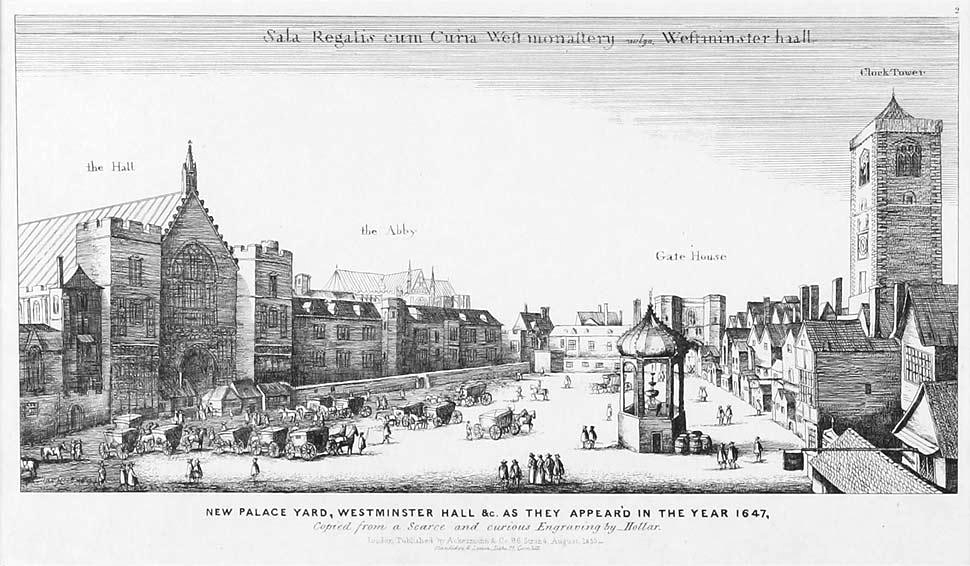
New Palace Yard, the place of execution, in 1647

== Sources ==
- BCW. "The Cessation of Arms". BCW Project.
- Bucholz, RO (2006). The Bedchamber; Groom of the Stole in "Office-Holders in Modern Britain: Volume 11" (Revised), Court Officers, 1660-1837. London University.
- Clarendon, Edward Hyde, 1st Earl of (1704). The History of the Rebellion and Civil Wars in England; Volume I (2019 ed.). Wentworth Press. ISBN 978-0469445765.
- Cracroft's Peerage. "Henry [Rich], 1st Baron Kensington later 1st Earl of Holland, KG PC". Cracrofts Peerage.
- Donagan, Barbara (1976). "A Courtier's Progress: Greed and Consistency in the Life of the Earl of Holland". The Historical Journal. 19 (2): 317–353. doi:10.1017/S0018246X00010190. JSTOR 2638567. S2CID 159941462.
- Hardacre, Paul (1956). The Royalists during the Puritan Revolution. Springer. ISBN 978-9401745635.
- Hopper, Andrew (2010). "The Self-Fashioning of Gentry Turncoats during the English Civil Wars". British History. 49 (2): 236–257. JSTOR 23265201.
- Palmer, William (1982). "Oliver St. John and the Middle Group in the Long Parliament, 1643-1645: A Reappraisal". Albion: A Quarterly Journal Concerned with British Studies. 14 (1): 20–26. doi:10.2307/4048483. JSTOR 4048483.
- Parker, Geoffrey (1997). The Thirty Years' War. Routledge. ISBN 978-0415128834.
- Porter, Stephen (2004). "Dalbier, John (d. 1648)". Oxford Dictionary of National Biography (online ed.). Oxford University Press. doi:10.1093/ref:odnb/7010. (Subscription, Wikipedia Library access or UK public library membership required.)
- Royle, Trevor (2004). Civil War: The Wars of the Three Kingdoms 1638–1660 (2006 ed.). Abacus. ISBN 978-0-349-11564-1.
- Smut, R Malcolm (2004). "Rich, Henry, first earl of Holland (1598-1649)". Oxford Dictionary of National Biography (online ed.). Oxford University Press. doi:10.1093/ref:odnb/23484. (Subscription, Wikipedia Library access or UK public library membership required.)
- Usher, Brett (2004). "Rich, Robert, first earl of Warwick". Oxford Dictionary of National Biography (online ed.). Oxford University Press. doi:10.1093/ref:odnb/61021. (Subscription, Wikipedia Library access or UK public library membership required.)
- Dixhoorn, Chad Van (2007). "Westminster assembly (act. 1643–1652)". Oxford Dictionary of National Biography (online ed.). Oxford University Press. doi:10.1093/ref:odnb/92780. (Subscription, Wikipedia Library access or UK public library membership required.)
- Duinen, Jared Van (2007). The Nature of Puritan Opposition in 1630s England in "Prosopography Approaches" and Applications: A Handbook. University of Oxford Linacre College Unit for Prosopographical Research. ISBN 978-1900934121.
- Watson, Paula; Coates, Ben (2010). RICH, Henry (1590-1649), of Smithfield, London and Kensington, Mdx in "The House of Commons 1604-1629". Cambridge University Press.

Political offices
Preceded by The Viscount Fentoun	Captain of the Yeomen of the Guard; 1617–1632	Succeeded by The Viscount Dupplin
Preceded by The Duke of Buckingham	Master of the Horse; 1628	Succeeded by The Marquess of Hamilton
Preceded by The Earl of Banbury	Lord Lieutenant of Berkshire; 1628–1643; With: The Earl of Banbury 1628–1632	Interregnum
Preceded by The Duke of Buckingham	Lord Lieutenant of Middlesex; 1628–1643; With: The Earl of Dorset 1628–1642	Interregnum
Legal offices
Preceded by The Earl of Pembroke	Justice in Eyre south of the Trent; 1631–1649	Vacant
Parliament of England
Preceded by William Skipwith; Henry Beaumont	Member of Parliament for Leicester; 1610–1621; With: Henry Beaumont 1610–1614, Francis Leigh 1614–1621	Succeeded by Sir Richard Moryson; Sir William Herrick
Peerage of England
New creation	Earl of Holland; 1624–1649	Succeeded by Robert Rich
New creation	Baron Kensington; 1623–1649	Succeeded by Robert Rich
