= Francis Edwardes =

Francis Edwardes (died 15 December 1725) of Pembrokeshire in Wales, was a Member of Parliament.

== Origins ==
He was the second son of Owen Edwardes of Treffgarne, Pembrokeshire. The Edwardes family owned extensive lands in Pembrokeshire, Carmarthenshire and Cardiganshire in Wales.

== Career ==
He was elected as a Member of Parliament for Haverfordwest in 1722, which seat he held until 1725.

== Marriage and children ==
He married Lady Elizabeth Rich, daughter of Robert Rich, 5th Earl of Warwick, 2nd Earl of Holland (1620–1675) and the heiress of her nephew Edward Henry Rich, 7th Earl of Warwick, 4th Earl of Holland (1697–1721). Through this marriage the substantial Rich estates, including Holland House in Kensington, came into the Edwardes family. By his wife he had children including:

- William Edwardes, 1st Baron Kensington (c.1711-1801), second surviving son, a Member of Parliament for Haverfordwest who was elevated to the Peerage of Ireland as Baron Kensington in 1776.

== Death and burial ==
Edwardes died in December 1725.

== See also ==
- Earl of Warwick
- Earl of Holland

Parliament of Great Britain
Preceded by Sir John Philipps	Member of Parliament for Haverfordwest; 1722–1725	Succeeded by Sir Erasmus Philipps
