= Robert Rich, 1st Earl of Warwick =

English nobleman

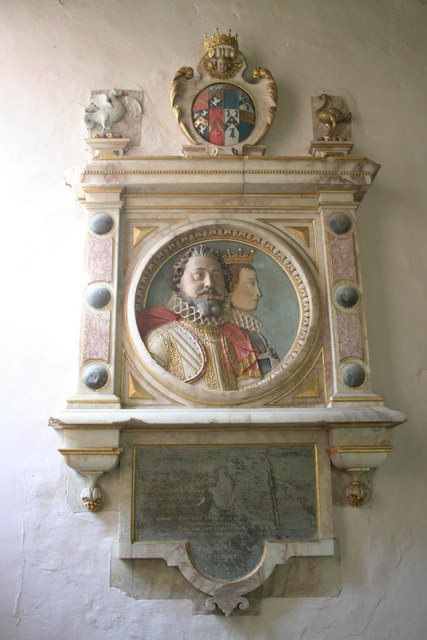
Mural monument to Robert Rich, 1st Earl of Warwick and his second wife Frances Wray. St Lawrence's Church, Snarford, Lincolnshire

Arms of Rich: Gules, a chevron between three crosses botonée or

Robert Rich, 3rd Baron Rich, 1st Earl of Warwick (December 1559 – 24 March 1619), was an English nobleman, known as Baron Rich between 1581 and 1618, when he was created Earl of Warwick. He was the first husband of Penelope Devereux, whom he divorced in 1605 on the grounds of her adultery.

== Origins ==
Rich was the son and heir of Robert Rich, 2nd Baron Rich (c. 1538–1581) by his wife Elizabeth Baldry, a daughter of George Baldry. He was the grandson of Richard Rich, 1st Baron Rich, the progenitor of the powerful Rich family.

== Career ==
Rich succeeded his father in the barony in 1581. In 1618, he was created Earl of Warwick.

== Marriages and progeny ==
He married twice: His first marriage was on 10 January 1581 to Lady Penelope Devereux (January 1563 – 7 July 1607), a daughter of Walter Devereux, 1st Earl of Essex. In 1605, Lord Rich was granted a divorce from his wife, who admitted adultery with Charles Blount, 8th Baron Mountjoy. By Penelope, Rich had seven children:

- Robert Rich, 2nd Earl of Warwick (1587–1658), eldest son and heir.
- Henry Rich, 1st Earl of Holland (1590–1649), second son.
- Sir Charles Rich (d. 1627), died unmarried and without issue
- Lettice Rich (d. 1619), named after her maternal grandmother Lettice Knollys. Married firstly (as his second wife) Sir George Carey (c.1541-1616) of Cockington in the parish of Tor Mohun in Devon, Lord Deputy of Ireland, without issue; secondly to Sir Arthur Lake, MP.
- Penelope Rich, married Gervase Clifton, 1st Baronet
- Essex Rich, married Sir Thomas Cheek and had three sons and five daughters
- Isabella Rich, married Sir John Smythe, son of Sir Thomas Smythe, first Governor of the East India Company.

His second marriage, in 1616, was to Frances Wray (1568–1634), widow of Sir George St Paul, 1st Baronet, and second daughter of Sir Christoper Wray, Lord Chief Justice to Queen Elizabeth I. Wray was described as "a person of shining conversation and eminent bounty"; she survived her second husband and in her second widowhood was one of the richest women in Lincolnshire. Neither of her marriages produced children. She died at Snarford in 1634 aged 66.

== Death and succession ==
He died in March 1619, aged 59, and was succeeded in the earldom by his eldest son Robert Rich, 2nd Earl of Warwick (1587–1658).

Peerage of England
New creation	Earl of Warwick; 1618–1619	Succeeded by Robert Rich
Preceded by Robert Rich	Baron Rich; 1581–1619	Succeeded by Robert Rich
