= Margaret de Beaumont, 7th Countess of Warwick =

Margaret de Beaumont, 7th Countess of Warwick or Margaret de Neubourg or Margery de Newburgh (died 3 June 1253) was the daughter of Henry de Beaumont, 5th Earl of Warwick and Margaret D'Oyly. She was the sister and heiress of Thomas de Beaumont, 6th Earl of Warwick and became the 7th Countess of Warwick in her own right. She married firstly John Marshal (died October 1242) and, secondly, John de Plessis. The latter was a great favourite of King Henry III of England who, in 1247, created him the 7th Earl of Warwick and subsequently Count of Warwick. He died on 20 February 1263. There was no issue by either of these marriages and so, at Margaret's death, the estates passed to her cousin, William Mauduit, who became the 8th Earl.

Peerage of England
Preceded by Thomas de Beaumont	Countess of Warwick; 1242–1253	Succeeded by William Mauduit
