= Leopold Greville, 6th Earl of Warwick =

British officer (1882–1928)

The Right Honourable The Earl of Warwick CMG MVO
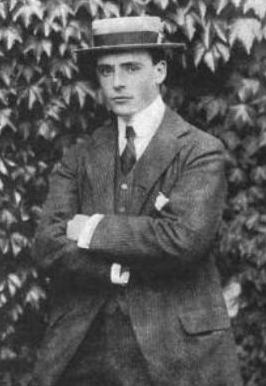
- In The Sketch, 29 August 1900

Personal details
- Born: Leopold Guy Francis Maynard Greville; 10 September 1882
- Died: 31 January 1928 (aged 45) Hove, East Sussex, England
- Spouse: Elfrida Marjorie Eden (m. 1909)
- Children: Charles Greville, 7th Earl of Warwick; Richard Greville; John Greville
- Parent(s): Francis Greville, 5th Earl of Warwick; Daisy Maynard
- Education: Eton College

Military service
- Branch/service: The King's Royal Rifle Corps
- Rank: Brigadier-general
- Commands: 4th Canadian Infantry Brigade; 12th Canadian Infantry Brigade
- Battles/wars: Second Boer War; First World War

Leopold Guy Francis Maynard Greville, 6th Earl of Warwick CMG MVO (10 September 1882 – 31 January 1928), styled Lord Brooke between 1893 and 1924, was a British officer.

== Early life ==
Greville was born on 10 September 1882, the son of Francis Greville, 5th Earl of Warwick and his wife, the former Daisy Maynard. He was likely the only child of Lady Warwick who was fathered by the Earl.

He was educated at Eton, he eventually ran away from the school, supposedly selling his fur coat and gun to travel to join the Second Boer War.

He succeeded his father in the earldom in January 1924.

== Military service ==
Lord Brooke was a second lieutenant in the 7th (Militia) Battalion of The King's Royal Rifle Corps, and was seconded for service with a line battalion in March 1900. He fought in the Second Boer War (1899–1901), and was transferred to the Life Guards on 3 November 1900. From August 1901 he served as Aide-de-Camp to Lord Milner, High Commissioner for South Africa, an appointment he held until late 1902. He was also a Reuters correspondent during the Russo-Japanese War (1904–1905). In 1907 he was Aide-de-Camp to the Inspector-General of the Forces. In 1905 he was appointed a Member of the Royal Victorian Order (MVO).

During the First World War he was Aide-de-Camp to the General Officer Commanding of the British Expeditionary Force from 1914 until 1915. He was then promoted to Brigadier General later that year, on 25 June, and commanded 4th Canadian Infantry Brigade and then 12th Canadian Infantry Brigade until wounded on 12 September 1916. After recovering, he served in Paris with the Canadian Mission.

=== Death ===
He died at a nursing home in Hove on 31 January 1928.

== Personal life ==
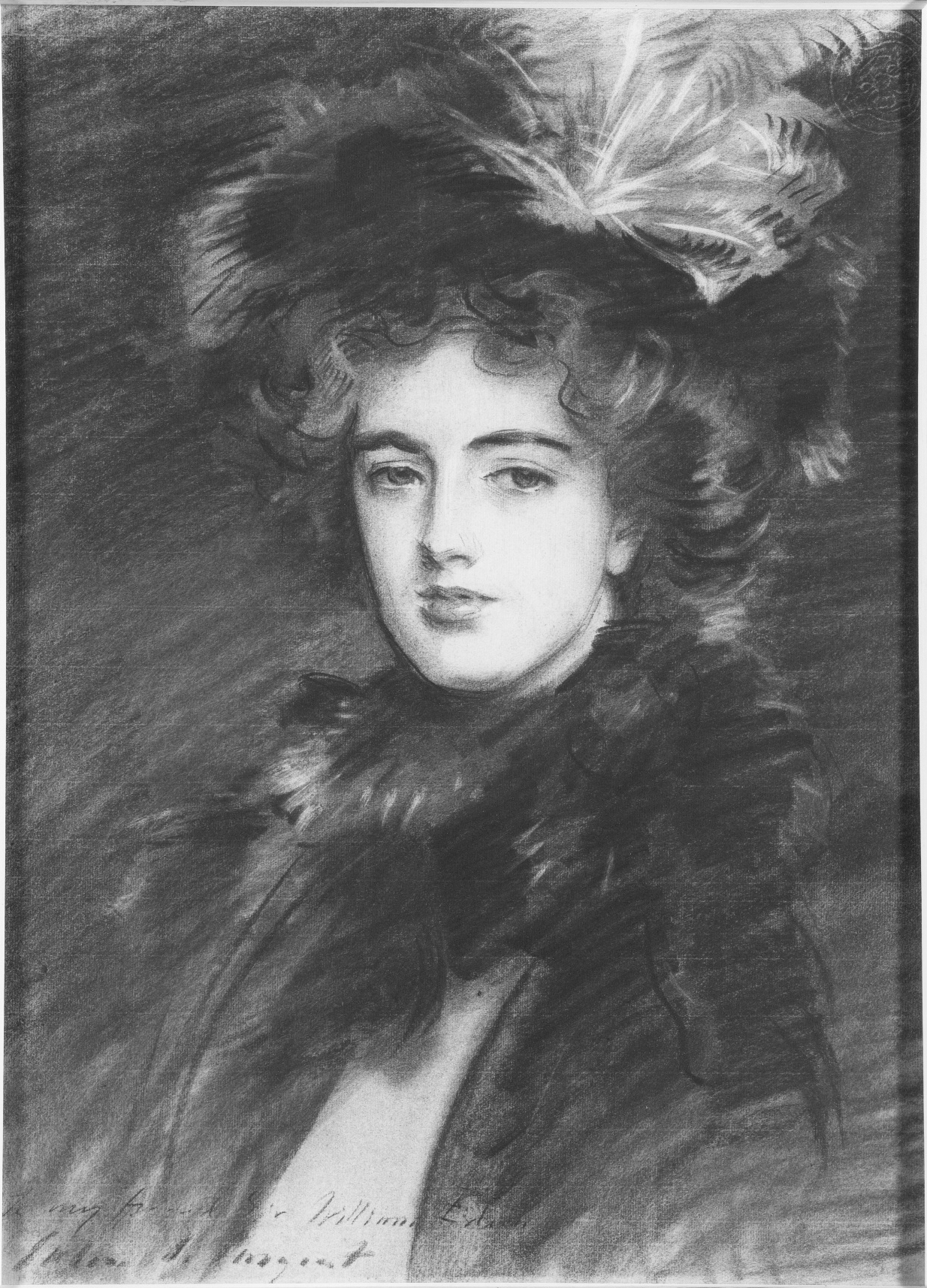
Marjorie Eden, Lady Brooke, later Countess of Warwick (1887–1943) (John Singer Sargent)

On 29 April 1909, Lord Warwick married Elfrida Marjorie Eden (1887–1943). She was the only daughter of Sir William Eden, 7th Baronet and Sybil Frances Grey (a daughter Sir William Grey KCSI by his second wife). Together, Lord Warwick and Elfrida were the parents of three sons:

- Charles Guy Fulke Greville, 7th Earl of Warwick (1911–1984).
- Richard Francis Maynard Greville (1913–1968), who served as a Governor of University College Hospital from 1952 to 1968.
- John Ambrose Henry Greville (1918–1942), who was killed in action.

After his death, his widow, the Countess of Warwick served as Mayor of Warwick in 1929, 1930 and 1931 before her death on 10 February 1943. She was sister of future Prime Minister Anthony Eden, who was also Warwick's local MP.

== Selected works ==
- An Eye-witness in Manchuria (1905). London: E. Nash.

Peerage of Great Britain
Preceded by Francis Greville	Earl Brooke; Earl of Warwick; 1924–1928	Succeeded by Charles Greville
