= Francis Greville, 3rd Baron Brooke =

- Born: 1637
- Died: November 1658 (aged 20–21)
- Occupation: Aristocrat
- Parent(s): Robert Greville, 2nd Baron Brooke; Catherine Greville

Francis Greville, 3rd Baron Brooke (1637–1658) supported the Parliamentary (Roundhead) cause in the English Civil War.

== Biography ==
Francis Greville was the eldest son and heir of Robert Greville, 2nd Baron Brooke and his wife Catharine, daughter of Francis Russell, 4th Earl of Bedford.

Greville served as recorder of Warwick.

Greville died unmarried in 1658, and was succeeded in turn by his two brothers, Robert, 4th Baron Brooke, (died 1676) and Fulke, 5th Baron Brooke (died 22 Oct 1710).

== Notes ==
Peerage of England
Preceded by Robert Greville	Baron Brooke; 1643–1658	Succeeded by Robert Greville
