= George Greville, 4th Earl of Warwick =

English Tory politician, bibliophile and collector

The Right Honourable The Earl of Warwick MP
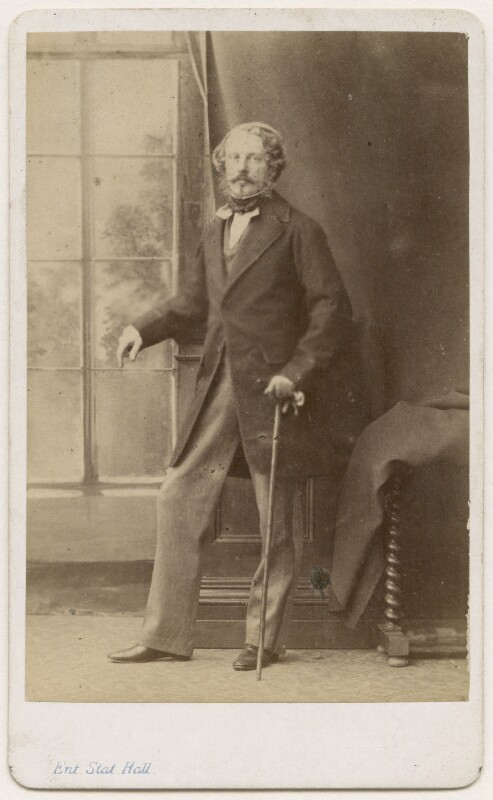
- Photograph by Bernieri, c. 1868

Member of Parliament for South Warwickshire
- In office 1845–1853
- Preceded by: Sir John Mordaunt; Evelyn John Shirley
- Succeeded by: Evelyn Philip Shirley; Lord Guernsey

Personal details
- Born: George Guy Greville; 18 March 1818 Berkeley Square, London, United Kingdom
- Died: 2 December 1893 (aged 75) Warwick Castle, Warwick, United Kingdom
- Party: Tory
- Spouse: Lady Anne Charteris (m. 1853; died 1893)
- Relations: John Savile, 2nd Earl of Mexborough (grandfather)
- Children: 5, including Francis and Sidney
- Parent(s): Henry Greville, 3rd Earl of Warwick; Sarah Elizabeth Monson, Lady Monson (formerly Lady Sarah Elizabeth Savile)
- Education: St John's College, Oxford

George Guy Greville, 4th Earl of Warwick, 4th Earl Brooke (28 March 1818 – 2 December 1893), styled Lord Brooke from 1818 to 1853, was an English Tory politician, bibliophile and collector.

== Early life ==
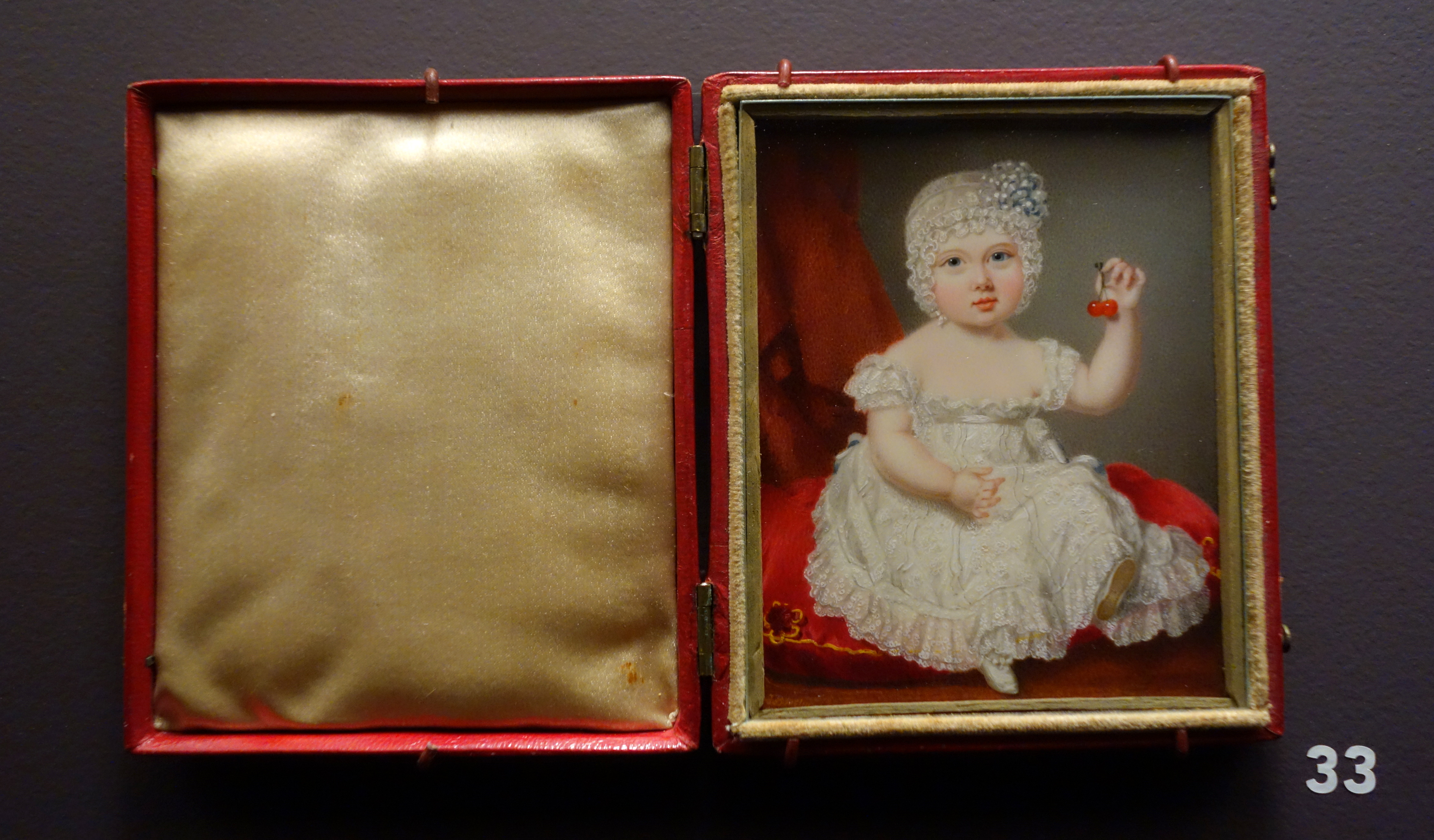
George Guy Greville, Lord Brooke, as a Child, by John Bradley, c. 1819.

Greville was born in Charles Street, Berkeley Square, London. He was the only child of Henry Greville, 3rd Earl of Warwick, and the former Lady Sarah Elizabeth Savile. Before his parents' marriage, his mother had been widowed from John George Monson, 4th Baron Monson of Burton. From that marriage, he had an elder half-brother, Frederick John Monson, 5th Baron Monson.

His paternal grandparents were George Greville, 2nd Earl of Warwick, and, his second wife, the former Henrietta Vernon (the eldest daughter of Richard Vernon and the Countess of Upper Ossory). His maternal grandparents were John Savile, 2nd Earl of Mexborough and the former Elizabeth Stephenson (a daughter of Henry Stephenson). His maternal uncle was John Savile, 3rd Earl of Mexborough, an MP for Pontefract.

He was educated at St John's College, Oxford, from where he obtained a BA in 1839.

== Career ==
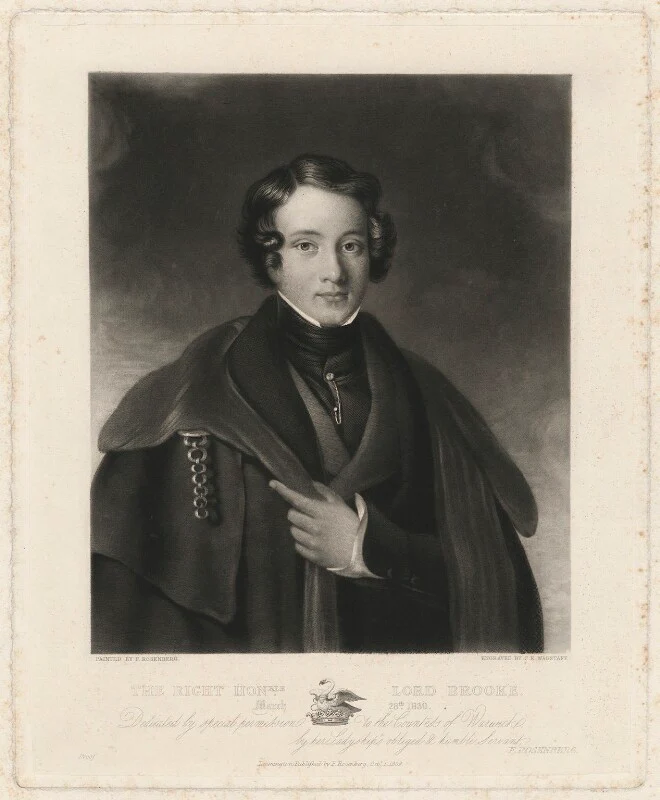
George Guy Greville, 4th Earl of Warwick in 1839.

He was Member of Parliament (MP) for South Warwickshire from 1845 to 1853, when he succeeded to the peerage. He served as honorary colonel to the Warwickshire Yeomanry cavalry, and as A.D.C. to Queen Victoria.

He joined the Canterbury Association on 11 February 1850 and was, from the day of joining, a member of the management committee.

=== Collector ===
Lord Warwick was also a prolific contributor to the improvements of Warwick Castle during the nineteenth century. Alongside his artistic wife, Anne Charteris 4th Countess of Warwick, he oversaw the redecoration of the castle's Great Hall and domestic apartments after the fire of 1871. The celebrated architect Anthony Salvin was employed to rebuild the hall in the typical Victorian 'Gothic' taste, embellished with stained glass to achieve the effect of a medieval baronial hall. The domestic apartments were also redesigned, with each room assigned a different 'historical' style, typical of the nineteenth century interest in the 'Romantic Interior'.

Known as a prolific collector of books, Lord Warwick established a Shakespeare Library at Warwick Castle with the help of James Halliwell-Phillipps during the years 1852–1870. The entire contents of the library was sold after his death in 1897 to the Folger Shakespeare Library, Washington, D.C.

Lord Warwick was also a great collector of arms and armour, most of which was purchased through the New Bond Street dealer and forger Samuel Luke Pratt (1805–1878). Many of the greatest pieces were acquired by Pratt from the dispersed collection of Samuel Rush Meyrick and later sold to Greville. Alongside original pieces Pratt sold the Earl several Victorian forgeries, a practice that was commonplace for dealers at the time.

== Personal life ==
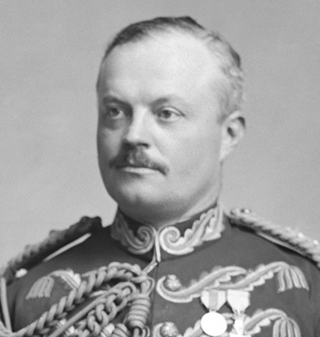
His second son, Hon. Alwyn, at Queen Victoria's Diamond Jubilee, 24 June 1897

On 18 February 1852, he married Lady Anne Charteris (1829–1903), daughter of Francis Wemyss-Charteris, 9th Earl of Wemyss of Gosford House, and the former Lady Louisa Bingham (a daughter of the 2nd Earl of Lucan). Together, they were the parents of five children:

- Francis Greville, 5th Earl of Warwick (1853–1924), who married Frances Evelyn Maynard, daughter of Charles Henry Maynard, in 1881.
- Hon. Alwyn Henry Fulke Greville (1854–1929), who was Equerry-in-Waiting to Prince Albert Victor, Duke of Clarence and Avondale; he married Mabel Elizabeth Georgina Smith OBE (d. 1940), only daughter of Ernald Mosley Smith of Selsdon Park (son of banker George Robert Smith), in 1888.
- Hon. Louis Greville (1856–1941), the High Sheriff of Wiltshire in 1920 who married Lily Gordon (d. 1898), a daughter of J. H. Gordon, in 1887.
- Lady Eva Greville (1860–1940), who married Col. Frank Dugdale CVO, second son of James Dugdale of Wroxall Abbey, in 1895.
- Hon. Sidney Greville (1866–1927), who served as Private Secretary to Queen Alexandra.

He died at Warwick Castle on 2 December 1893.

== See also ==
- Earl of Warwick
- List of owners of Warwick Castle

Parliament of the United Kingdom
Preceded by Sir John Mordaunt; Evelyn John Shirley	Member of Parliament for South Warwickshire; 1845–1853; With: Evelyn John Shirley to 1849; Lord Guernsey from 1849	Succeeded by Evelyn Philip Shirley; Lord Guernsey
Peerage of Great Britain
Preceded by Henry Greville	Earl Brooke; Earl of Warwick; 4th creation 1853–1893	Succeeded by Francis Greville
