= Sarah Greville, Countess of Warwick =

The Right Honourable The Countess of Warwick
- Born: Lady Sarah Elizabeth Savile; 4 February 1786
- Died: 30 January 1851 (aged 64); Clifton Gardens, London
- Spouse(s): John Monson, 4th Baron Monson (m. 1807; died 1809) Henry Greville, 3rd Earl of Warwick (m. 1816; died 1851)
- Children: Frederick Monson, 5th Baron Monson; George Greville, 4th Earl of Warwick
- Parent(s): John Savile, 2nd Earl of Mexborough; Elizabeth Stephenson
- Relatives: John Savile, 3rd Earl of Mexborough (brother)

Sarah Greville, Countess of Warwick (born Lady Sarah Elizabeth Savile; 4 February 1786 – 30 January 1851), formerly Lady Monson, was the wife of Henry Greville, 3rd Earl of Warwick.

== Early life ==
Lady Sarah was the daughter of John Savile, 2nd Earl of Mexborough and his wife, the former Elizabeth Stephenson. The family home was at Methley Park, near Leeds. Her mother, the Countess of Mexborough, died in 1821. Lady Sarah's elder brother, John, at the time known as Viscount Pollington, served as MP for Pontefract and became the 3rd Earl on the death of their father, in 1830.

== Personal life ==
On 30 October 1807, Lady Sarah married John George Monson, 4th Baron Monson of Burton, becoming Lady Monson. Before her husband died in 1809, aged 24, they were the parents of one son:

- Frederick John Monson, 5th Baron Monson of Burton, who married Theodosia Blacker, the fifth and youngest daughter of Maj. Latham Blacker, in 1832. She became a prominent a promoter of women's rights.

Frederick died childless in 1841.

=== Second marriage ===
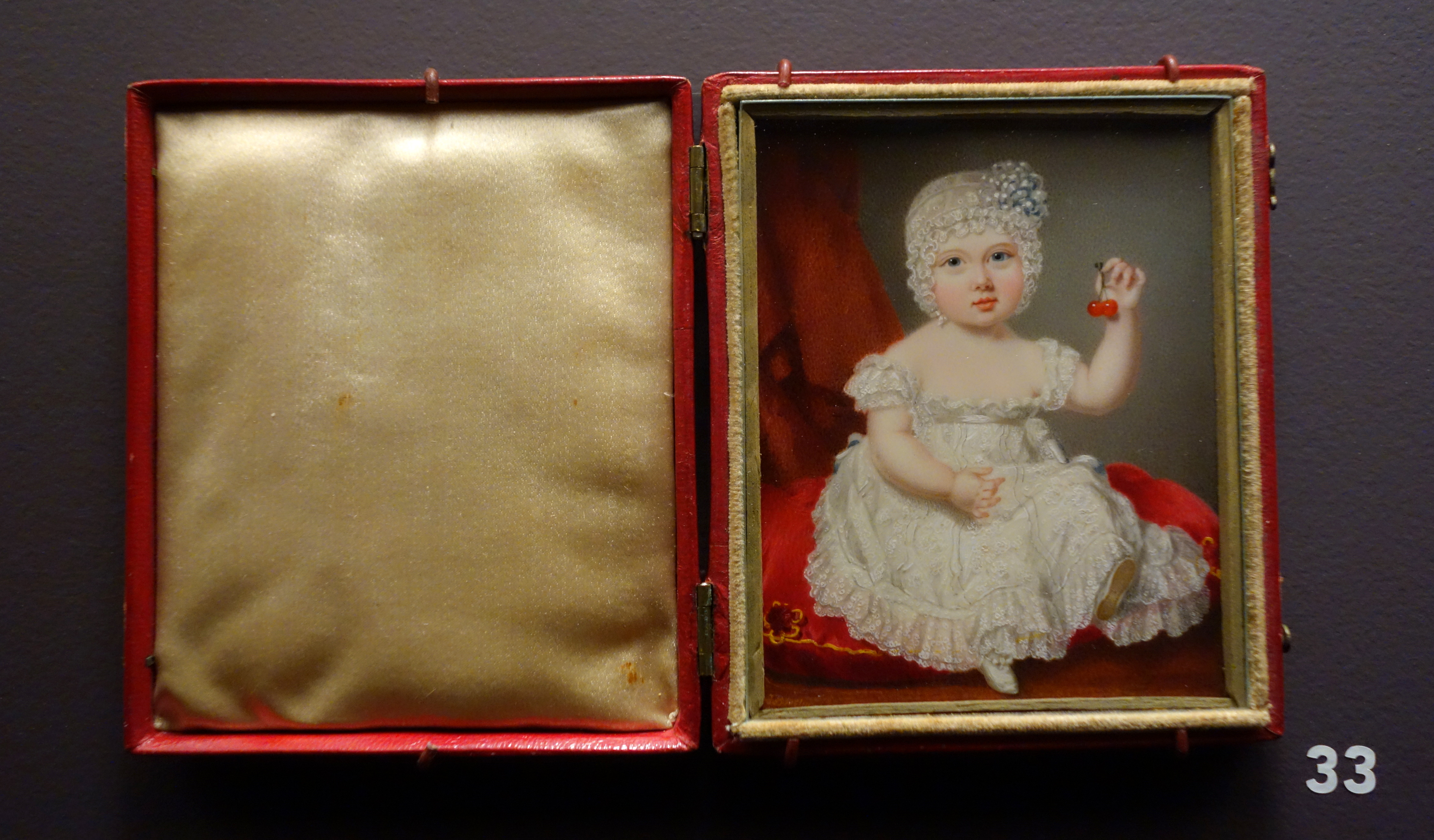
Portrait of her son, George Guy Greville, Lord Brooke, as a Child, by John Bradley, c. 1819.

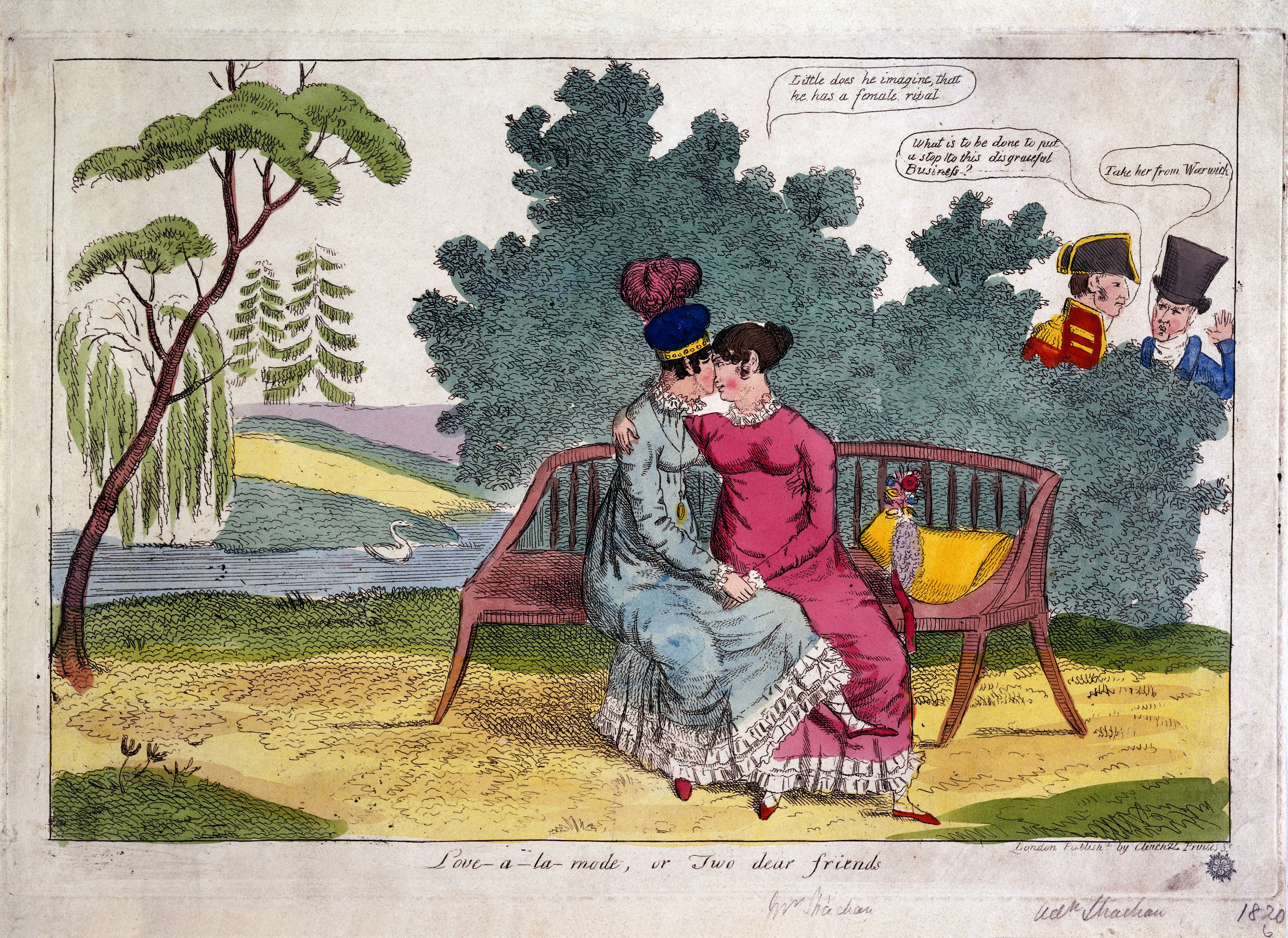
Lady Strachan and Lady Warwick making love in a park, while their husbands look on with disapproval. Coloured etching, c. 1820

On 21 October 1816, Lady Monson remarried, at St. James's, Westminster, to Henry Greville, 3rd Earl of Warwick, becoming Countess of Warwick. They had one son:

- George Guy Greville, 4th Earl of Warwick (1818–1893), known during his father's lifetime as Lord Brooke; he married Lady Anne Charteris, a daughter of Francis Wemyss-Charteris, 9th Earl of Wemyss and the former Lady Louisa Bingham (a daughter of the 2nd Earl of Lucan) in 1852.

After the death of her elder son, Lord Monson, the countess continued to use his seat at Gatton Park as an occasional home. Amongst her contributions to the interiors there was the commissioning of Joseph Severn to paint a scheme of frescos to decorate the main halls, which included figures of her sons incorporated into the scheme. Although celebrated in their day, the wall paintings were destroyed by a disastrous fire in 1934. She was considered a notable philanthropist, her obituary saying:

"The life of this estimable lady was spent in one undiminishing and unceasing course of charity, kindness and benevolence; which was equally felt in the neighbourhood of Warwick Castle, and in the vicinity of her son Lord Monson's mansion at Gatton."

She died in January 1851, at Clifton Gardens, in London, aged 64, and was buried in St Andrew's churchyard, at Gatton. Her husband survived her by two years, dying in August 1853, aged 74. He was succeeded to the earldom by their son.
