= Charles Mills (1755–1826) =

British politician and East India Company director

Charles Mills (13 July 1755 – 29 January 1826) was a British Member of Parliament and a Director of the East India Company.

He was the second son of the Revd. John Mills, rector of Barford and Oxhill, Warwickshire and educated at Rugby. He was a partner in the private bank Glyn's and from 1785 to 1815 was also a director of the East India Company, before becoming deputy chairman. In 1858, he was one of the EIC directors appointed to the Council of India.

Mills was elected MP for Warwick from 1802 to 1826.

He married his sister-in-law Jane, the daughter of the Hon. Wriothesley Digby of Meriden, Warwickshire. He had no children and was succeeded by his nephews.

Parliament of the United Kingdom
Preceded by Samuel Robert Gaussen; Hon. George Villiers	Member of Parliament for Warwick; 1802–1826; With: Lord Brooke 1802–16; Charles John Greville from 1816	Succeeded by Charles John Greville; John Tomes
