= Henry Greville, 3rd Earl of Warwick =

British Tory politician

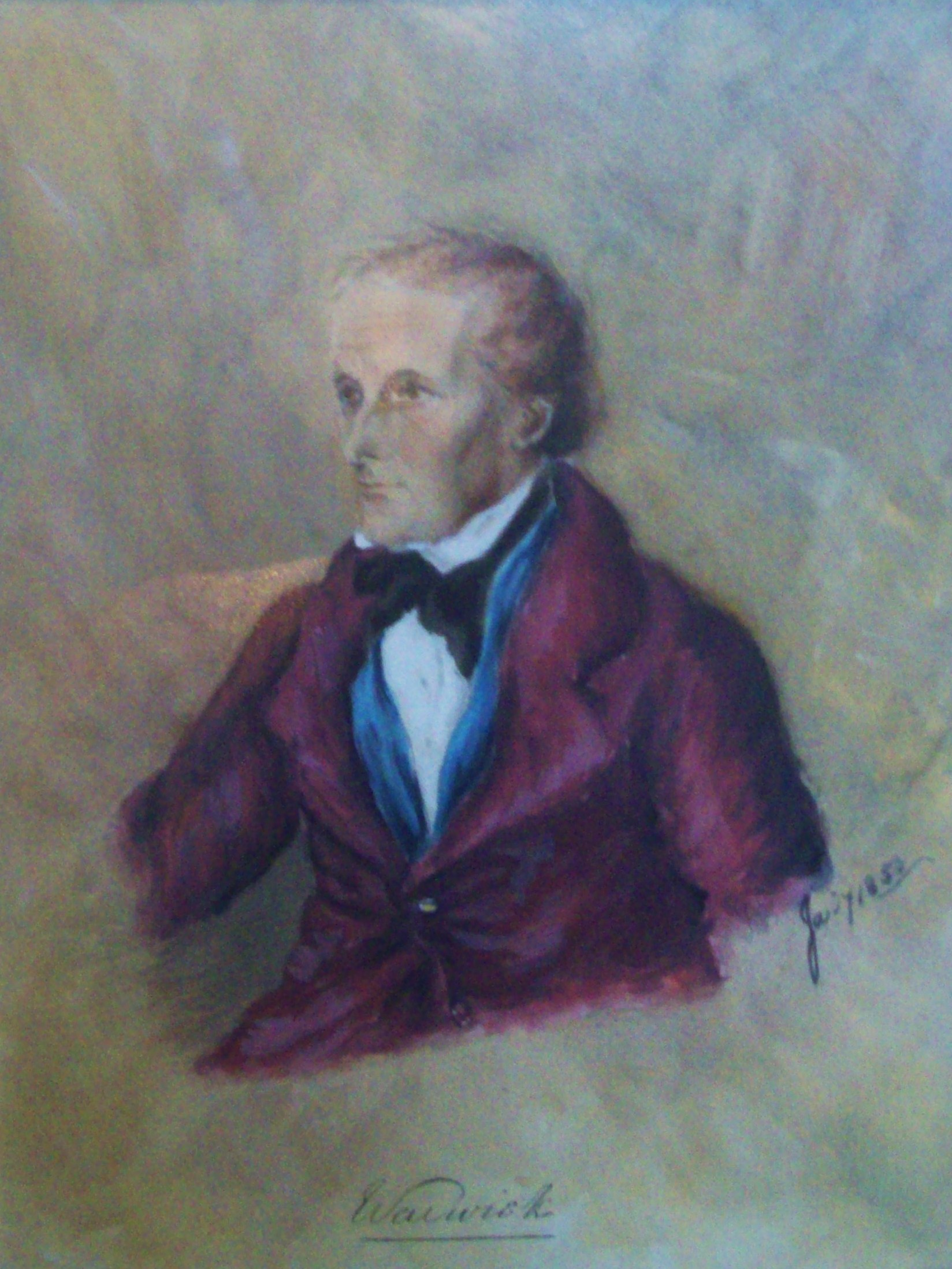
Portrait of Henry Greville by Lady Anne Greville, January 1852.

Henry Richard Greville, 3rd Earl of Warwick, 3rd Earl Brooke, KT (29 March 1779 – 10 August 1853), styled Lord Brooke from 1786 to 1816, was a British Tory politician.

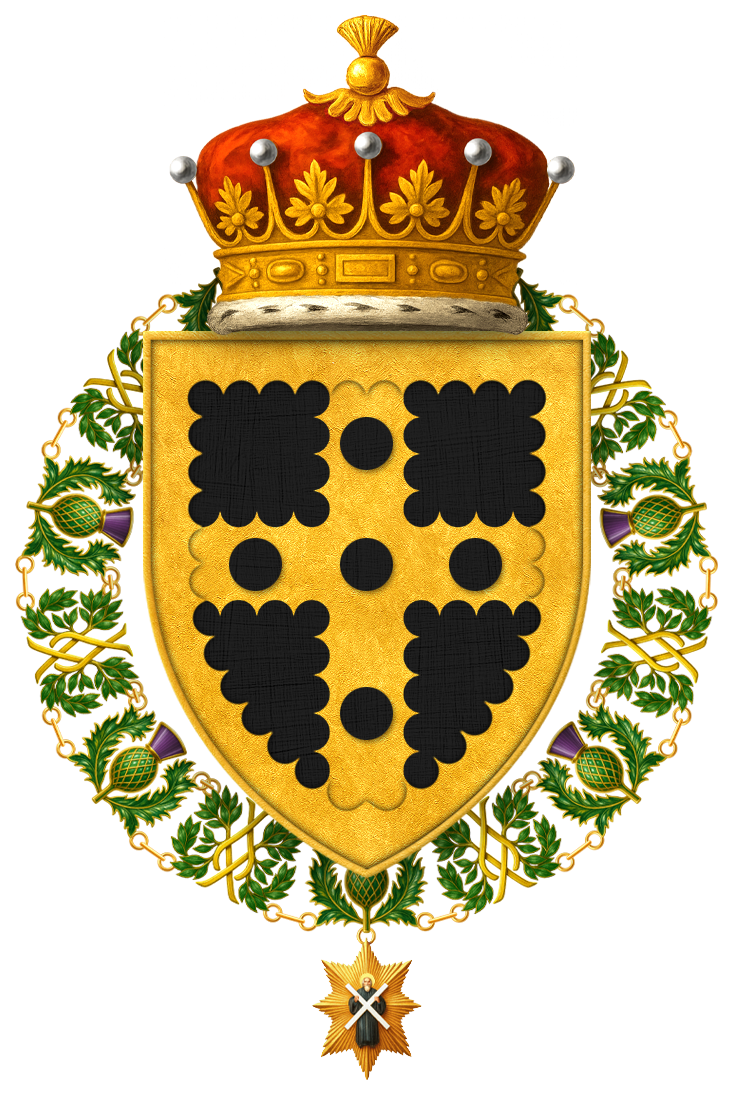
Shield of Arms of Henry Richard Greville, 3rd Earl of Warwick, 3rd Earl Brooke, KT

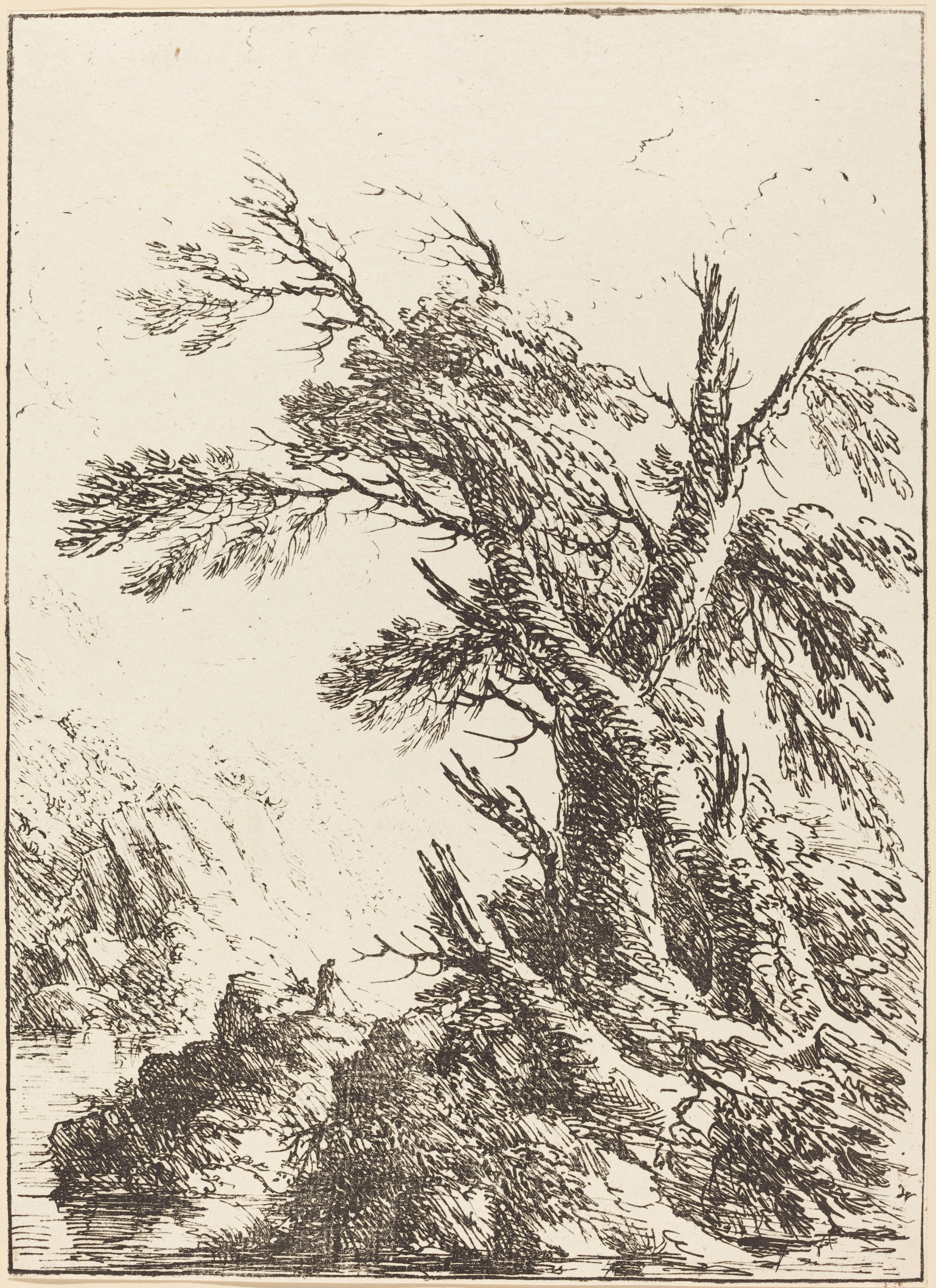
Landscape with Old Trees by Water, lithograph, 1803

== Life ==
Warwick was the son of George Greville, 2nd Earl of Warwick, by his second wife Henrietta (née Vernon), and was educated at Winchester. Henry undertook an extensive Grand Tour between June 1801 and August 1803, his travels taking him to Copenhagen, Saint Petersburg, Moscow, Berlin, Prague, Vienna, Switzerland and throughout Italy. In March 1803 he joined Sir William Drummond and George Hamilton-Gordon, 4th Earl of Aberdeen, on Captain Sir John Gore's ship HMS Medusa to bring Drummond to Constantinople. Henry undertook another tour to Italy during the late 1820s, where he purchased a set of Pietra Dure tables from the Grimanni Palace in Venice, a set which were sold by Merlin Entertainments at Sotheby's in 2015.

He entered Parliament as one of two representatives for Warwick in 1802, a seat he held until he succeeded his father in the earldom in 1816. He served as a Lord-in-waiting (government whip in the House of Lords) from 1841 to 1846 in the second Tory administration of Sir Robert Peel. Warwick was also a Recorder of Warwick between 1816 and 1813, Lord-Lieutenant of Warwickshire between 1822 and 1853 and a Lord of the Bedchamber between 1828 and 1830. In 1827 he was made a Knight of the Thistle.

In 1803 his father, as lord-lieutenant, had commissioned him as Colonel of the Warwickshire Militia, which served in home defence. He remained in command after the regiment was disembodied at the end of the Napoleonic Wars, and continued through the following Long Peace until his death.

He was also an amateur artist. His print Landscape with Old Trees by Water—one of the first lithographs made in Britain—was published in the portfolio Specimens of Polyautography in 1803.

Lord Warwick married Lady Sarah Elizabeth, daughter of John Savile, 2nd Earl of Mexborough, and widow of John Monson, 3rd Baron Monson, in 1816. She died in January 1851, aged 64. Warwick survived her by two years and died in August 1853, aged 74. He was succeeded in the earldom by his son George.

== See also ==
- Earl of Warwick
- List of owners of Warwick Castle

== Notes ==
Parliament of the United Kingdom
Preceded by George Villiers; Samuel Robert Gaussen	Member of Parliament for Warwick; 1802–1816; With: Charles Mills	Succeeded by Charles Mills; Sir Charles John Greville
Honorary titles
Preceded by The Marquess of Hertford	Lord-Lieutenant of Warwickshire; 1822–1853	Succeeded by The Earl of Craven
Peerage of Great Britain
Preceded by George Greville	Earl Brooke; Earl of Warwick; 1816–1853	Succeeded by George Greville
