= Thomas Winstanley =

British academic

Thomas Winstanley (1749 – 2 September 1823) was an academic at the University of Oxford, who held the positions of Camden Professor of Ancient History, Laudian Professor of Arabic, and principal of St Alban Hall.

== Life ==
Winstanley was born in the town of Winstanley, in what was then Lancashire, and was baptised on 11 November 1749. After an education at Manchester Grammar School, he matriculated at the University of Oxford as a member of Brasenose College in 1768, obtaining his Bachelor of Arts degree in 1771 and his Master of Arts degree in 1774. He was appointed to a fellowship at Hertford College and succeeded Thomas Warton as Camden Professor of Ancient History in 1790. He was elected principal of St Alban Hall in 1797, and appointed as Laudian Professor of Arabic in 1814 (holding this in addition to the Camden chair). He was rector of Steyning, Sussex, between 1790 and 1792; prebendary of St Paul's Cathedral from 1794 to 1810; and vicar of St Nicholas and St Clements, Rochester, Kent, from 1812. His writings included Aristotelous peri poiētikēs: Aristotelis de poetica liber (1780), and an edition of the works of Daniel Webb (1802).

Winstanley died on 2 September 1823. He is buried in St Peter's-in-the-East in Oxford with a monument by Robert Blore.
