= Earl of Mexborough =

Title in the peerage of Ireland

Earldom of Mexborough
- Arms of Savile: Argent, on a bend sable three owls guardant close of the field; Crest: An owl guardant close argent; Supporters: On either side a lion proper collared and chained or
- Creation date: 11 February 1766
- Created by: King George III
- Peerage: Peerage of Ireland
- First holder: John Savile, 1st Baron Pollington
- Present holder: James Savile, 9th Earl of Mexborough
- Heir apparent: Arthur Savile, Viscount Pollington
- Remainder to: The 1st Earls’ heirs male of the body lawfully begotten
- Subsidiary titles: Viscount Pollington; Baron Pollington
- Status: Extant
- Seat: Arden Hall
- Former seat: Methley Hall
- Motto: BE FAST

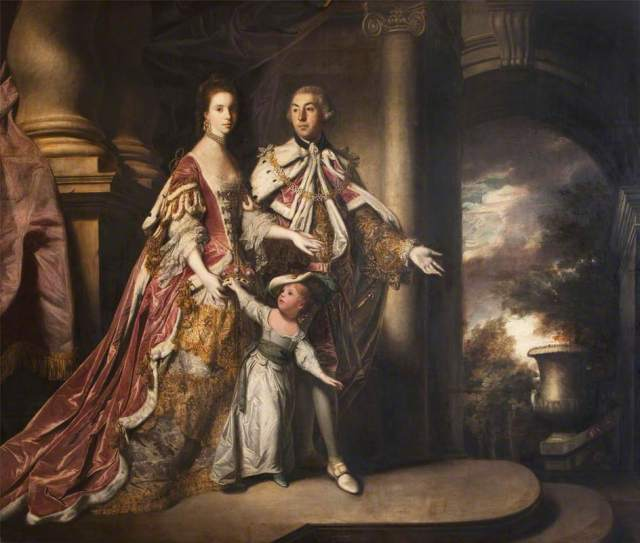
John Savile, 1st Earl of Mexborough, with his wife and son.

Earl of Mexborough, of Lifford in the County of Donegal, is a title in the Peerage of Ireland. It was created on 11 February 1766 for John Savile, 1st Baron Pollington, Member of Parliament for Hedon and New Shoreham. He had already been created Baron Pollington, of Longford in the County of Longford, on 8 November 1753, and was made Viscount Pollington, of Ferns in the County of Wexford, at the same time as he was given the earldom. These titles are also in the Peerage of Ireland. He was succeeded by his eldest son, the second Earl. He represented Lincoln in the House of Commons. His son, the third Earl, was Member of Parliament for Pontefract for many years. On his death the titles passed to his son, the fourth Earl. He represented Gatton and Pontefract in Parliament as a Conservative. His son, the fifth Earl, was High Sheriff of Yorkshire in 1877. He was succeeded by his half-brother, the sixth Earl. As of 2026 the titles are held by the latter's great-grandson, the ninth Earl, who succeeded his father in 2026.

Despite their territorial designations and the fact that they are in the Peerage of Ireland, all three titles refer to places in the United Kingdom, namely Mexborough and Pollington in Yorkshire.

The current seat of the Earls of Mexborough is Arden Hall, near Hawnby, in North Yorkshire. The estate was acquired by the family in 1897. Previously the family had lived at Methley Hall, which was demolished in 1958. John Horace Savile, 5th Earl of Mexborough, also built Castle Devachan in San Remo, the site of the 1920 San Remo conference. The former Bishop's House at Eltofts, Thorner, near Leeds, was the Dower House of the Earls of Mexborough.

== Earls of Mexborough (1766) ==
- John Savile, 1st Earl of Mexborough (1719–1778)
- John Savile, 2nd Earl of Mexborough (1761–1830)
- John Savile, 3rd Earl of Mexborough (1783–1860)
- John Charles George Savile, 4th Earl of Mexborough (1810–1899)
- John Horace Savile, 5th Earl of Mexborough (1843–1916)
- John Henry Savile, 6th Earl of Mexborough (1868–1945)
- John Raphael Wentworth Savile, 7th Earl of Mexborough (1906–1980)
- John Christopher George Savile, 8th Earl of Mexborough (1931–2026)
- James Hugh Hope John Savile, 9th Earl of Mexborough (born 1976)

== Ancestry ==
Ancestors of Earl of Mexborough

8. John Savile, 4th Earl of Mexborough
4. John Savile, 6th Earl of Mexborough
9. Agnes Raphael
2. John Savile, 7th Earl of Mexborough
10. Edward Knatchbull-Hugessen, 2nd Baron Brabourne
5. Hon. Margaret Knatchbull-Hugessen
11. Hon. Amy Beaumont
1. John Savile, 8th Earl of Mexborough
12. John Fletcher
6. Andrew Fletcher
13. Bertha Talbot
3. Josephine Fletcher
14. Sir Francis Winnington, 5th Baronet
7. Frances Winnington
15. Jane Spencer-Churchill
