= Thomas Rennell (scholar) =

English theologian and author

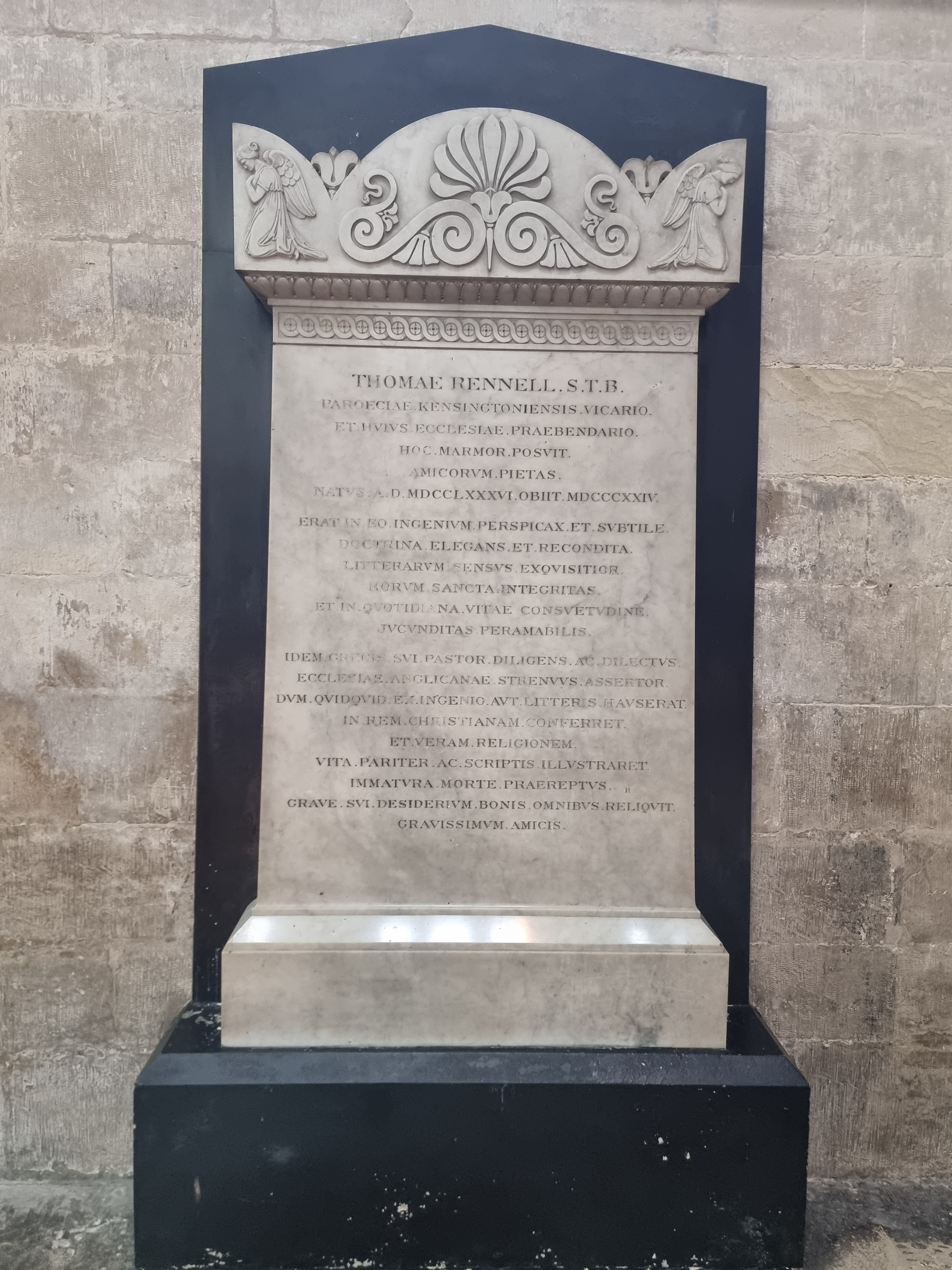
Memorial to Thomas Rennell in Salisbury Cathedral

Thomas Rennell (1787–1824) was an English theologian and author.

== Life ==
The only son of Thomas Rennell, Dean of Winchester, he was born at Winchester in 1787. Like his father, he was educated at Eton, where he had a brilliant reputation as a scholar. He won one of Dr. Claudius Buchanan's prizes for a Greek Sapphic ode on the propagation of the gospel in India, and a prize for Latin verses on 'Pallentes Morbi' (pale diseases, personified beings in the works of Virgil). He also conducted, in conjunction with three of his contemporaries, a periodical called the Miniature, a successor of the 'Microcosm'. In 1806 he was elected from Eton to King's College, Cambridge. There in 1806 he won Sir William Browne's medal for the best Greek ode on the subject 'Veris Comites'; in 1810 he published, in conjunction with Charles James Blomfield, afterwards Bishop of London, Musae Cantabrigienses, and he contributed to the Museum Criticum, a journal established in 1813 by Blomfield and Monk. He graduated B.A. in 1810, M.A. in 1813, and S.T.B. in 1822.

Having received Holy Orders, he was at once appointed assistant preacher at the Temple Church by his father, who was the Master. Father and son were regarded as equally effective and popular preachers there. He also delivered the Warburtonian lectures at Lincoln's Inn. His interests were wide, and he attended a regular course of anatomical lectures in London.

He was a friend of the members of a group of high-churchmen of whom Joshua Watson was the lay and Henry Handley Norris the clerical leader; and in 1811 he became editor of the British Critic which was the organ of his friends, and to which he was a frequent contributor. In 1816 he was appointed by the bishop of London, Dr. Howley, as vicar of Kensington, and proved himself an active and conscientious parish priest. In the same year he was elected Christian advocate at Cambridge. In that capacity he published in 1819 Remarks on Scepticism, especially as connected with the subject of Organisation and Life; being an Answer to the Views of M. Bichat, Sir T. C. Morgan, and Mr. Lawrence upon these points. His knowledge of anatomy and medicine enabled him to write on such a subject, and, despite criticism, the book passed through a sixth edition in 1824.

He was for several years examining chaplain to the Bishop of Salisbury, John Fisher who in 1823 gave him the mastership of St. Nicholas's Hospital and the prebend of South Grantham in Salisbury Cathedral. He was elected Fellow of the Royal Society, in spite of an attempt to exclude him in consequence of his Remarks on Scepticism.

In 1823 he married the eldest daughter of John Delafield of Kensington; but within a few weeks he was struck down with a fever, and died at Winchester on 30 June 1824. He was buried in Winchester Cathedral, and a funeral sermon was preached on him at Kensington by his successor, Archdeacon Joseph Holden Pott. His monument is by Robert Blore.

== Works ==
Samuel Parr, in his Letter to Dr. John Milner (1819), described him as standing 'by profound erudition, and by various and extensive knowledge ... among the brightest luminaries of our national literature or national church'. Besides his classical writings, sermons, and contributions to the British Critic and other periodicals, he published:

1. Animadversions on the Unitarian Translation or Improved Version of the New Testament. By a Student of Divinity, 1811.
2. Proofs of Inspiration on the grounds of distinction between the New Testament and the Apocryphal Volume ... occasioned by the recent publication of the Apocryphal New Testament by Hone, 1822.
3. A Letter to Henry Brougham, Esq., on his Durham Speech, and three Articles in the "Edinburgh Review", (anon. 1823), in which he defended the church and the clergy against a series of attacks upon their property and character.
4. A Narrative of the Conversion and Death of Count Struensee by Dr. Munter, first translated into English by Dr. Wendeborn in 1774, with original notes, 1824.
