= Robert Blore =

Firm of sculptors

Robert Blore and Son were a late 18th century/early 19th century firm of sculptors based at 125 Piccadilly in central London.

== Background ==
Robert Blore the elder appears to be born around 1760 and worked until 1820 (when he presumably died). Robert Blore the younger was either his son or nephew and died in 1838. The term "Blore and Son" is used from 1790 indicating the younger Robert is born around 1770. The elder went bankrupt in 1818 and either died or retired two years later.

In 1825 Blore was partly subject of the scandalous "Memoirs of Herself and Others" by Harriette Wilson of Mayfair published by Stockdale in London which rapidly ran to 30 editions and made Mrs Wilson at least £10,000. Blore, by then married, successfully sued the publisher for £300 in libel damages.

Robert Blore the younger went into partnership with George Wilcox from 1830.

== Family ==
In Chelsea in 1795 Blore the younger married Emma Earley. They were parents to Henry Blore (1803–1860).

== Most notable works ==
- Monument to Edward Foley (1805) in Stoke Edith
- Monument to Sir William Myers, 1st Baronet (1805), Barbados Cathedral
- Monument to John Wasdale (1807), St.Paul's Cathedral
- Monument to Bishop James Yorke (1808) in Forthampton
- Monument to Elizabeth, Countess of Mexborough (1821) in Methley
  - Monument to Elizabeth, Countess of Mexborough (1821) in Westminster Abbey
- Monument to Edward Wrench (1821), Chester Cathedral
- Monument to Thomas Winstanley (1823) St Peter's-in-the-East, Oxford
- Monument to Thomas Rennell (1824) in Winchester Cathedral
- Monument to the Hon Henry Savile of Mexborough (1828) in Methley
- Monument to Sir Montague Cholmeley, 1st Baronet (1833) in Stoke Rochford, Lincolnshire
