= Cornelius de Pauw =

Dutch philosopher

Corneli(u)s Franciscus de Pauw (Dutch: [kɔrˈneːlijʏz də ˈpʌu, -lɪz -]; French: Corneille de Pauw; 18 August 1739 – 5 July 1799) was a Dutch philosopher, geographer and diplomat at the court of Frederick the Great of Prussia.

== Biography ==
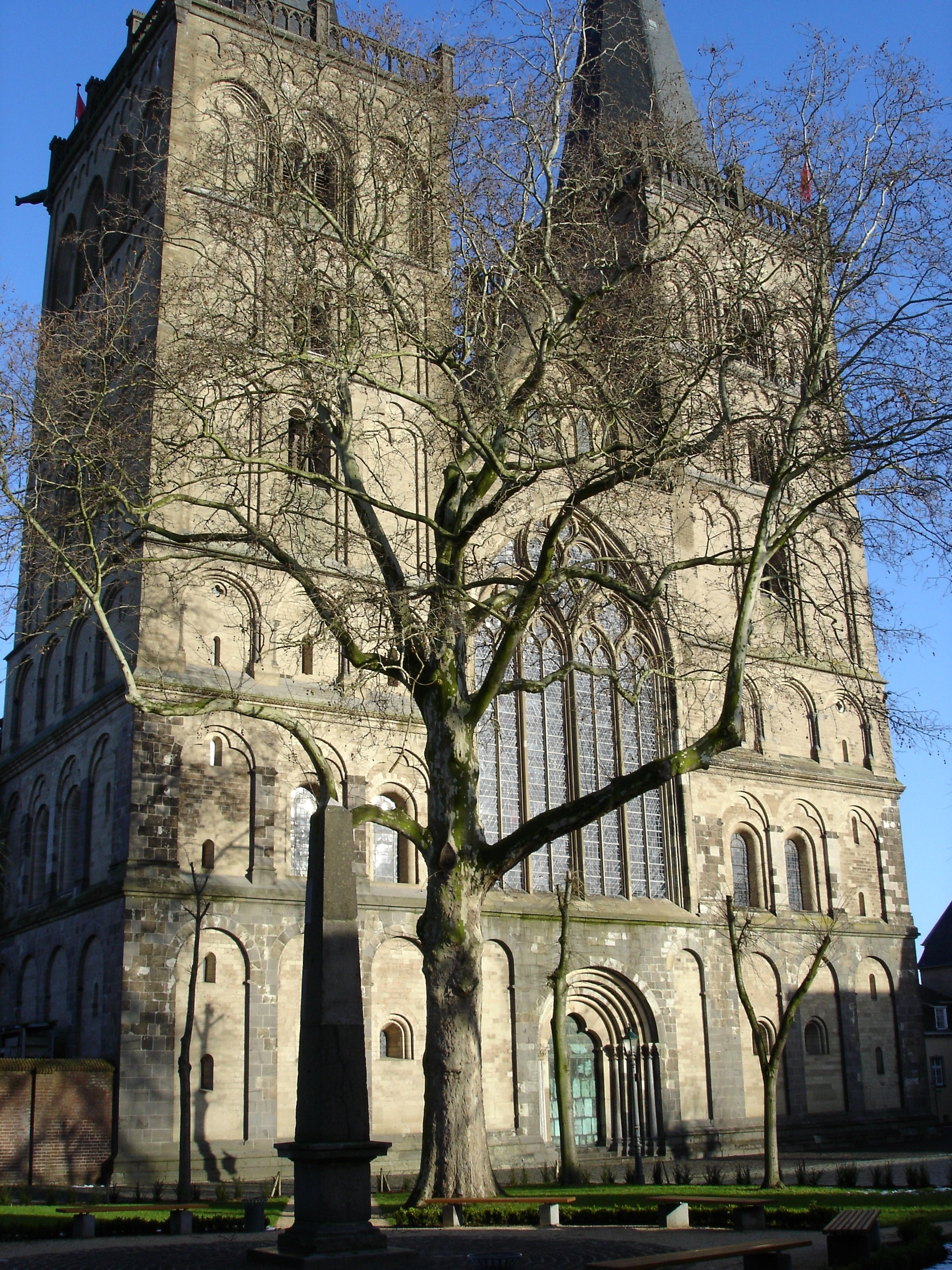
Obelisk de Pauw in Xanten

Although born in Amsterdam, son of Antonius Pauw and Quirina van Heijningen, he spent most of his life in Kleve. Working for the clergy, he nonetheless became familiar with the ideas of the Enlightenment. During his lifetime he was considered to be the greatest expert on the Americas, although he never visited the continent; he also wrote at length on the origins of ancient peoples, rejecting the popular idea of the time that China was originally a colony of Ancient Egypt.

He was a specialist in ethnologic studies as well, publishing a study of American Indians in French in 1768. Daniel Webb, an English scholar and translator, translated portions of de Pauw's work into English for a public that was hungry for information regarding the new continent of America. De Pauw had no hesitation in rejecting the observations of those with personal experience of the Americas if they differed from his preconceptions, as can be seen from his comments on the Aztec calendar. Despite this, he was reputed in his lifetime to be Europe's foremost authority on the Americas. He read the accounts of Buffon and other scientists, naturalists, and explorers, and drew his own conclusions. De Pauw was of the opinion (shared with other European scientists of that time) that the American natives were inferior to natives of northern and western Europe, and that this inferiority was partly due to American climate and geography.

Some quotes from his works:

The American [native], strictly speaking, is neither virtuous nor vicious. What motive has he to be either? The timidity of his soul, the weakness of his intellects, the necessity of providing for his subsistence, the powers of superstition, the influences of climate, all lead him far wide of the possibility of improvement; but he perceives it not; his happiness is, not to think; to remain in perfect inaction; to sleep a great deal; to wish for nothing, when his hunger is appeased; and to be concerned about nothing but the means of procuring food when hunger torments him. He would not build a cabin, did not cold and the inclemency of the atmosphere force him to it, nor ever quit that cabin, did not necessity thrust him out. In his understanding there is no gradation, he continues an infant to the last hour of his life. By his nature sluggish in the extreme, he is revengeful through weakness, and atrocious in his vengeance...

The Europeans who pass into America degenerate, as do the animals; a proof that the climate is unfavourable to the improvement of either man or animal. The Creoles, descending from Europeans and born in America, though educated in the universities of Mexico, of Lima, and College de Santa Fe, have never produced a single book. This degradation of humanity must be imputed to the vitiated qualities of the air stagnated in their immense forests, and corrupted by noxious vapours from standing waters and uncultivated grounds…

Rejecting the existence of the Aztec calendar:

It cannot be, because such a practice presupposes a long series of astronomical observations and very precise knowledge for calculating the solar year, which cannot coincide with the prodigious ignorance in which those peoples were submerged. How could those (peoples) have perfected their chronology who did not have words to count above ten?

Elsewhere:

There are none of these languages in which is possible to count above three. It is not possible to translate a book, not just into the languages of the Algonquins or of the Guaranis or Paraguayans, but even into the languages of Mexico or Peru, because they lack a sufficient number of terms capable of enunciating general concepts.

De Pauw extended his theory to the livestock and wild animals of the Americas:

The degeneracy which prevails in the stranger animals, among whom I shall reckon man, differs in different provinces. Dogs, which in Peru are subject to the venereal disease, are not so in the northern regions; hogs, which dwindle in Pennsylvania, in other places lose their shape, but not their stature; in the English colonies, European sheep become smaller, without losing their wool; in the islands, as in Jamaica, they change their wool for a hair hard and coarse, which cannot be manufactured...

Pauw's work also dealt with the manners and customs unique to the natives of the Americas, ranging from the Inuit and Canadian Indians in the north to the Peruvians in the south. De Pauw speculates on differences and similarities between the North Americans and natives in Siberia. He notes:

The Tunguses, a people of Siberia, are, like the Canadians, grave, phlegmatic, and speak little; because they have but few ideas, and still fewer words to express them; add to this, that the silence and gloom of their forests naturally induce an habitual melancholy. Hence it is that they prefer strong and inebriating liquors, which quicken the motion of the blood, and set the machine in action, to the most precious gifts that can be made them.

The Tunguses hang their dead on trees, so do the Illinois of America; they cannot dig graves in the earth frozen hard to the depth of twenty feet. This is obviously nothing more than a coincidence...

In a discussion about the physical characteristics of Native Americans, he writes of a peculiar custom among the Caribbeans:

There is in the Caribane a sort of savages who have hardly any neck, and whose shoulders rise as high as the ears; this too is factitious, and brought about by laying great weights on the head of the infant, which compress the vertebrae of the neck, and force them to descend into the hollow formed by the two bones of the upper part of the breast. These monsters appear, at a certain distance, to have the mouth in the middle of the breast; and may well renew, to travelers ignorant and delighting in wonders, the ancient fable of the Acephales, or of men without heads.

De Pauw writes of the appearance of the "Eskimo":

They are the most diminutive race of human kind, their stature in general not exceeding four feet. They have enormous heads, are extremely fat and corpulent, and much under-limbed. On examining the extremities of their limbs, one perceives that organization has been checked by the severity of that cold, which contracts and degrades all earthly productions. Man, however, resists this impression in higher degrees towards the Pole than trees or plants, since beyond the 68th degree neither tree nor shrub is to be found, while savages are met with 300 leagues beyond that elevation.

His work stirred tremendous controversy in its time and provoked responses from the leading American citizens. An "Anti-Degeneracy" campaign against the assertions of de Pauw and his colleagues involved such notables such Thomas Jefferson and James Madison.

As a renowned scholar, he corresponded with the major philosophes of his time - including Voltaire -, and was asked to contribute articles to the Encyclopédie. He was the uncle of Anacharsis Cloots, to whom he was also a teacher.

De Pauw died in Xanten. Napoleon I of France had an obelisk raised in his memory in Xanten.

== Criticism ==
De Pauw and his ideas were objects of severe criticism by some of his contemporaries, notably those with experience of the Americas. The Mexican Jesuit Francisco Javier Clavijero, exiled in Bologna, attached a series of "Dissertations" to his Storia antica del Messico with de Pauw "the principal target of my shots." In his history of the rise and fall of the Aztec empire, Clavijero ("Francesco Saverio Clavigero") of course dealt with the Mesoamerican calendar system, and in the "Dissertations" he quoted de Pauw's remarks shown above, pointing to the many scholars, European and Indian, who had described the calendar previously. He also showed how to count up to forty-eight million in Nahuatl, listed a number of Nahuatl words for metaphysical and moral concepts, pointed out that the Gospels and Thomas a Kempis's The Imitation of Christ had been translated into Nahuatl, acknowledged his debt to Indian writers such as Ixtlilxochitl, and catalogued authors both European and American born who had written in American languages ranging from Tarahumara to Cakchiquel.

Another Jesuit exile in Italy, the Chilean Juan Ignacio Molina, accused de Pauw of "always attempting to degrade and discredit the Americas". Some of de Pauw's statements on the poor aspects of the mineral wealth of the Americas were countered by Molina along with his claims about the shorter lives of their inhabitants.

== Works ==
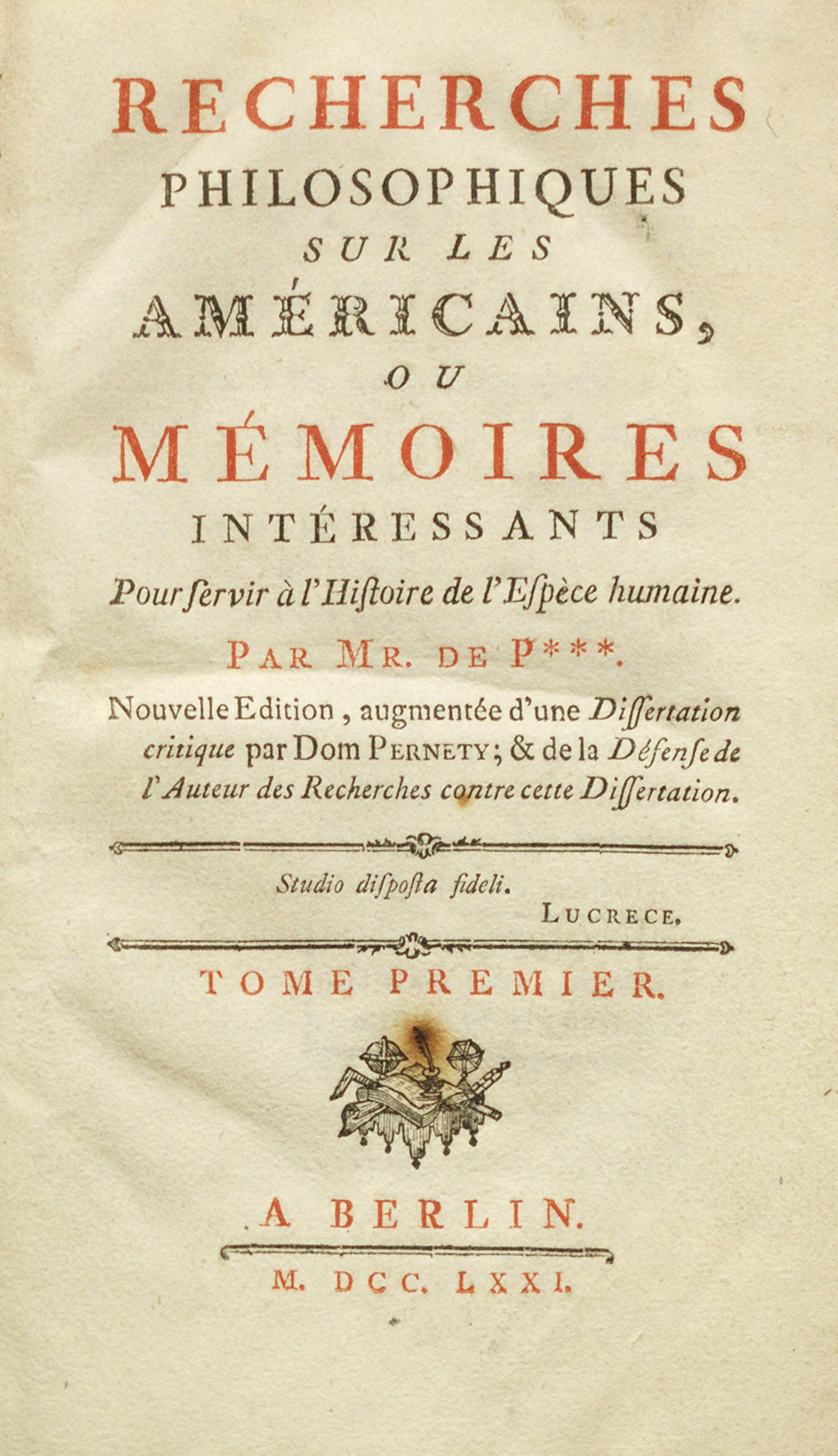
Title page of Cornelius de Pauw (1771): Recherches philosophiques sur les Américains.

- Recherches philosophiques sur les Américains, ou Mémoires intéressants pour servir à l’Histoire de l’Espèce Humaine. Avec une Dissertation sur l’Amérique & les Américains, London, 1771
- Recherches philosophiques sur les Égyptiens et les Chinois, London, Lausanne and Geneva, 1774
- Recherches philosophiques sur les Grecs, Paris, 1788, Berlin, 1787-1788
- Selections from M. Pauw, with Additions by Daniel Webb, Bath and London 1795

== See also ==
- Blafard
