= John Westbrooke Chandler =

British painter and poet

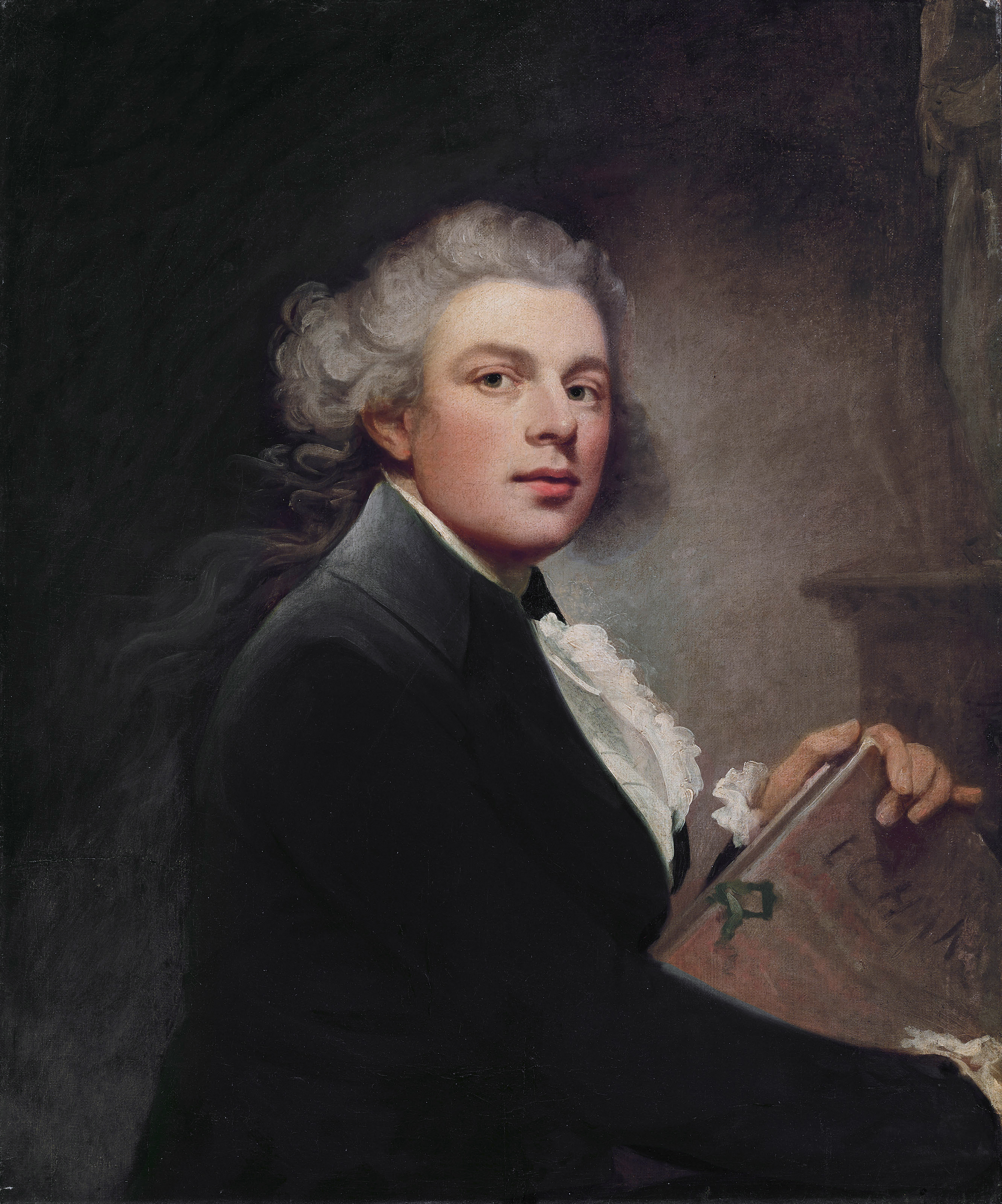
John Westbrooke Chandler

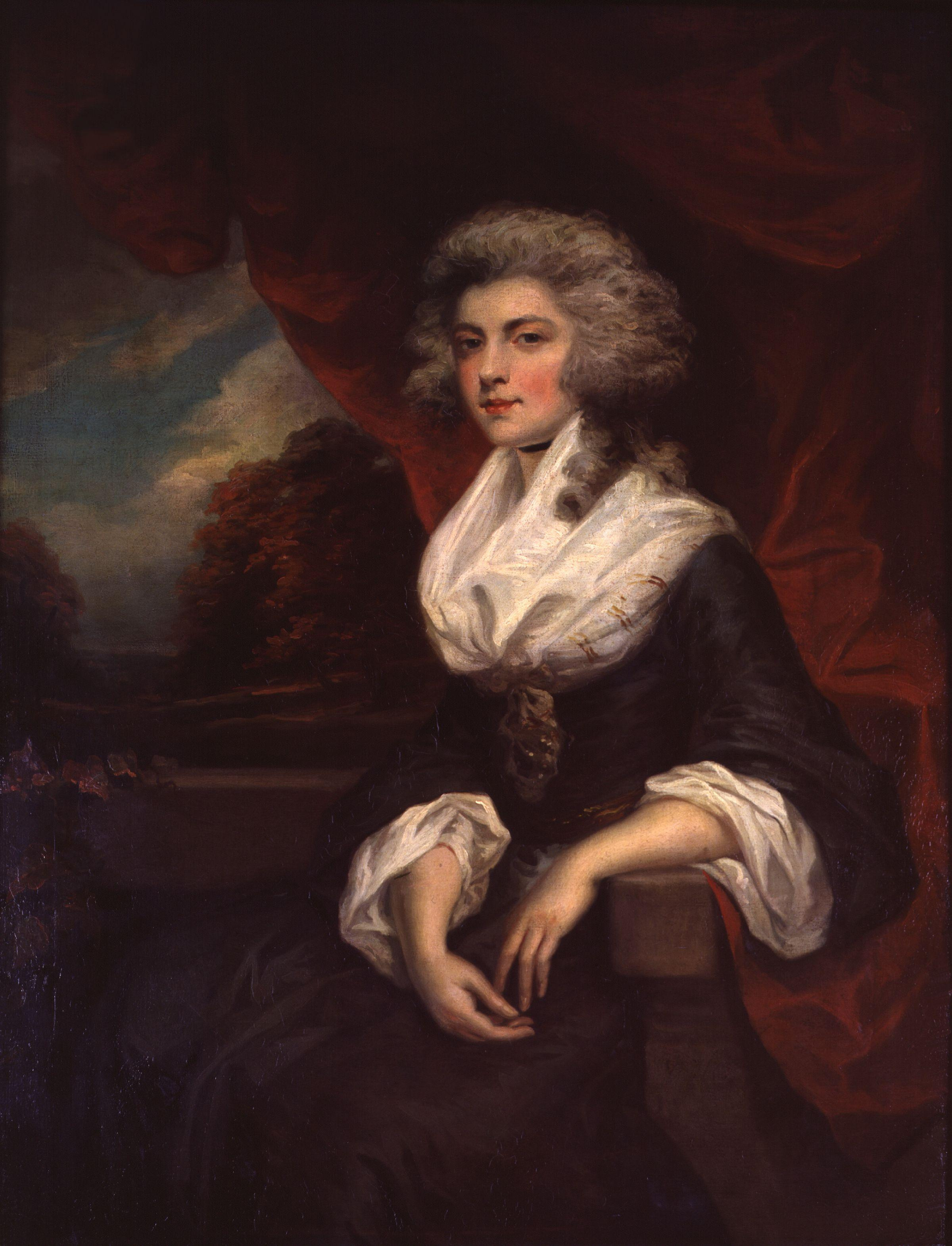
Elizabeth (Hervey), Duchess of Devonshire

John Westbrooke Chandler (1763/4 – 1807) was a British painter and poet.

== Biography ==
Chandler was the natural son of the Earl of Warwick, presumed to be George Greville, 2nd Earl of Warwick.

He entered the Royal Academy Schools in 1784 at the age of twenty one, and went on to exhibit portraits and fancy pictures at the Royal Academy between the years 1787 to 1791. As a portrait painter, his surviving works exhibit the influence of many of the leading painters of the late eighteenth century, including Joshua Reynolds, George Romney, John Hoppner and Thomas Lawrence. Chandler was also recorded to have painted landscapes towards the end of his life, yet, none seem to have survived.

Chandler particularly benefitted from the patronage of the Earl of Warwick, who is likely to have given him the use of studios at Warwick Castle for painting.

About 1800, he was invited to Aberdeenshire, where he painted a good many portraits. Afterwards he settled in Edinburgh. He indulged freethinking speculations, was melancholic, and is rumoured to have attempted to kill himself. Although previous biographies have suggested that Chandler died in confinement between 1804-5, the reappearance of his obituary written in the Staffordshire Advertiser dated 25 April 1807 has dispelled this myth. Chandler spent the last years of his life living in Stroud, Gloucestershire, where he is said to have painted his final pictures for local patrons.

The artist also came to befriend the radical thinker and philosopher William Godwin. Records show that Chandler had lent money to Godwin, alongside painting his portrait which is now held in the collection of Tate Britain.

In 1800 he wrote a neo-gothic ballad 'Sir Hubert' which was dedicated to Earl of Warwick, his natural father or half-brother. It is possible that this neo medieval tale, which climaxes in a joust, was inspired by Warwick Castle.
