= Blafard =

18th-century imaginary American creature

A blafard is an imaginary creature purportedly found in the early United States. Blafards, also called "kackerlackes", were "strange albinos long surmised to be the result of some kind of simian crossbreeding", but of an "accidental variety". Blafards were imagined by Europeans, notably Cornelius De Pauw in the 18th century. This creature was a symbol of the degeneration of America in the minds of Europeans, along with the "hermaphrodite", which "epitomized Americans' sexual disorder.

Blafards were imagined to be "caused by a deficiency 'in their parents' spermatic liquor'" and were "absolutely deprived of the power of generation, or did not engender children that resemble them".

Blafards were a manifestation of the early Anti-Americanism that originated in Europe in the 18th century. Their earliest mention is in the works of Georges-Louis Leclerc, Comte de Buffon and Cornelius De Pauw.
