= Daniel Webb (writer) =

Irish writer on aesthetics

Daniel Webb (1718/19 – 2 August 1798) was an Irish writer on aesthetics whose works enjoyed a considerable vogue for a time.

== Life ==
Webb was born at Maidstown, County Limerick, in 1718 or 1719, the eldest son of Daniel Webb of Maidstown Castle, and his wife Dorothea, daughter and heiress of M. Leake of Castle Leake, County Tipperary. He matriculated from New College, Oxford, on 13 June 1735.

Following his studies he went to Rome, where he became friendly with the Neoclassical painter Anton Raphael Mengs who painted his portrait. On his return to Britain he published his Inquiry into the Beauties of Painting (1760). Winkelmann later accused him of having plagiarised the work from the unpublished manuscript of Mengs' treatise Gedanken über die Schönheit.

In later life he lived mainly at Bath. He was married twice, first, to Jane Lloyd and, later to Elizabeth Creed. He died, leaving no children, on 2 August 1798.

== Works ==
- An Inquiry into the Beauties of Painting (London 1760; 4th edition 1777; three German translations appeared in 1771, and an Italian one was published in Venice in 1791).
- Remarks on the Beauties of Poetry, (London 1762; new edition Dublin 1764).
- Observations on the Correspondence between Poetry and Music (London 1769; German translation Leipzig 1771).
- Literary Amusements in Verse and Prose (London 1787).
- Some Reasons for thinking the Greek Language was borrowed from the Chinese: In Notes on the "Grammatica Sinica" of Mons. Fourmont (London 1787). Webb's theory of the derivation of the Greek language was not one that Fourmont, a French scholar who died in 1745, had considered.

These five works were republished in one volume in 1802 by Thomas Winstanley under the title of Miscellanies. In 1789 Webb produced his Selections from "Les Recherches Philosophiques sur les Américains" of Mr. Pauw. Initially only fifty copies were printed, for private circulation. Another edition was published for a wider readership in 1795, as Selections from M. Pauw, with Additions by Daniel Webb, Esq..The extracts were randomly ordered, with the additional comments printed in italics to differentiate them from Pauw's text. A contemporary reviewer wrote that "[Webb] often pauses to reflect on the facts which his author furnishes and his reflections, though sometimes a little out of the beaten track, are always ingenious, and most commonly judicious."
