= Thomas Rennell =

English churchman

The Very Reverend Thomas Rennell FRS
- Dean of Winchester Cathedral
- Installed: 1805

Personal details
- Born: 8 February 1754 Barnack, Northamptonshire, England
- Died: 31 March 1840 (aged 86) The Deanery, Winchester, Hampshire, England
- Spouse: Sarah Blackstone (m. 1786)
- Children: Thomas Rennell
- Education: Eton College
- Alma mater: King's College, Cambridge (BA, MA (per lit. reg.), DD)

Thomas Rennell FRS (8 February 1754–31 March 1840) was an English churchman, dean of Winchester Cathedral and Master of the Temple.

== Life ==
He was born on 8 February 1754 at Barnack in Northamptonshire, where his father, Thomas Rennell (1720–1798), a prebendary of Winchester, was rector. In 1766 Thomas was sent to Eton, and thence proceeded to King's College, Cambridge, where, in due time, he became a fellow. He was a diligent student, and though, as a King's man, he could not compete for mathematical honours, he obtained in 1778 one of the member's prizes for bachelors for the best Latin essay on 'Government.' He graduated Bachelor of Arts (BA) in 1777, Master of Arts (MA) per lit. reg. in 1779, and Doctor of Divinity (DD) in 1794.

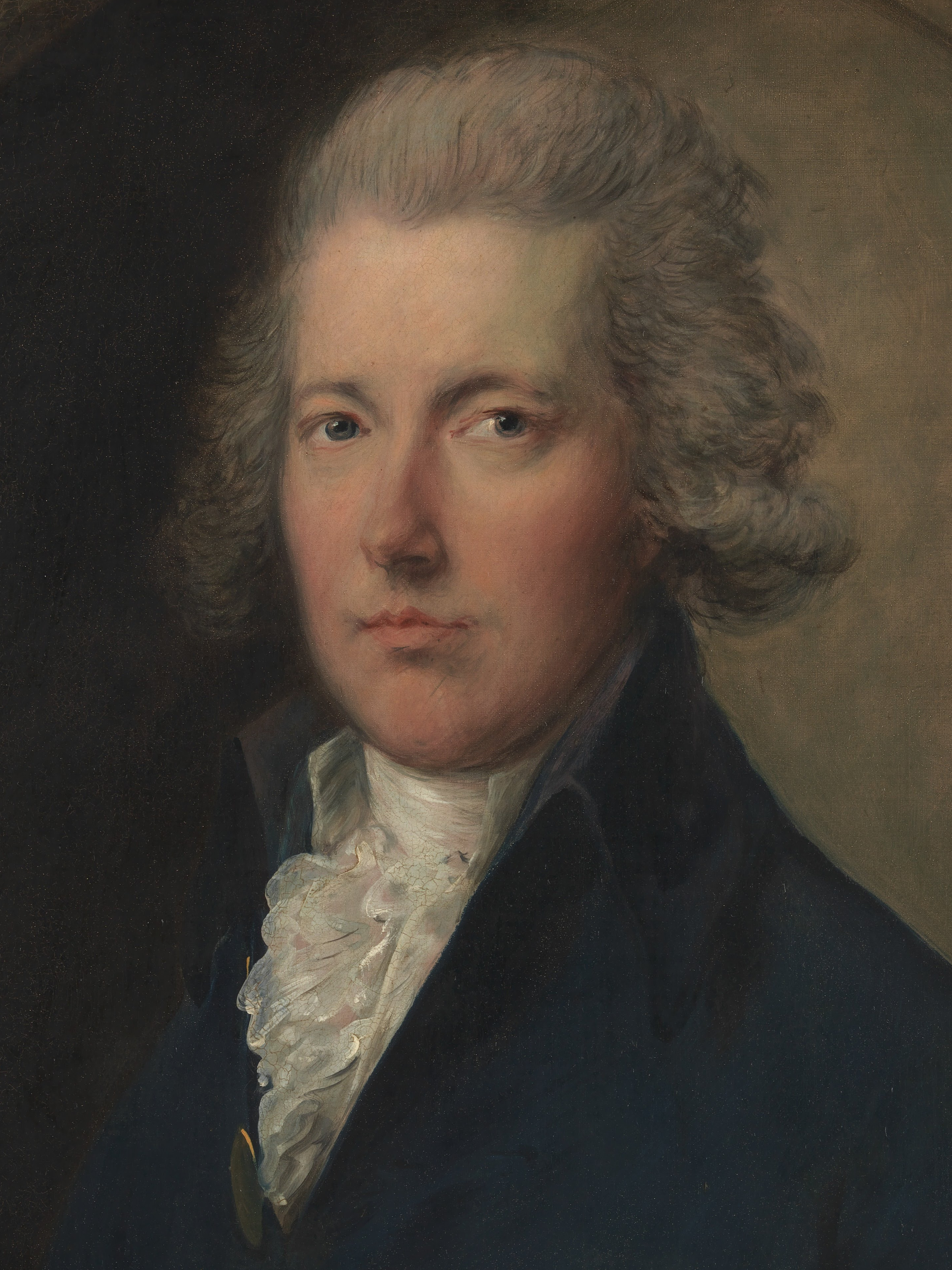
Pitt the Younger (pictured) was impressed with Rennell.

At Cambridge, he made the acquaintance of Thomas James Mathias and contributed to the notes of his Pursuits of Literature (1794-7). Mathias mentions him in the poem, in conjunction with Bishops Horsley and Douglas. Rennell left Cambridge on taking holy orders and became curate to his father at Barnack. His ample leisure he devoted to theology. His father soon resigned his prebendal stall at Winchester in his favor. In 1787 he undertook the charge of the populous parish of Alton. Subsequently, perhaps through the influence of the Marquis of Buckingham, he was presented to the rectory of St. Magnus, London Bridge. When he proceeded with D.D. at Cambridge in 1794, he preached a commencement sermon on the French Revolution which impressed Pitt, who called him 'the Demosthenes of the pulpit.' In 1797 Pitt urged him to accept the mastership of the Temple. He resigned from his prebendal stall the next year and devoted himself to his new office. He made friends with the great lawyers of the day, such as Eldon, Stowell, Kenyon, and Erskine, and cultivated the society of the junior members of the bar and the law students. Again, via Pitt's influence, he was appointed in 1805 dean of Winchester, and extensive repairs took place in the cathedral's fabric under his direction.

== Death and legacy ==
In consequence of growing infirmities, heightened probably by the premature death of his only son, he resigned the mastership of the Temple in 1827, when he wrote a touching letter of farewell to the Inns of the Inner and Middle Temple. He died at the deanery, Winchester, on 31 March 1840, in his eighty-seventh year. In 1786 he married at Winchester Sarah, eldest daughter of Sir William Blackstone, the judge, by whom he had an only son, Thomas (1787–1824)

Rennell's reputation stood high as a scholar and theologian. He was long an intimate friend of Henry Handley Norris and the rest of the high-churchmen who formed what was called the Hackney phalanx or "Clapton sect". Dr Samuel Parr described him as 'most illustrious'.

== Works ==
He printed nothing except a volume of sermons Discourses on various Subjects (1801), most of which had been previously printed separately. They are scholarly productions, and the writer shows erudition in the notes.
