= John Savile, 1st Earl of Mexborough =

British peer

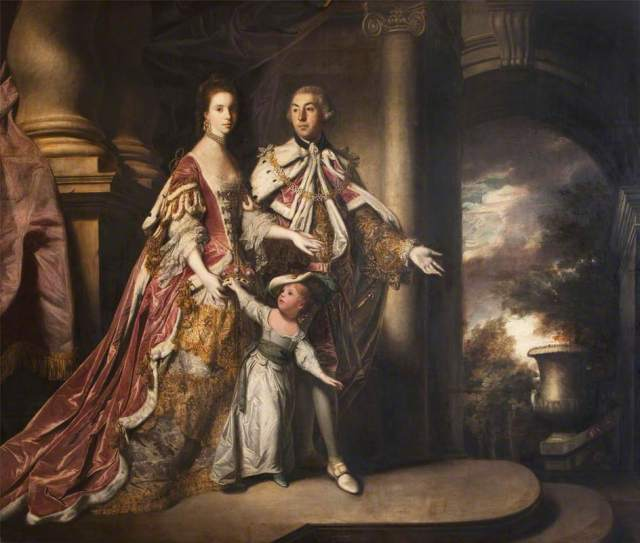
The 1st Earl of Mexborough, with his wife and son

Arms of Savile: Argent, on a bend sable three owls of the field

John Savile, 1st Earl of Mexborough (December 1719 – 12 February 1778), known as The Lord Pollington between 1753 and 1766, was a British peer and Member of Parliament.

Savile was the eldest son of Charles Savile of Methley (1676–1741) and Alathea Millington. He entered Parliament in 1747 as member for Hedon in East Yorkshire, and subsequently also represented New Shoreham. In 1749 he was appointed a Knight Companion of the Order of the Bath. In November 1753 he was raised to the Peerage of Ireland as Baron Pollington of Longford in the County of Longford whilst remaining an MP. In February 1766 he was created Viscount Pollington of Ferns in the County of Wexford and Earl of Mexborough of Lifford in the County of Donegal, again in the Irish peerage.

Mexborough was a friend and patron of the playwright and actor-manager Samuel Foote; it was while on a visit to Mexborough in 1766 that Foote lost a leg in a riding accident.

He married Sarah Delaval (1742-1821), daughter of Francis Blake Delaval, on 20 January 1760, and they had three sons:

- John Savile, 2nd Earl of Mexborough (1761–1830).
- Hon. Henry Savile (1763–1828).
- Hon. Charles Savile (1774–1807).

Parliament of Great Britain
Preceded by George Anson; Luke Robinson	Member of Parliament for Hedon; 1747–1754; With: Luke Robinson	Succeeded by Sir Charles Saunders; Peter Denis
Preceded by Sir William Peere Williams, Bt; The Viscount Midleton	Member of Parliament for New Shoreham; 1761–1768; With: The Viscount Midleton 1761–65; Samuel Cornish 1765–68	Succeeded by Peregrine Cust; Samuel Cornish
Peerage of Ireland
New creation	Earl of Mexborough; 1766–1778	Succeeded by John Savile
New creation	Baron Pollington; 1753–1778	Succeeded by John Savile
