= George Greville, 2nd Earl of Warwick =

British politician (1746–1816)

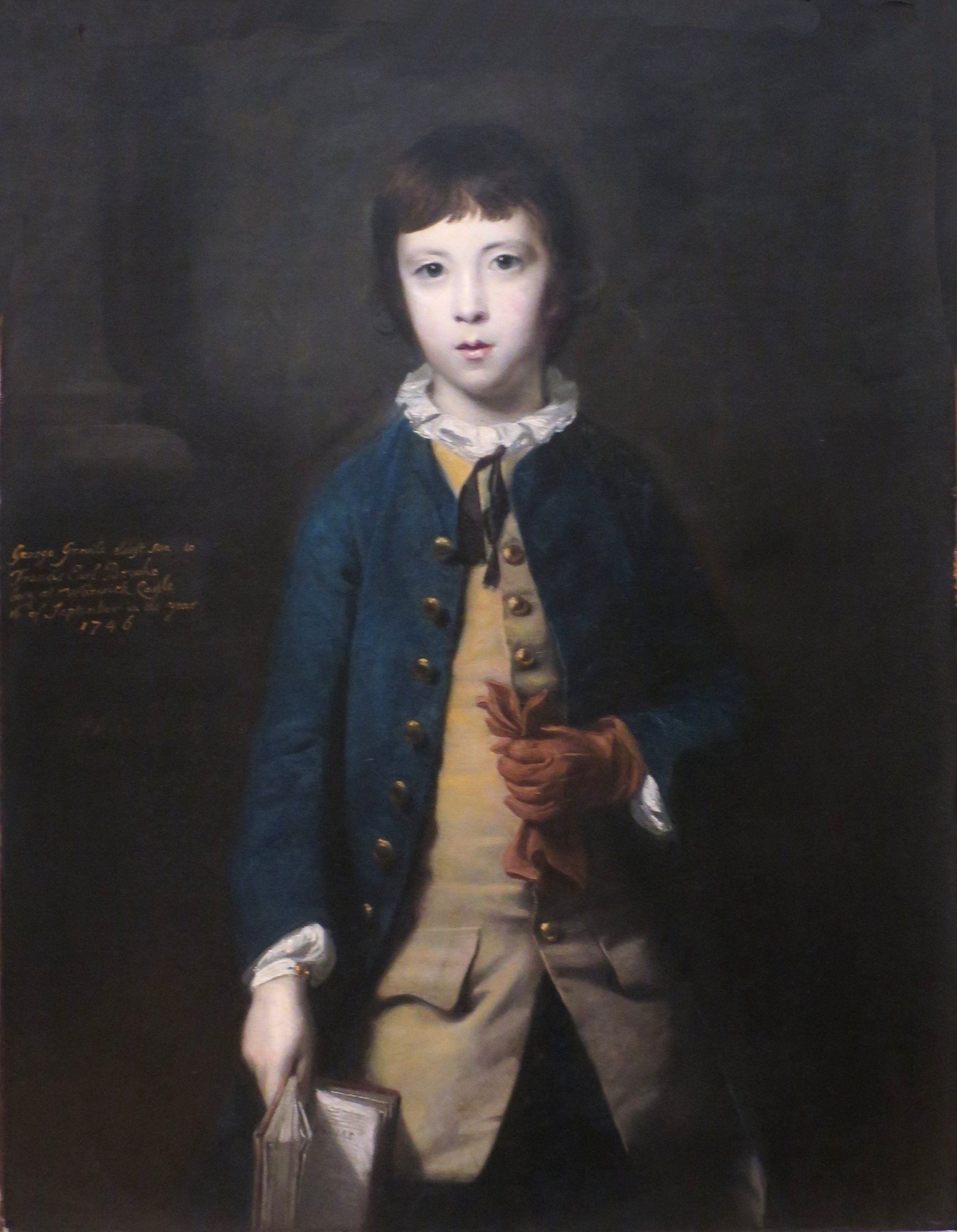
1754 portrait of Greville by Sir Joshua Reynolds

George Greville, 2nd Earl of Warwick, FRS, FSA (16 September 1746 – 1816), styled Lord Greville until 1773, was a British politician. The eldest son of Francis Greville, 1st Earl Brooke (created Earl of Warwick in 1759), he was born on 16 September 1746 at Warwick Castle. He was baptised on 10 October 1746 at St. Mary's, Warwick, with King George II standing as his sponsor.

== Education ==
Lord Greville was educated from 1753 to 1754 at Eton College, and later matriculated at Christ Church, University of Oxford, on 24 September 1764. He also matriculated at the University of Edinburgh and lodged with the famous historian William Robertson. Another recorded tutor was William Patoun, an amateur artist as well as librarian of Glasgow University who produced a portrait of the future Earl that survives at Warwick Castle. The Royal Register records that,

a very great and singular attention was paid to the education of this nobleman by his late father, who, fearful of the corruption which disgrace our great seminaries of learning, consigned him to the care of the first historian of the age, to complete his moral as well as political character. From Scotland he returned so well informed, and such an amiable manliness about him, that the most flattering prognostications were made of his future eminence... His travels did not in any great degree either improve or corrupt him, and he has since remained a quiet inoffensive domestic character, little known but by persons of taste and virtue.

== Early career ==
He was invested as a Fellow of the Royal Society on 17 December 1767 and as a Fellow of the Society of Antiquaries on 14 February 1768. and he was Member of Parliament for Warwick between 1768 and 1773. In 1770, Greville was appointed to the Board of Trade. Warwick's father possibly lent money against and then took a mortgage over a slave plantation in Tobago in c. 1771, which in turn allegedly led to his son owning slaves as well. However, University College London's Centre for the Study of the Legacies of British Slavery notes that the exact truth of this claim is unclear.

== Marriages and children ==
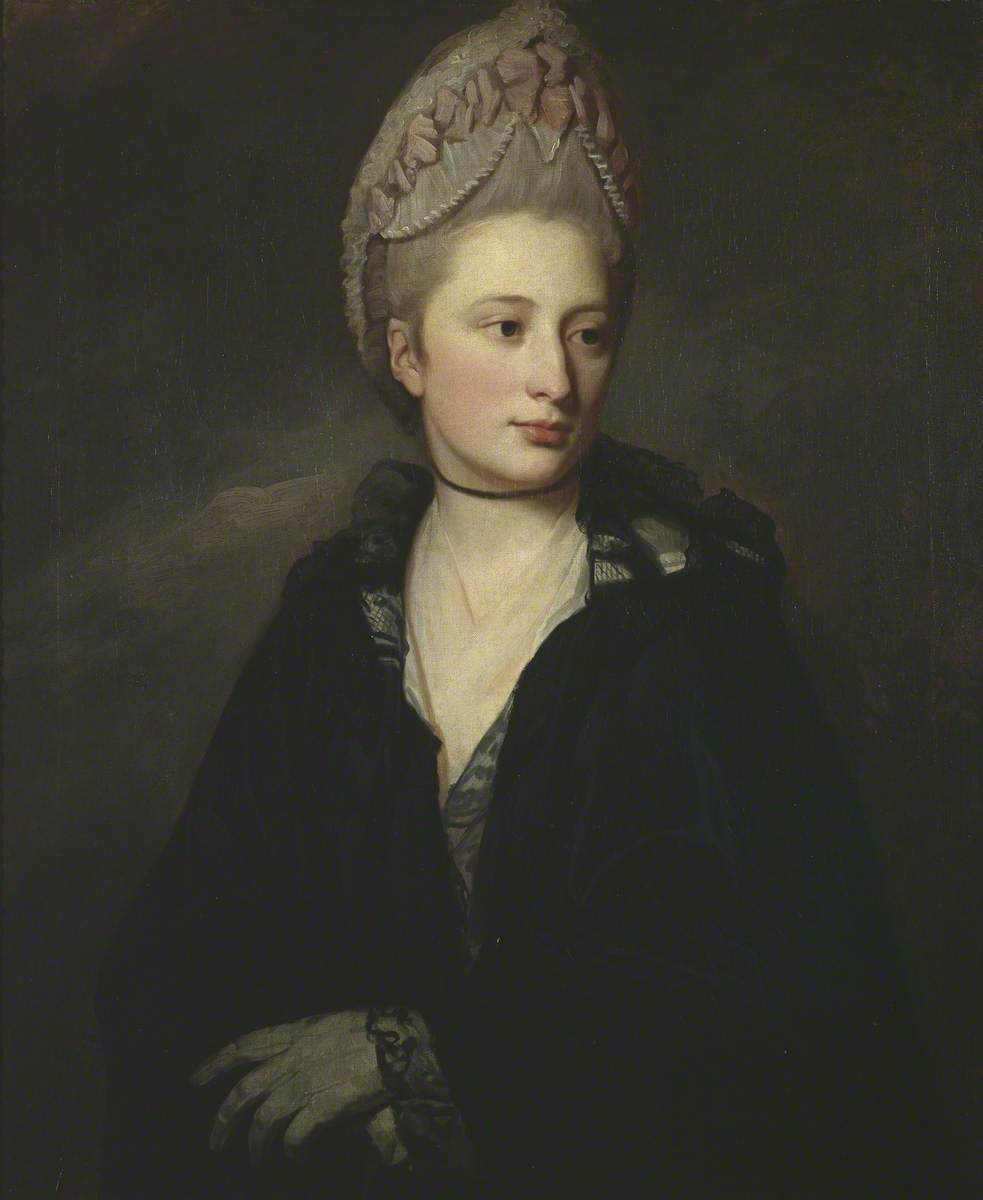
Georgiana Peachey, Lady Greville by George Romney 1771-1772

On 1 April 1771, he married Georgiana Peachey, the daughter of James Peachey, 1st Baron Selsey, at St George's, Hanover Square. she died just a year later. The couple had one son:

- George Greville, Lord Brooke (25 March 1772 – 2 May 1786)
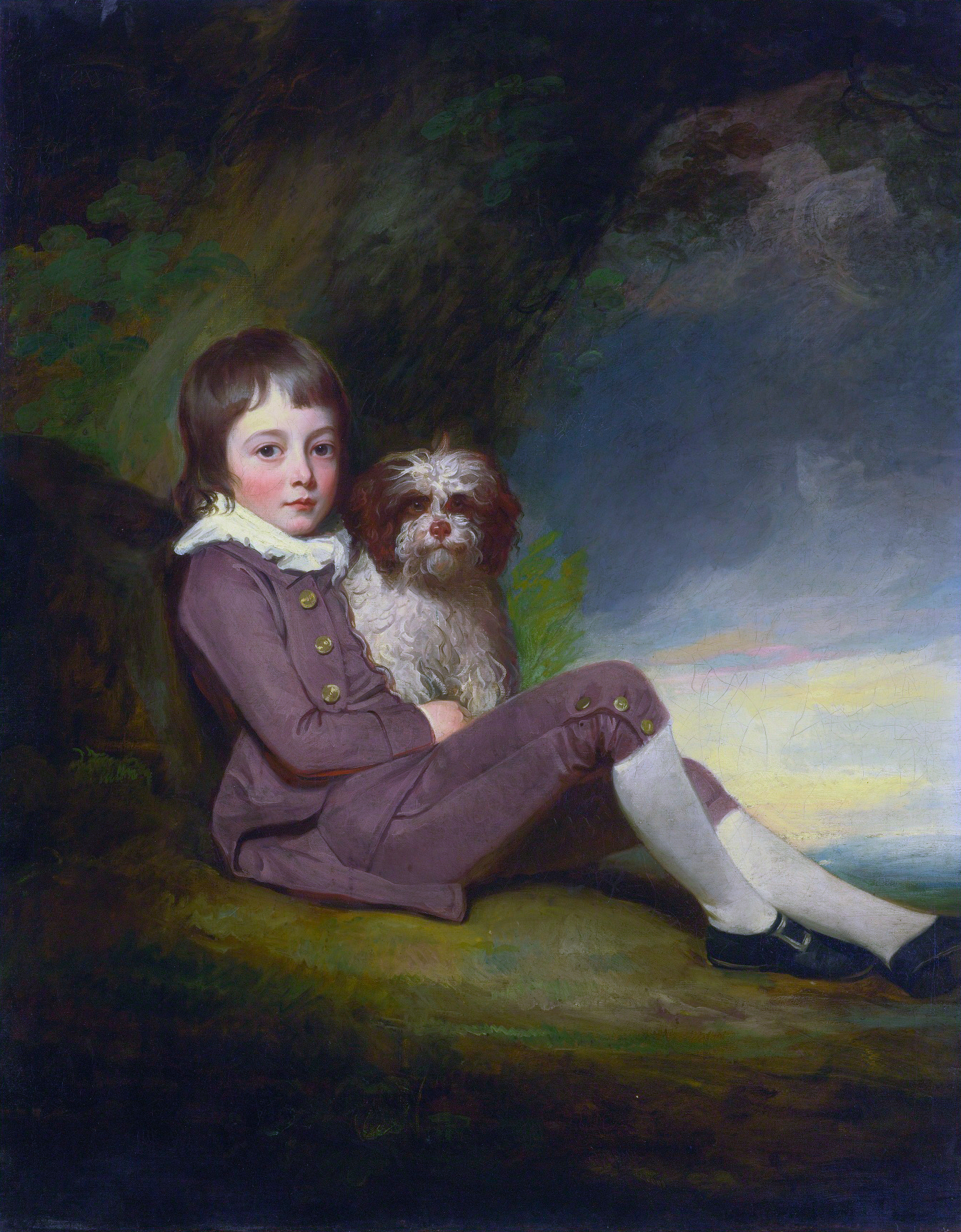
  George, Lord Brooke (1772–1786) (George Romney)

Lady Greville died in childbirth at the age of 19.

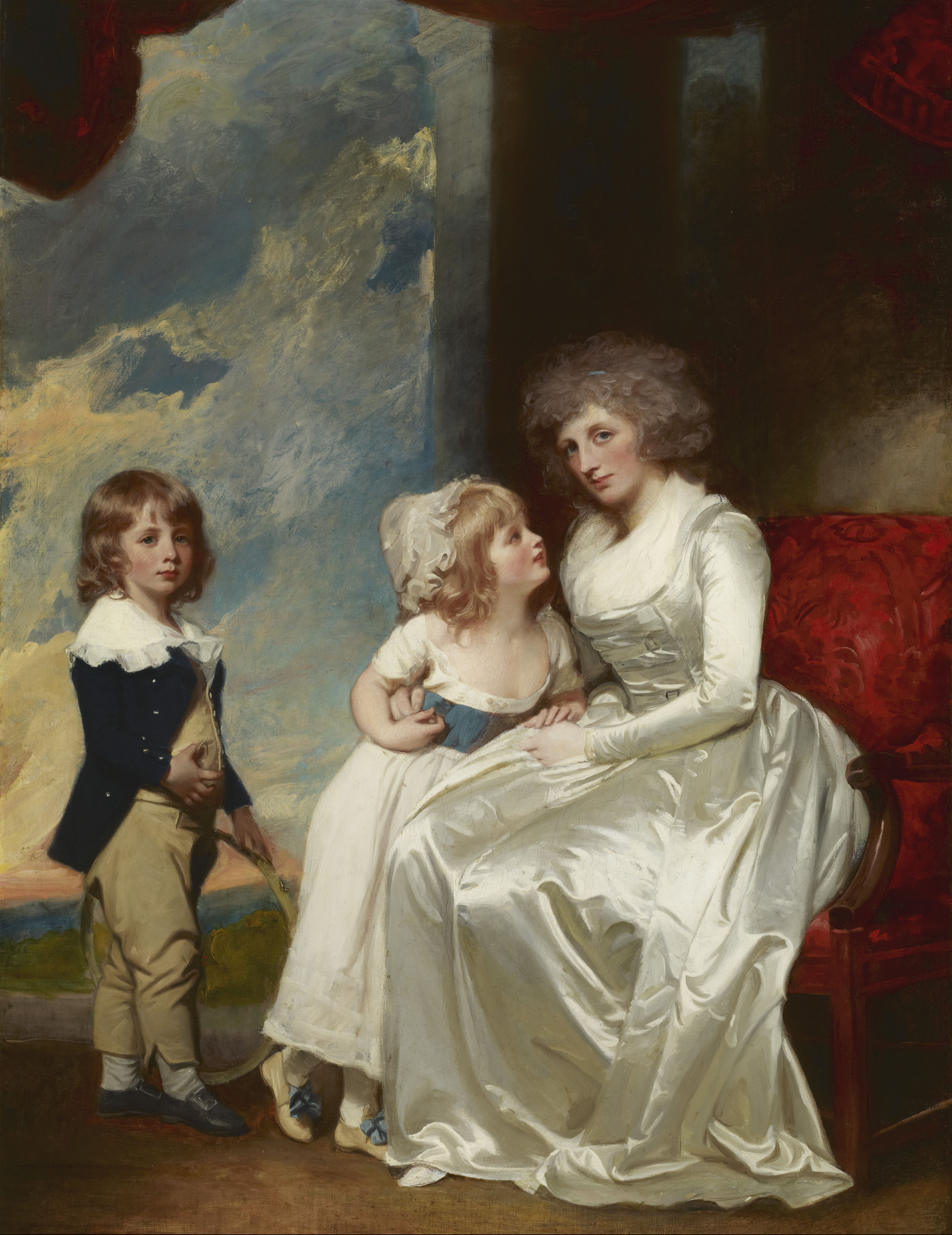
Henrietta, Countess of Warwick, and Her Children by Romney 1787-89

On 14 July 1776, Greville married Henrietta Vernon, the eldest daughter of Richard Vernon and the Countess of Upper Ossory (née Lady Evelyn Leveson-Gower), at the house of her uncle Earl Gower in Whitehall. They had four children:

- Henry Greville, 3rd Earl of Warwick (1779–1853)
- Maj.-Gen. Sir Charles John Greville (1780-1836)
- Lady Henrietta Louisa Greville (1785 – 8 November 1838) married Thomas Scott, 2nd Earl of Clonmell on 9 February 1805
- Lady Augusta Sophia Greville (October 1787 - 2 March 1845), married Heneage Finch, 5th Earl of Aylesford on 23 April 1821

== As a peer ==
On 6 July 1773, Greville inherited his father's title of Earl of Warwick and left the House of Commons. He also left office on the Board of Trade in 1774, although he served as recorder of Warwick from 1773 to 1816.

He became a colonel in the Warwickshire Fencibles in 1795, and was appointed Lord Lieutenant of Warwickshire in that year, which office he held until his death on 2 May 1816 in London. He was buried at Warwick on 12 May 1816.

The Lives of Celebrated Persons records that "the latter part of the Earl's life was in penury, mortification and wretchedness." The Biographical Index to the House of Lords records that "this peer has evinced a predominant taste for chymistry, and if we mistake not greatly, a patent for soap for the navy that will not curdle in salt water was taken out in his name."

== Collector and Patron ==
George Greville was arguably one of the greatest contributors to the Greville Collection at Warwick Castle. His greatest purchase was the infamous Warwick Vase, acquired from his Uncle Sir William Hamilton by 1778. Although he furnished the Castle with several works from Classical Antiquity, his principal interest was in portraits. He amassed in his own words a "matchless collection of pictures by Sir Peter Paul Rubens and Sir Anthony van Dyck", several of which are still in the collection at Warwick Castle. The first in-depth inventory of pictures dates from 1809, and records the wide range of pictures amassed by the Earl. However, it is still unclear which paintings were already in his father's collection, and exactly where he sourced the major works from.

The Earl was also a significant patron of contemporary artists. According to his friend Olivia Wilmot Serres George had spent £100,000 on beautifying the castle and that 'at that period [before the Earl's bankruptcy] artists of celebrated fame were liberally supported at the castle, and generously remunerated for their labour'.

He was patron to John Higton, it being thought that he was introduced to Higton by his brother Charles Francis Greville, the friend of Higton's patron Lord Sedley (Henry Venables-Vernon, 3rd Baron Vernon). However, it has only recently been understood that Greville's wife, Henrietta Vernon, was the half sister of John FitzPatrick, Lord Gowran (later 2nd Earl of Upper Ossory) via the first Marriage of her Mother (Lady Evelyn Leveson-Gower), and a cousin of Lord Sedley (later Venables-Vernon) via her father Richard Vernon. Therefore, Higton's portraits of Warwick Castle, combined with those of Dogs belonging to George Greville, Lord Sedley, and John Fitzpatrick, perhaps reflect a more intimate relationship with the family, and their circle, than was understood.

He was also the first aristocratic patron to George Romney, from whom he commissioned several portraits of his children and two wives. He was most likely to have been introduced to Romney through Richard Cumberland (dramatist), and both probably encouraged him to depart on his travels to Italy in 1772. Although Greville had commissioned Romney to purchase paintings on his behalf in Italy, lack of pictures of quality meant that he returned empty handed. His brother Charles Francis Greville also sat to Romney, and introduced the artist to the muse Emma Hamilton. The offer of a studio in one of the towers of Warwick Castle was later turned down by the artist, who wished to remain in London.

The Earl was also a patron of the artists John 'Warwick' Smith, John Westbrooke Chandler and George Augustus Wallis.

== See also ==
- Earl of Warwick
- List of owners of Warwick Castle

Parliament of Great Britain
Preceded by Henry Archer; Paul Methuen	Member of Parliament for Warwick with Henry Archer 1768; Paul Methuen 1768–1773; 1768–1773	Succeeded by Paul Methuen; Charles Francis Greville
Honorary titles
Preceded by The 1st Marquess of Hertford	Lord Lieutenant of Warwickshire; 1795–1816	Succeeded by The 2nd Marquess of Hertford
Peerage of Great Britain
Preceded by Francis Greville	Earl Brooke; Earl of Warwick; 1773–1816	Succeeded by Henry Greville
