= Charles John Greville =

British politician

The Honourable Sir Charles Greville KCB
- Born: 5 April 1780
- Died: 2 December 1836 (aged 56)
- Education: Winchester College
- Relatives: George Greville, 2nd Earl of Warwick (father); Henry Greville, 3rd Earl of Warwick (brother)
- Military career
- Allegiance: United Kingdom
- Branch: British Army
- Service years: 1795–1836
- Rank: Major-general
- Conflicts: Fourth Anglo-Mysore War; French Revolutionary Wars; Egypt Campaign; Napoleonic Wars; Walcheren Campaign; Peninsular War; Battle of Rolica; Battle of Vimeiro; Battle of Corunna; Battle of Salamanca; Siege of Burgos; Battle of Tordesillas; Battle of San Millan-Osma; Battle of Vitoria; Siege of San Sebastián; Battle of the Bidassoa; Battle of Nivelle; Battle of the Nive; Battle of Bayonne
- Awards: Army Gold Cross

Major-General Sir Charles John Greville KCB (5 April 1780 – 2 December 1836) was a British Army officer and politician.

The younger brother of the Earl of Warwick, Greville served in the British Army, becoming a major-general. He was also appointed colonel of the 98th (Prince of Wales's) Regiment of Foot.

At the 1812 UK general election, Greville was elected for the Tories in Warwick, serving until 1831. He stood again at the 1832 UK general election, winning the seat, but was unseated on petition. He was re-elected at the 1835 UK general election, this time for the new Conservative Party, but stood down in 1836 by accepting the Chiltern Hundreds. He died later in the year.

Military offices
Preceded by Sir Samuel Hinde	Colonel of the 98th (Prince of Wales's) Regiment of Foot; 1832–1836	Succeeded by John Ross
Preceded by The Earl Ludlow	Colonel of the 38th (1st Staffordshire) Regiment of Foot; 1836	Succeeded by Sir Henry Pigot
