= John Savile, 3rd Earl of Mexborough =

British peer and politician

Arms of Savile: Argent, on a bend sable three owls of the field

John Savile, 3rd Earl of Mexborough (3 July 1783 – 25 December 1860), styled Viscount Pollington until 1830, was a British peer and Tory politician.

== Origins ==
He was the son of John Savile, 2nd Earl of Mexborough by his wife Elizabeth Stephenson, a daughter of Henry Stephenson.

== Political career ==
At the 1807 general election, Mexborough was returned as a Member of Parliament (MP) for Pontefract, having unsuccessfully contested the seat in 1806. He was defeated at the 1812 general election, but won the seat back at by-election in December 1812, and held it until he stood down at the 1826 election. He was re-elected in 1831, but did not stand again at the 1832 general election.

He succeeded his father in the earldom in 1830. However, as this was an Irish peerage it did not entitle him to a seat in the House of Lords.

== Marriage and children ==
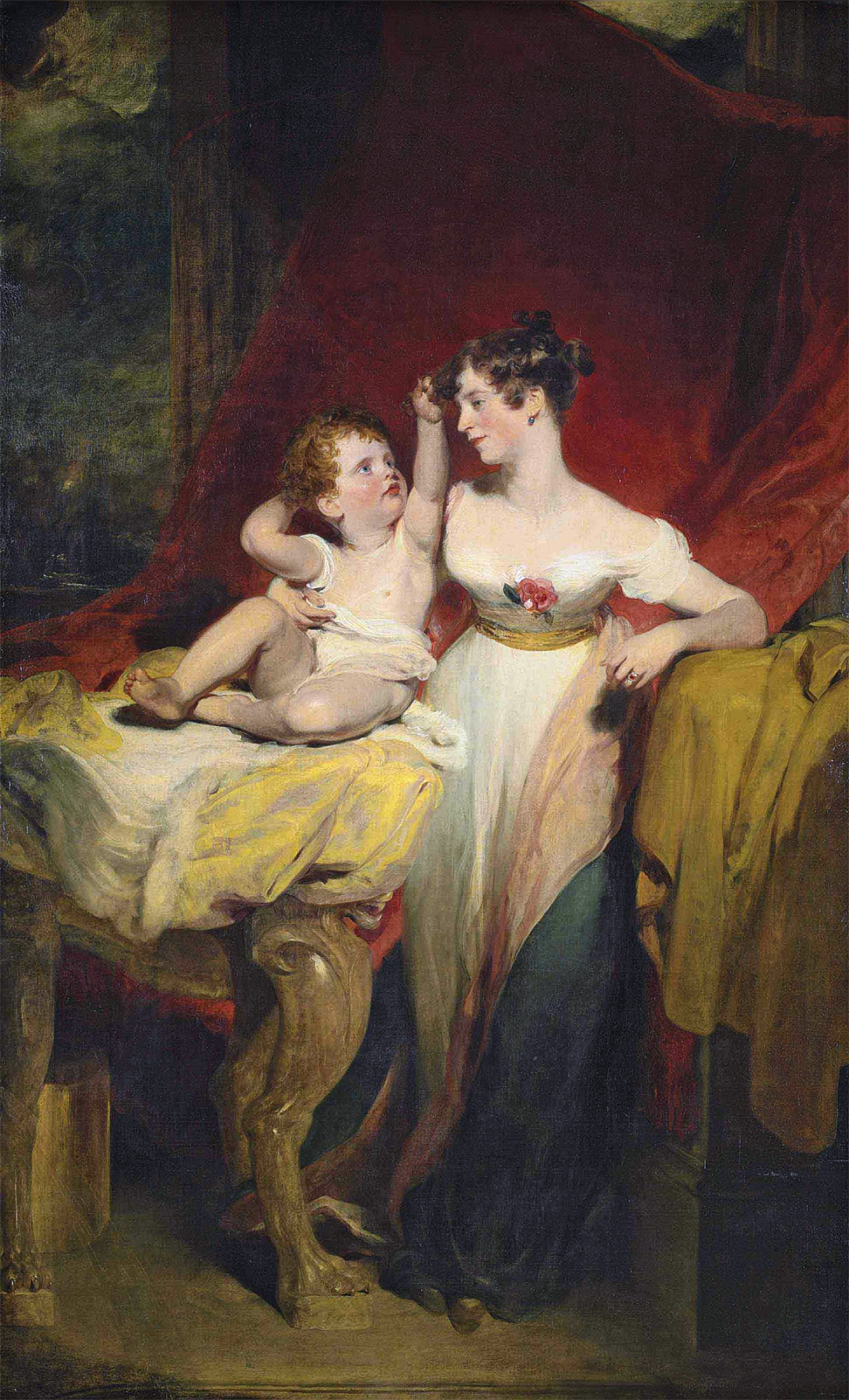
Lady Anne Yorke (d.1870), (then Viscountess Pollington, later Countess of Mexborough), wife of John Savile, 3rd Earl of Mexborough. With her son, John Savile, 4th Earl of Mexborough. Portrait by Thomas Lawrence, Moretti Fine Art collection, London

In 1807, he married Lady Anne Yorke (d.1870), a daughter of Philip Yorke, 3rd Earl of Hardwicke by his wife Elizabeth Lindsay, a daughter of James Lindsay, 5th Earl of Balcarres. By Lady Anne Yorke he had six sons and one daughter:

- John Savile, 4th Earl of Mexborough (1810–1899), eldest son and heir
- Hon. Henry Alexander Savile (12 December 1811 – 1 March 1850)
- Lady Sarah Elizabeth Savile (28 January 1813 – 16 December 1890), married Hon. Sir James Lindsay, son of James Lindsay, 24th Earl of Crawford
- Rev. Hon. Philip Yorke Savile (23 August 1814 – 23 July 1897), married Emily Mary Brand Hale
- Hon. Charles Stuart Savile (23 February 1816 – 1 March 1870), diplomat and author, married Paulina Mary Ann King
- Hon. Frederick Savile (17 March 1817 – 3 April 1851), married Antonia Archdall
- Rev. Hon. Arthur Savile (20 December 1819 – 23 April 1870), married Lady Georgina Neville, daughter of 3rd Baron Braybrooke

== Death ==
He died in December 1860, aged 87, and was succeeded in the earldom by his eldest son, John Savile, 4th Earl of Mexborough.

Parliament of the United Kingdom
Preceded by John Smyth; Robert Pemberton Milnes	Member of Parliament for Pontefract; 1807–1812; With: Robert Pemberton Milnes	Succeeded by Robert Pemberton Milnes; Hon. Henry Lascelles
Preceded by Robert Pemberton Milnes; Hon. Henry Lascelles	Member of Parliament for Pontefract; 1812–1826; With: Robert Pemberton Milnes 1812–1818; Thomas Houldsworth 1818–1826	Succeeded by Thomas Houldsworth; Le Gendre Starkie
Preceded by Sir Culling Eardley Smith, Bt; Hon. Henry Stafford-Jerningham	Member of Parliament for Pontefract; 1831–1832; With: Hon. Henry Stafford-Jerningham	Succeeded by Hon. Henry Stafford-Jerningham; John Gully
Peerage of Ireland
Preceded by John Savile	Earl of Mexborough; 1830–1860	Succeeded by John Charles George Savile
