= John Savile, 2nd Earl of Mexborough =

British peer and politician

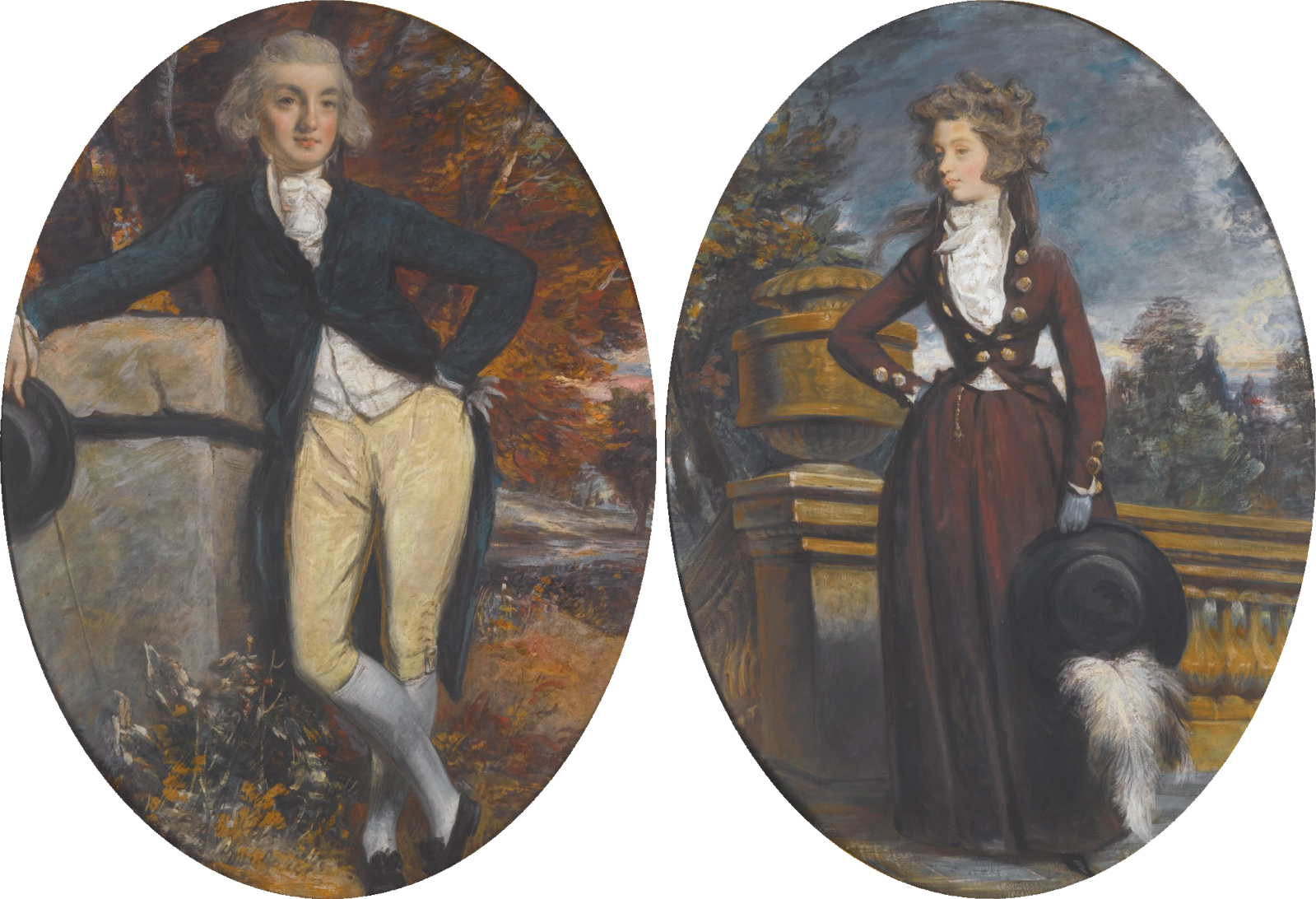
John Savile, 2nd earl of Mexborough and Lifford, and his wife Elizabeth (Daniel Gardner)

Arms of Savile: Argent, on a bend sable three owls of the field

John Savile, 2nd Earl of Mexborough (8 April 1761 – 3 February 1830), styled Viscount Pollington between 1766 and 1778, was a British peer and politician.

== Background ==
Mexborough was the son of John Savile, 1st Earl of Mexborough, and Sarah (née Delaval).

== Political career ==
Mexborough succeeded his father in the earldom in 1778. However, as this was an Irish peerage it did not entitle him to a seat in the British House of Lords (although it did entitle him to a seat in the Irish House of Lords until the Acts of Union 1800). In 1808 he was elected to the House of Commons for Lincoln, a seat he retained until 1812.

== Family ==
Lord Mexborough married Elizabeth, daughter of Henry Stephenson, in 1782. Elizabeth died in 1821 and is buried in the church at Methley with a monument by Robert Blore.

He died in February 1830, aged 68, and was succeeded in the earldom by his son, John.

Parliament of the United Kingdom
Preceded by Richard Ellison; William Monson	Member of Parliament for Lincoln; 1808–1812; With: Richard Ellison	Succeeded by John Nicholas Fazakerley; Sir Henry Sullivan
Peerage of Ireland
Preceded by John Savile	Earl of Mexborough; 1778–1830	Succeeded by John Savile
