= Edward Rich =

Edward Rich may refer to:

- Edward Rich, 6th Earl of Warwick, 3rd Earl of Holland (1673–1701)
- Edward Rich, 7th Earl of Warwick, 4th Earl of Holland (1697–1721)
- Edward Rich, 8th Earl of Warwick, 5th Earl of Holland (1695–1759)

== See also ==
- Edward Riche, Canadian writer
