= Marie Fox =

French-born English writer

Princess Marie of Liechtenstein
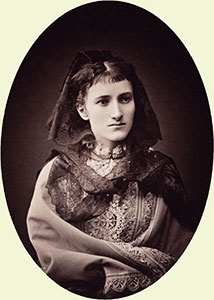
- This albumen print of Marie, produced around 1872, was acquired by Queen Victoria and is now part of the Royal Collection.
- Born: 21 December 1850; Paris, France
- Died: 26 December 1878 (aged 28); Schloss Burgstall, Styria
- Spouse: Prince Aloys of Liechtenstein (m. 1872)
- Issue: Princess Sophie, Mrs. Ürményi; Princess Julie; Princess Henriette; Princess Marie, Countess of Meran, Baroness of Brandhofen
Names
- Marie Henriette Adélaïde Fox
- Father: Unknown; Henry Edward Fox, 4th Baron Holland (adoptive)
- Mother: Victoire Magny; Lady Mary Augusta Coventry (adoptive)

Princess Marie of Liechtenstein (born Marie Henriette Adélaïde Fox; 21 December 1850 – 26 December 1878) was a French-born English writer. A foundling of unknown paternity, she was adopted by the childless English nobleman Henry Fox, 4th Baron Holland (1802–1859) and his wife, and eventually married into the Princely House of Liechtenstein.

== Background ==
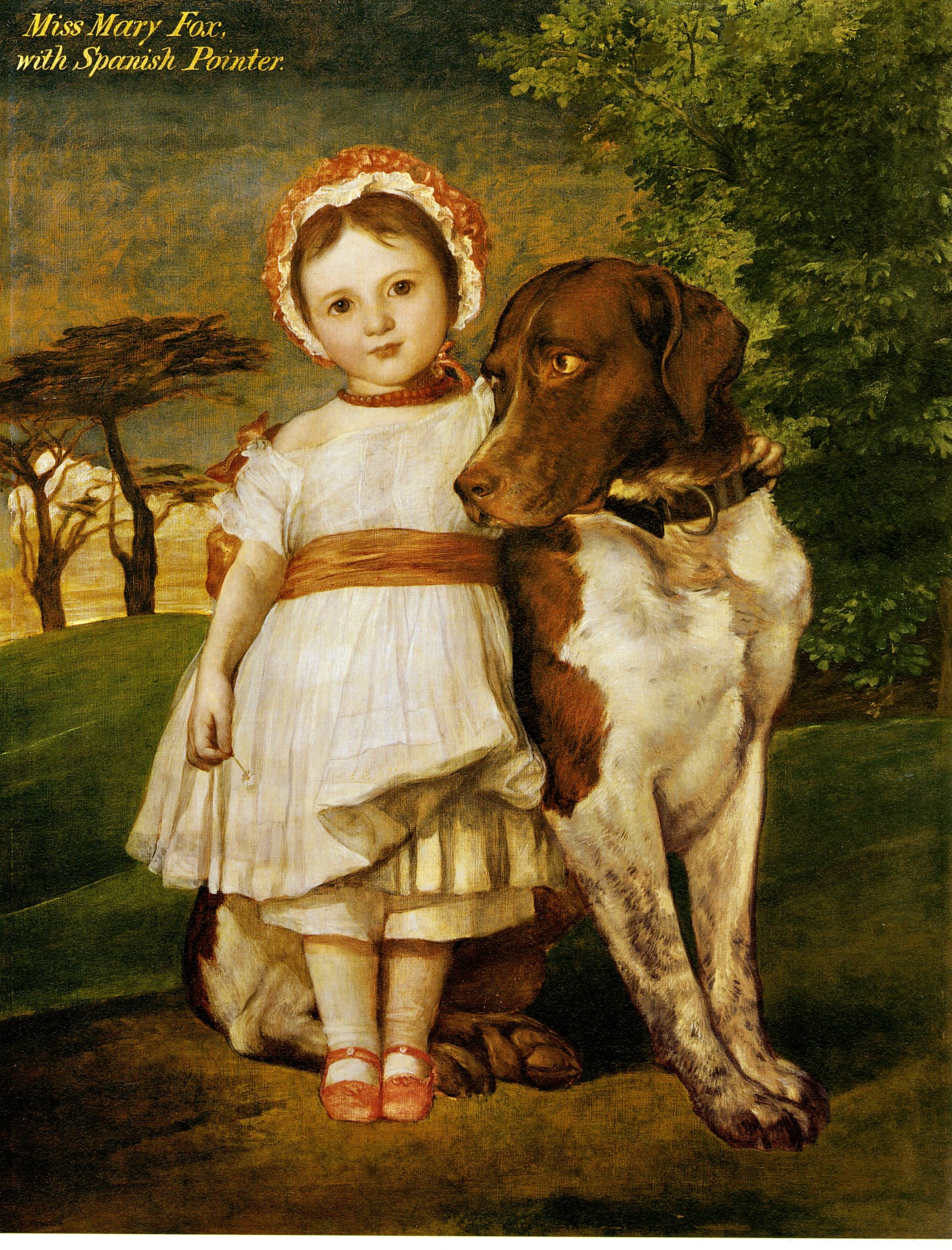
Marie Fox, aged three, with her pointer dog Elia, painted by George Frederic Watts

Marie was born in Paris (though some sources wrongly say she was born in Florence) on 21 December 1850 (though some sources wrongly say she was born in January 1851). Her mother's name was given as Frenchwoman Victoire Magny of Soissons, but the identity of her father was unspecified. She was baptised at the Church of St. Augustine as Marie Henriette Adélaïde.

In April 1851, aged three months, Marie was found by a physician called Dr. Séguin, who arranged for her to be adopted by the childless English aristocrat Henry Fox, 4th Baron Holland (1802–1859), of Holland House in Kensington, near London, and his wife Lady Mary Augusta Coventry (1812–1889), a daughter of George Coventry, 8th Earl of Coventry. Lord and Lady Holland had no surviving children of their own, having suffered two stillbirths and one short-lived infant. Lady Holland was by then in her late thirties and Lord Holland insisted on adopting the girl.

Her biological paternity remains a mystery; one rumour had it that she was her adoptive father's natural daughter born by his servant.

== Life in London ==
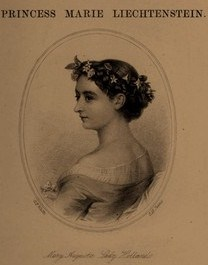
An illustration of Marie on the cover of her book, Holland House

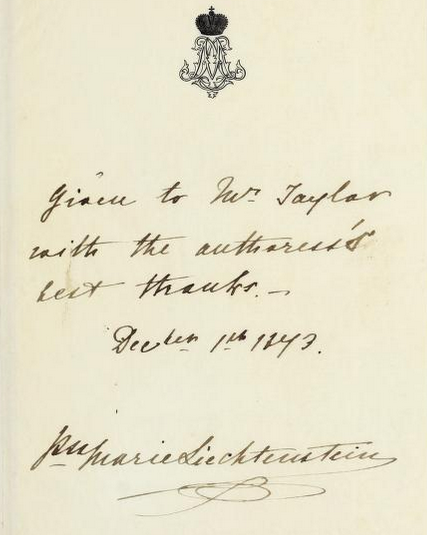
Signed flyleaf in a copy of her book Holland House, dated 1873

Following the adoption, Marie was assigned to a nurse at Fontenay-aux-Roses and then a nanny, Madame Marque, before moving to her parents' residence, Holland House, London, in June 1853, at the age of 2 1/2. She grew up unaware of her background. Lord Holland died in 1859, when she was nine.

As she approached her eighteenth birthday and marriageable age, Lady Holland's legal advisor strongly recommended disclosing the information about the adoption to her. She complied, but her own lack of full knowledge about the matter continued to pose problems. All people who knew the truth about the identity of her biological parents had died by then. Marie eventually became estranged from her mother. Her paternal aunt, Lady Lilford, wrote in 1867: "Marie is much grown and improved. She is a very nice and affectionate girl, and has been thoroughly well educated."

== Marriage and children ==
At the age of sixteen, Marie was courted by Archibald Primrose, later 5th Earl of Rosebery, but refused to marry him as she was unwilling to renounce Roman Catholicism.

In the winter of 1871, which Marie spent with her mother in Naples, she was courted by Prince Louis of Liechtenstein, a first cousin of Johann II, Prince of Liechtenstein. Their engagement was announced in the spring. The marriage ceremony took place in Kensington pro-cathedral, London, on 27 June 1872 and was performed by Henry Edward Manning, Cardinal-Archbishop of Westminster. Among the guests were the Prince and Princess of Wales. The Princely House of Liechtenstein initially refused to approve the marriage on the grounds of inequality of birth, but the princess was later accepted in Vienna.

They had four daughters:

- Princess Sophie Maria Josepha (Berlin, 29 March 1873 – Graz, 2 March 1947), married in Graz on 31 July 1897 Franz Ürményi d'Ürmény (Ürmény, 14 January 1863 – Baden bei Wien, 20 February 1934), childless
- Princess Julie Margarethe Maria (Schloss Burgstall, 20 July 1874 – Mayerling, 3 July 1950), unmarried and childless
- Princess Henriette Maria Josefa (Schloss Burgstall, 6 July 1875 – Pertlstein, 21 April 1958), a Benedictine nun under the name Sister Adelgundis
- Princess Marie Johanna Franziska Sophie (Schloss Burgstall, 21 August 1877 – Vienna, 11 January 1939), married in Vienna on 7 June 1902 Count Franz Peter Johann, of Meran, Baron of Brandhofen (Graz, 5 October 1868 – Bad Aussee, 10 November 1949), and had six children

== Writer ==
Rumours about Marie's biological parentage continued to circulate throughout her marriage. Soon after the wedding the Marquis de Montaigu publicly denied the rumour that he was the princess's father and that her mother had died in childbirth.

In 1874, Marie published a book about Holland House and its art collection which sold well despite criticism from Abraham Hayward. Today her work is significant for the history of that great house. She also translated literature from German into English. George Frederic Watts painted portraits of Marie at least twice, one as a child standing with her pet Spanish pointer and another as a young woman.

== List of works ==
- Liechtenstein, Princess Marie, Holland House, 2 Vols., London, 1874. Illustrated with 38 mounted woodbury-type prints; engravings, lithographs, etc.
  - Volume 1
  - Volume 2
  - Volumes 1 & 2, 3rd Edition, 1875

== Death ==
Marie died at Schloss Burgstall in Styria on 26 December 1878, aged 28.
