= List of trials of peers in the House of Lords =

This is a list of trials of peers in the House of Lords. Until 1948, peers of the United Kingdom and its predecessor states had the right to trial by their equals.

Year	Peer	Charge	Verdict	Sentence
1499	Edward Plantagenet, 17th Earl of Warwick	Treason	Pleaded guilty	Death
1521	Edward Stafford, 3rd Duke of Buckingham	Treason	Guilty	Death
1534	William Dacre, 3rd Baron Dacre	Treason	Not guilty	
1536	Queen Anne Boleyn	Treason	Guilty	Death
1536	George Boleyn, Viscount Rochford	Treason	Guilty	Death
1541	Thomas Fiennes, 9th Baron Dacre	Murder	Guilty	Death
1551	Edward Seymour, 1st Duke of Somerset	Treason	Guilty of felony	Death
1553	John Dudley, 1st Duke of Northumberland	Treason	Guilty	Death
1571	Thomas Howard, 4th Duke of Norfolk	Treason	Guilty	Death
1589	Philip Howard, 20th Earl of Arundel and Surrey	Treason	Guilty	Death (died before sentence was carried out)
1600	Robert Devereux, 2nd Earl of Essex	Treason	Guilty	Death
1600	Henry Wriothesley, 3rd Earl of Southampton	Treason	Guilty	Death (pardoned)
1603	Thomas Grey, 15th Baron Grey de Wilton	Treason	Guilty	Death (commuted to imprisonment)
1603	Henry Brooke, 11th Baron Cobham	Treason	Guilty	Death (commuted to imprisonment)
1616	Robert Carr, 1st Earl of Somerset	Murder	Guilty	Death (pardoned)
1616	Frances Carr, Countess of Somerset	Murder	Pleaded guilty	Death (pardoned)
1631	Mervyn Tuchet, 2nd Earl of Castlehaven	Rape and sodomy	Guilty	Death
1641	Thomas Wentworth, 1st Earl of Strafford	Treason	Prosecution dropped	
1666	Thomas Park, 15th Baron Morley	Murder	Guilty of manslaughter	Pleaded privilege*
1678	Charles Cornwallis, 3rd Baron Cornwallis	Murder	Not guilty	
1678	Philip Herbert, 7th Earl of Pembroke	Murder	Guilty of manslaughter	Pleaded privilege*
1680	William Howard, 1st Viscount Stafford	Treason	Guilty	Death
1686	Henry Booth, 1st Baron Delamer	Treason	Not guilty	
1692	Charles Mohun, 4th Baron Mohun	Murder	Not guilty	
1699	Edward Rich, 6th Earl of Warwick and Holland	Murder	Guilty of manslaughter	Pleaded privilege*
1699	Charles Mohun, 4th Baron Mohun	Murder	Not guilty	
1716	James Radclyffe, 3rd Earl of Derwentwater	Treason	Pleaded guilty	Death
1716	William Widdrington, 4th Baron Widdrington	Treason	Pleaded guilty	Death (pardoned)
1716	William Maxwell, 5th Earl of Nithsdale	Treason	Pleaded guilty	Death (escaped)
1716	Robert Dalzell, 5th Earl of Carnwath	Treason	Pleaded guilty	Death (pardoned)
1716	William Gordon, 6th Viscount Kenmure	Treason	Pleaded guilty	Death
1716	William Murray, 2nd Lord Nairne	Treason	Pleaded guilty	Death (pardoned)
1716	George Seton, 5th Earl of Winton	Treason	Guilty	Death (escaped)
1717	Robert Harley, 1st Earl of Oxford and Mortimer	Treason	Not guilty	
1746	William Boyd, 4th Earl of Kilmarnock	Treason	Pleaded guilty	Death
1746	George Mackenzie, 3rd Earl of Cromartie	Treason	Pleaded guilty	Death (pardoned)
1746	Arthur Elphinstone, 6th Lord Balmerinoch	Treason	Guilty	Death
1747	Simon Fraser, 11th Lord Lovat	Treason	Guilty	Death
1760	Laurence Shirley, 4th Earl Ferrers	Murder	Guilty	Death
1765	William Byron, 5th Baron Byron	Murder	Guilty of manslaughter	Pleaded privilege*
1776	Elizabeth Pierrepont, Duchess of Kingston-upon-Hull	Bigamy	Guilty	Pleaded privilege*
1841	James Brudenell, 7th Earl of Cardigan	Duelling	Not guilty	
1901	Frank Russell, 2nd Earl Russell	Bigamy	Guilty	3 months' detention
1935	Edward Russell, 26th Baron de Clifford	Manslaughter	Not guilty	
*These were all capital crimes; the usual sentence was death. From 1547 if a peer or peeress was convicted of a crime, except treason or murder, he or she could claim "privilege of peerage" to escape punishment if it was their first offence. In all, the privilege was exercised five times, until it was formally abolished in 1841.
Lovell, C. R. (October 1949) "The Trial of Peers in Great Britain" The American Historical Review 55: 69–81

== Trials in the Irish House of Lords ==
Year	Peer	Charge	Verdict	Sentence
1628	Edmond Butler, 3rd Baron Dunboyne	Manslaughter	Not guilty	
1739	Henry Barry, 4th Baron Barry of Santry	Murder	Guilty	Death (pardoned)
1743	Nicholas Netterville, 5th Viscount Netterville	Murder	Not guilty	
1798	Robert King, 2nd Earl of Kingston	Murder	Not guilty	
