= Charlotte Rich, Countess of Warwick =

English noblewoman (1680–1731)

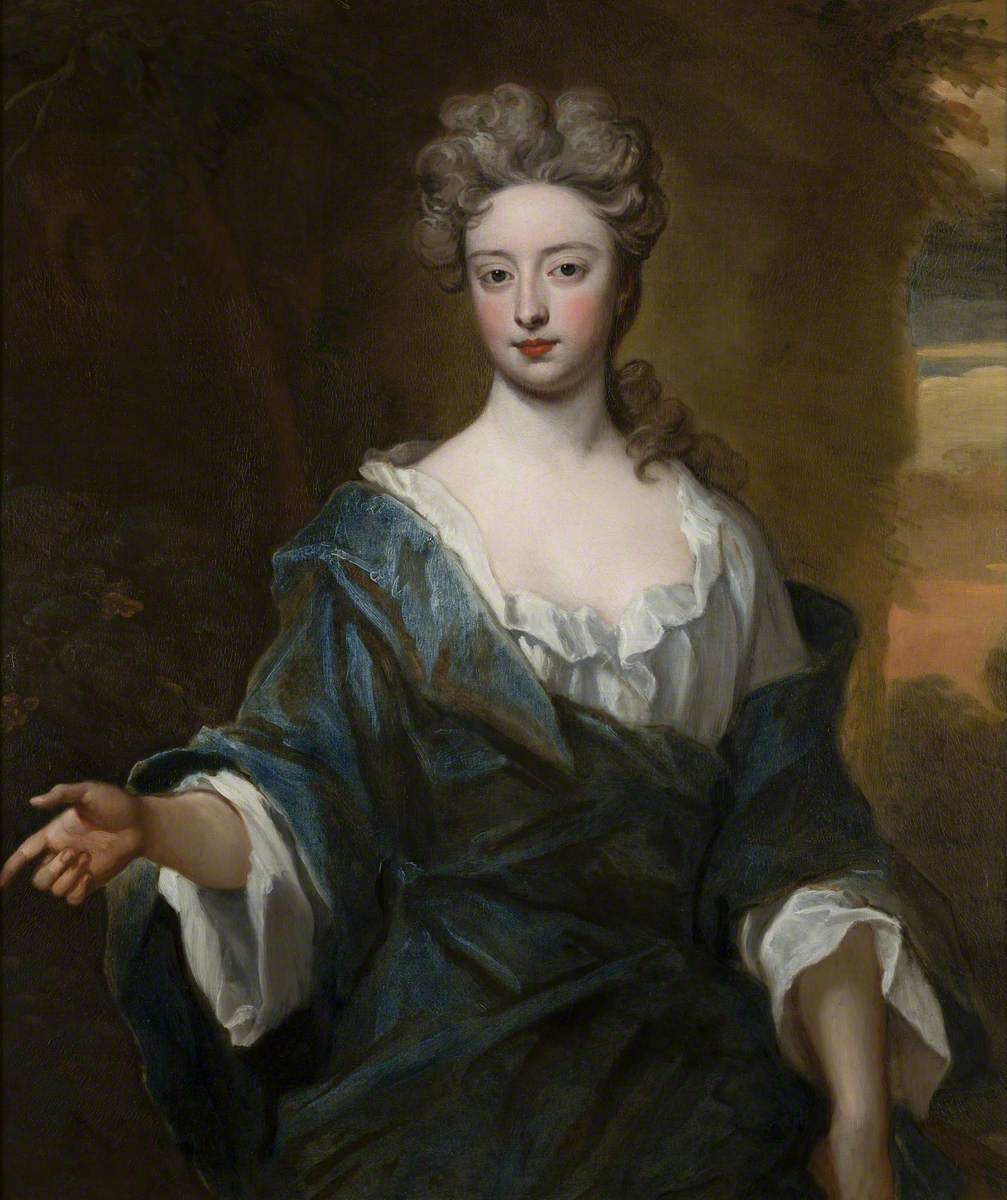
The Countess of Warwick, by Godfrey Kneller

Charlotte Rich, Countess of Warwick (1680–1731), formerly Lady Charlotte Myddelton, became Charlotte Addison after her second marriage. She was an English noblewoman and the wife of Edward Rich, 6th Earl of Warwick. Her second husband was the satirist Joseph Addison.

== Early life ==
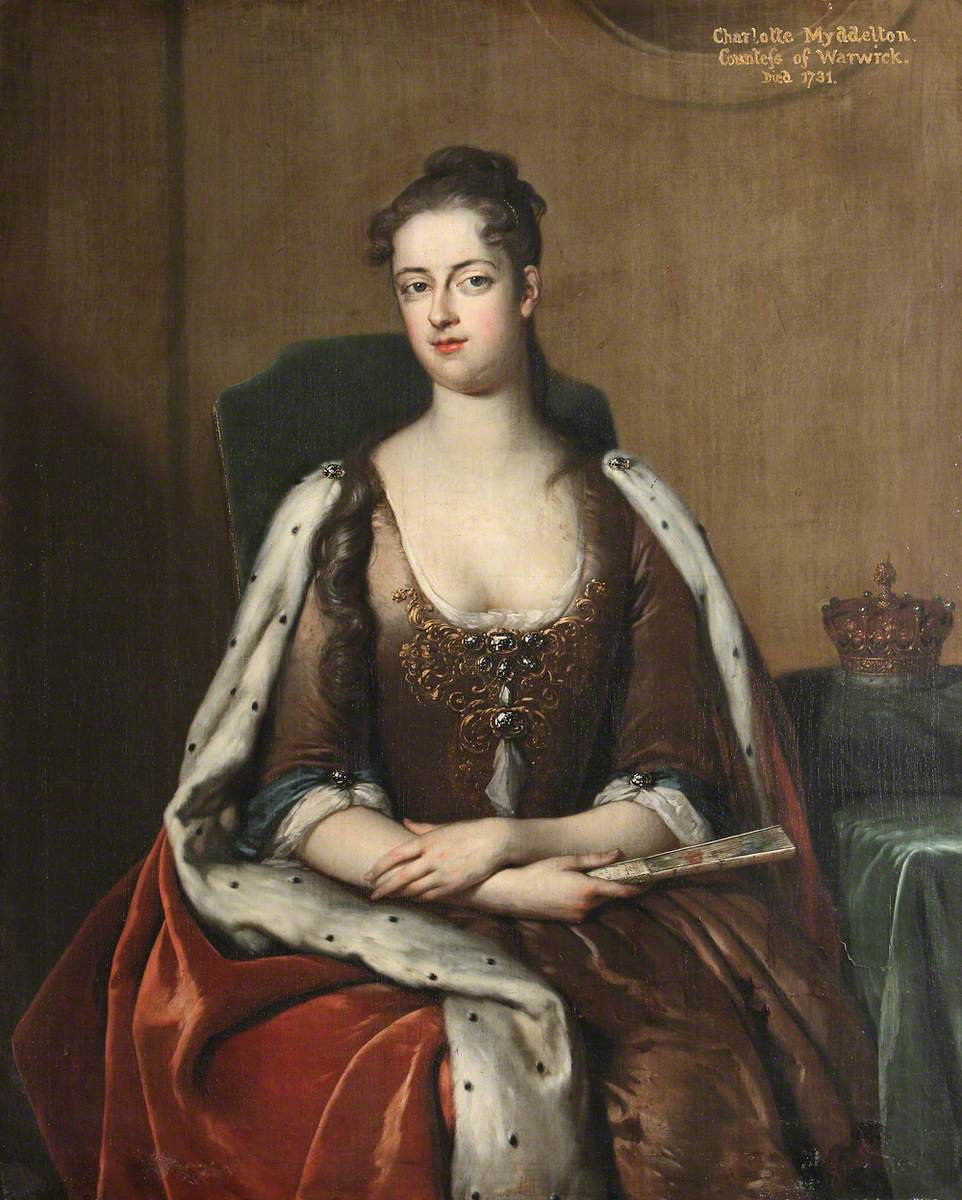
Portrait by Herman van der Mijn, c. 1726

Born Charlotte Myddelton, she was the daughter of Sir Thomas Myddelton, 2nd Baronet, of Chirk Castle, and his wife Charlotte Bridgeman (died 1694), herself the daughter of Sir Orlando Bridgeman, 1st Baronet, of Great Lever. She married Edward Rich in February 1697, thus making her Countess of Warwick and Holland. He died in 1701. Their only son was Edward Rich, 7th Earl of Warwick (1698–1721).

In 1716, she married Joseph Addison, who shortly afterwards became Secretary of State for the Southern Department. They had one daughter, Charlotte (died 1797), who inherited their home at Bilton Hall. In a biography of Addison, Samuel Johnson claimed that his wife treated him like a slave. Addison died in 1719.

The dowager countess was buried on 12 July 1731, alongside her first husband, at St Mary Abbots, Kensington. A portrait of her by Herman van der Mijn, dating from around 1726, is held by the National Trust at Chirk Castle.
