= Schloss Burgstall =

Austrian castle located in Sytria

- Styria, Austria
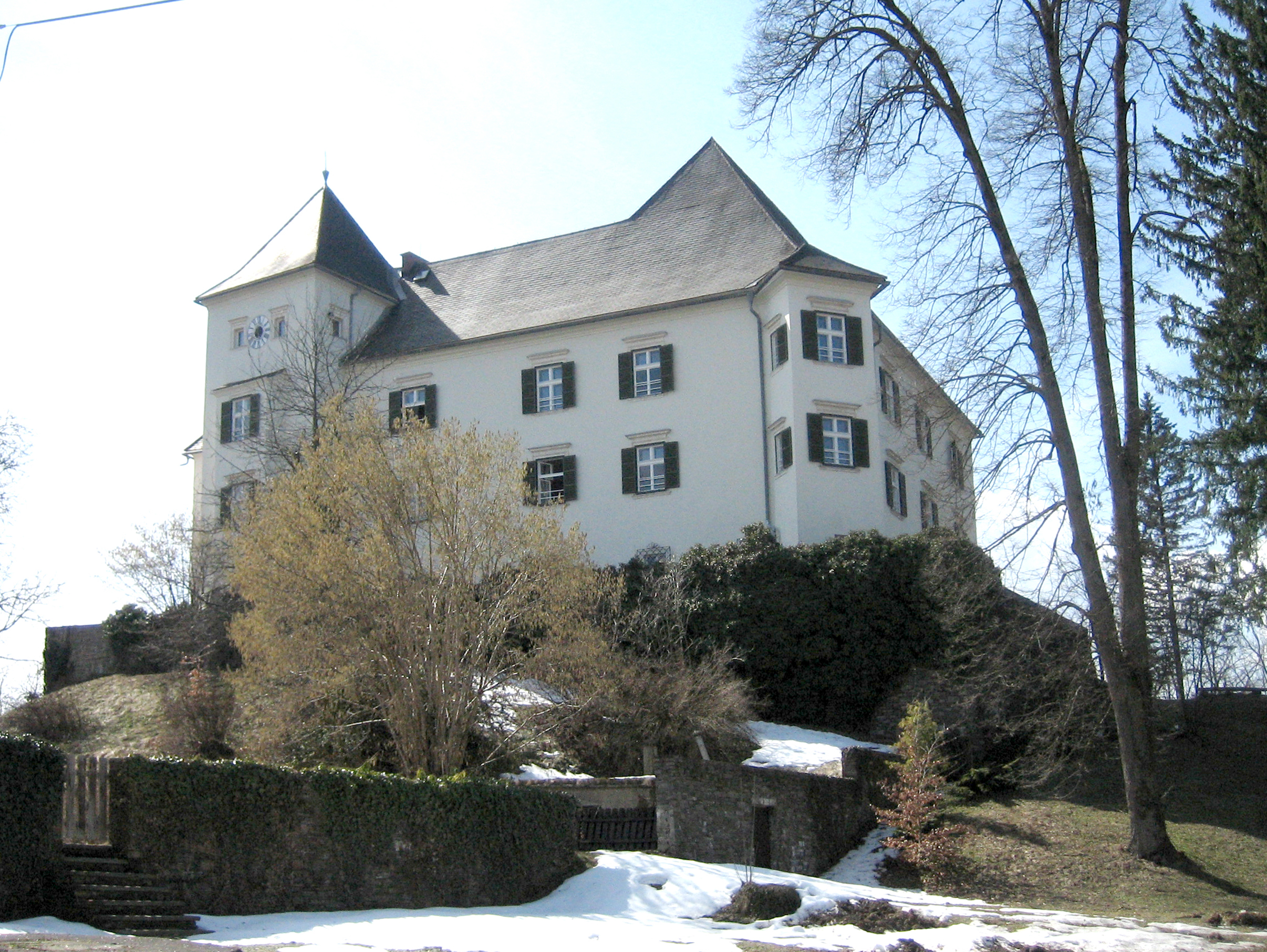
- Side View of Schloss Burgstall.

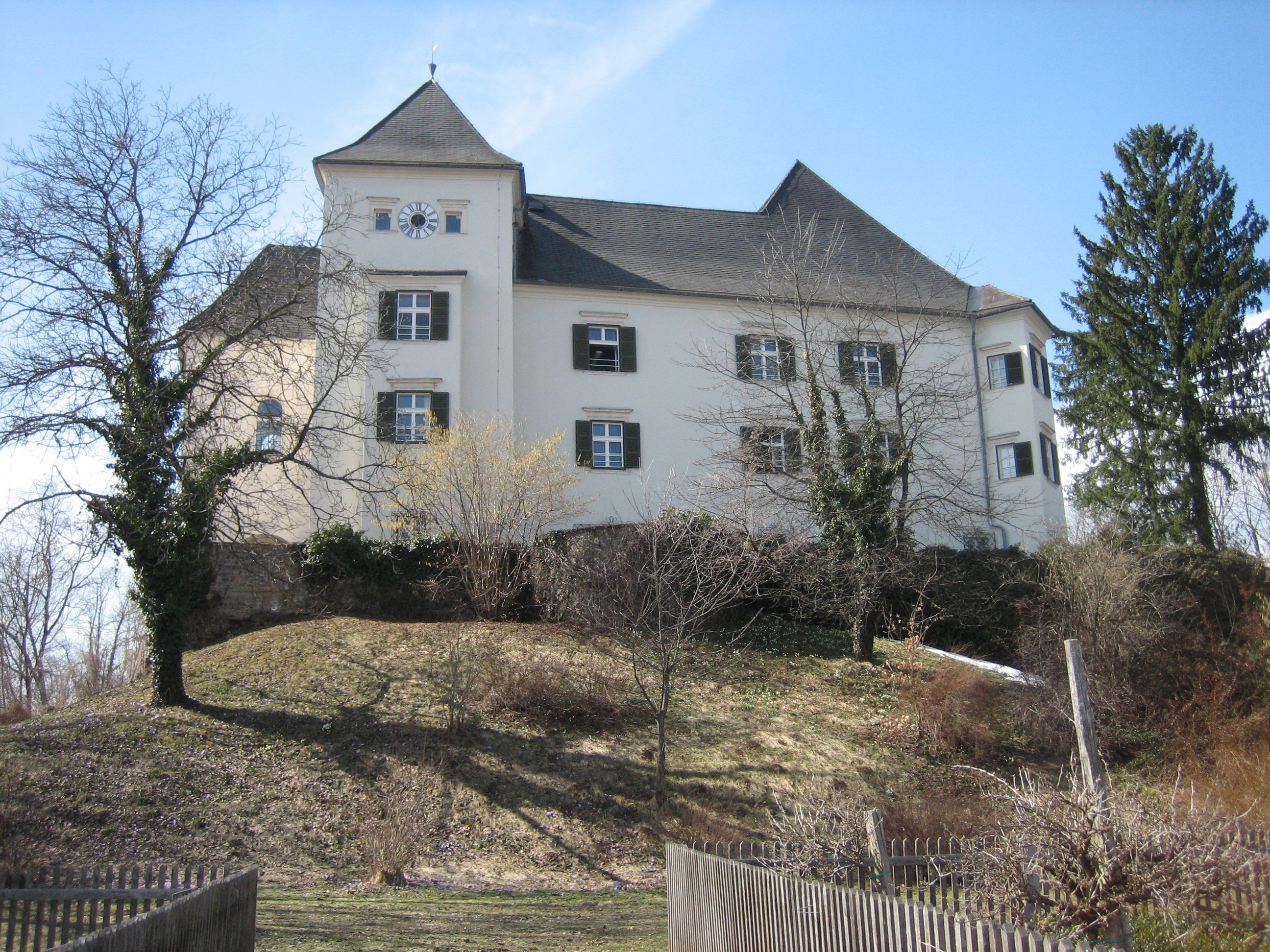
- Backside of Schloss Burgstall.

Site information
- Type: Castle
- Open to the public: by appointment
- Condition: used as vocational school

Location
- Coordinates: 46.7190°N 15.2647°E

Site history
- Built: 12th century

Schloss Burgstall is a historic castle located in the village of Wies, in the Deutschlandsberg District of southern Styria, Austria. Situated atop the Schlossberg hill above the market town, the site was first documented in 1280, although evidence suggests that a fortification may have existed there as early as the late 12th century. Originally known as Lackenberg, the castle was granted in 1240 by Emperor Frederick II to Kunigund, the daughter of the knight Albert von Purchstall. Today Schloss Burgstall houses a state-run agricultural vocational school (Fachschule Burgstall) and is not open to the public except by special arrangement: guided tours can be made by appointment.

== History ==
The origins of Schloss Burgstall trace back to a medieval stronghold located at the site known as Burgstall. During the Middle Ages, the castle came under the control of local nobility and subsequently the Habsburg rulers. By 1280, it was held by Ulrich Schenk von Rabenstein, who pledged the estate to the Bishopric of Seckau. In the 14th century, the Habsburg dukes resumed direct ownership and subsequently granted the property to a succession of stewards.

In 1476, the knight Paul von Eibiswald acquired the estate. The Eibiswald family retained ownership for nearly two centuries. Between 1578 and 1594, Georg Veit von Eibiswald initiated a reconstruction of the castle in the Renaissance style. The new design featured a four-wing layout arranged around a rectangular courtyard, including a three-story arcaded gallery (inner loggia). The structural form established during this period remains largely preserved.

In 1667, ownership of Schloss Burgstall passed by inheritance to Otto Wilhelm von Schrottenbach, who had married Maria Eleonora von Eibiswald. The estate remained in the Schrottenbach family until 1766, when it was inherited by Maria Anna von Schrottenbach, the widow of Count Herberstein. Known later as Duchess Maria Anna von Herberstein, she commissioned the nearby pilgrimage church Zum gegeißelten Heiland auf der Wies, constructed between 1774 and 1782.

In 1784, she leased Schloss Burgstall to Ignaz Ernst von Purgay, who purchased the property in 1799. The estate changed hands again in 1800, and by 1820 it was owned by Johann Drasch. In 1857, Prince Paul II of Liechtenstein acquired the castle, which remained in the possession of the Liechtenstein family until the end of World War I.

In 1919, engineer Alfred Neumann of Graz became the new owner. After his death, his widow Anna Neumann (née Kaiser) assumed ownership. Following her remarriage in 1942, she became Anna Felsner and retained the estate. In 1949, Schloss Burgstall was leased to the Styrian state government for use as a branch of the St. Martin agricultural school. In 1954, the state of Styria purchased the castle and its surrounding land. Since then, it has served as the Fachschule für Land- und Ernährungswirtschaft Burgstall, a vocational school specializing in agriculture and nutrition.

== Architecture ==
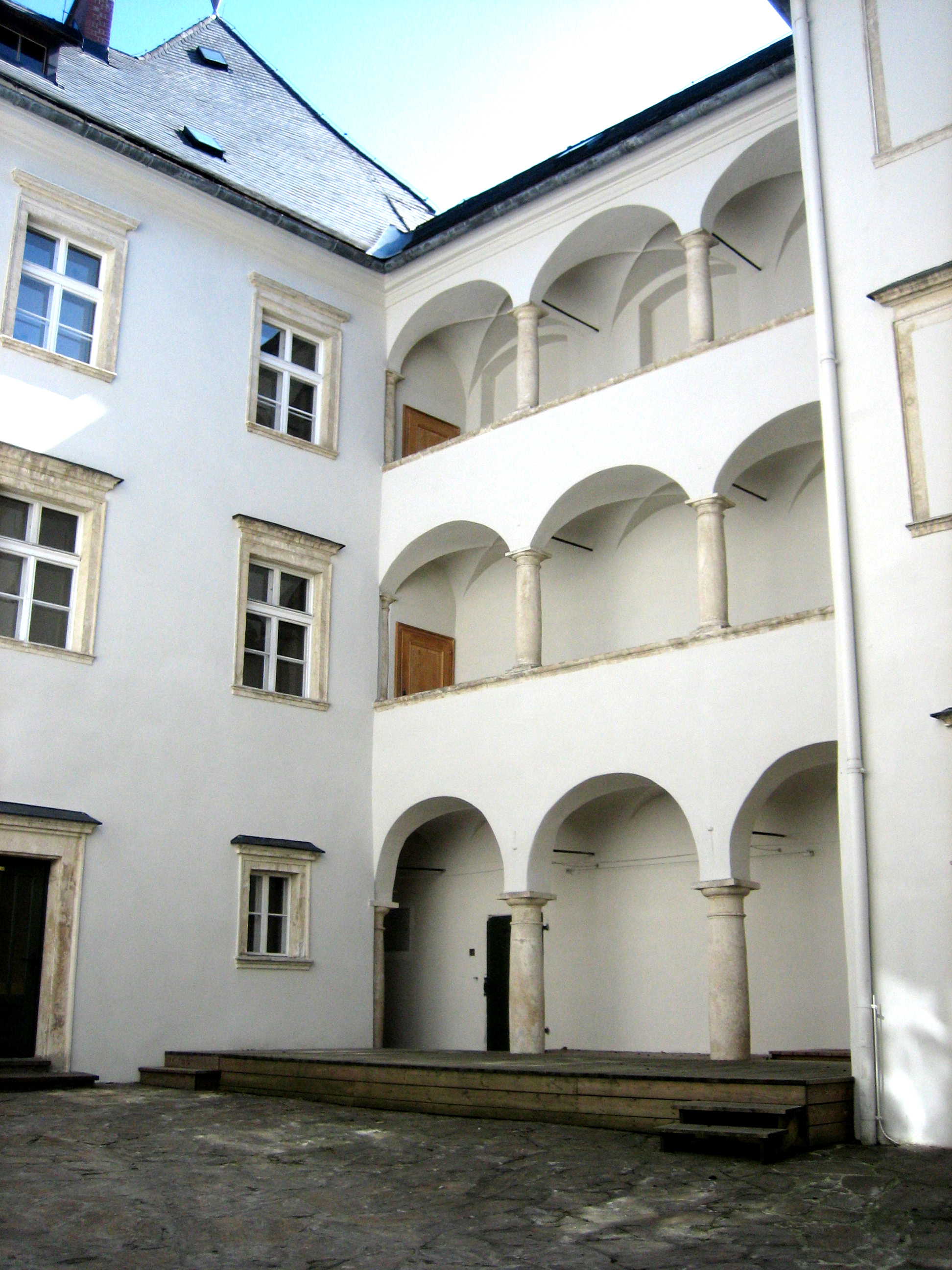
Courtyard view of Schloss Burgstall

Schloss Burgstall is a late Renaissance structure organized around a rectangular courtyard enclosed by four wings. The current architectural form dates to the period between 1578 and 1594, when Georg Veit von Eibiswald undertook a major reconstruction of the original medieval castle. A defining feature of the building is its three-story arcaded gallery (inner loggia) surrounding the courtyard, with triple arches on each level supported by robust stone columns, a common architectural motif in Renaissance-era buildings in the region.

The castle's exterior walls are plastered and whitewashed, and the steeply pitched gabled roof was originally clad in slate. Later renovations have aimed to preserve the historic Renaissance character of the structure. According to the architectural firm involved in recent additions, "preserving and enhancing the appearance of the Renaissance castle of Wies-Burgstall was the primacy of the design." As a result, Schloss Burgstall remains largely unchanged from its 16th-century layout and is considered a well-preserved example of Renaissance castle architecture in southern Styria.

== Current Use and Tourism ==
Following its acquisition by the state of Styria in 1954, Schloss Burgstall was repurposed as an educational facility. It currently serves as the site of the Fachschule Burgstall – St. Martin, a vocational school focused on agriculture and home economics. The building has been adapted to include classrooms, kitchens, and student dormitories. A major modernization and expansion of the school facilities took place in the early 21st century, culminating in the opening of a new wing in June 2016.

As the castle functions as an active school, it is not generally open to the public. However, guided tours may be arranged by telephone appointment through the school administration. Schloss Burgstall is included among the cultural landmarks of southern Styria and features on several hiking and vineyard routes in the area. The "Vineyard Path Wies" trail, for example, includes the castle grounds as one of its points of interest. Although most visitors experience the site from the exterior, formal tours are occasionally offered during school open days or cultural events.

== See also ==
- List of castles in Austria
- House of Habsburg
- House of Lichtenstein
