= Edward Rich, 8th Earl of Warwick =

English peer

Arms of Rich: Gules, a chevron between three crosses botonée or

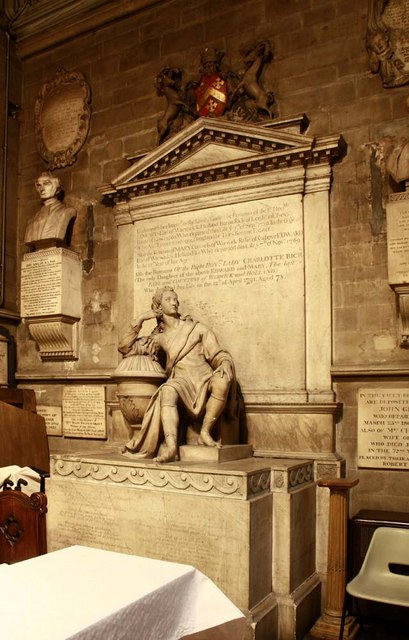
Monument to Edward Rich, 8th Earl of Warwick and 5th Earl of Holland, St Mary Abbots Church, Kensington

Edward Henry Rich, 10th Baron Rich, 8th Earl of Warwick and 5th Earl of Holland (1695–1759), of Holland House, Kensington, Middlesex, was an English peer.

== Career ==
Rich succeeded his second cousin Edward Rich, 7th Earl of Warwick, on his death in 1721.

== Marriage and progeny ==
In 1712 he married Mary Stanton (died on 7 Nov 1769), by whom he had one daughter:

- Lady Charlotte Rich (died 12 April 1791), only daughter and sole heiress.

== Death and burial ==
He died on 7 September 1759, without male progeny, thus his titles became extinct. His monument survives in St Mary Abbots Church, Kensington. Later that year Francis Greville, 1st Earl Brooke, successfully petitioned King George II for the vacant title of Earl of Warwick.

Peerage of England
Preceded by Edward Rich	Earl of Warwick; 1721–1759	Extinct
Preceded by Edward Rich	Earl of Holland; 1721–1759	Extinct
