= Edward Rich, 7th Earl of Warwick =

English peer (1698–1721)

- Born: January 1698
- Died: 16 August 1721 (aged 23)
- Parents: Edward Rich (father); Charlotte Myddelton (mother)

Edward Henry Rich, 9th Baron Rich, 7th Earl of Warwick and 4th Earl of Holland (January 1698 – 16 August 1721), of Holland House, Kensington, Middlesex, was an English peer and member of the House of Lords, styled Lord Rich until 1701 He is chiefly remembered as the stepson of the celebrated writer Joseph Addison.

== Biography ==
He was the only son of Edward Rich, 6th Earl of Warwick and his wife Charlotte Myddelton, only child of Sir Thomas Myddelton, 2nd Baronet. After his father's death, Charlotte in 1716 remarried the writer Joseph Addison, who had been her son's tutor. Edward and Addison are said to have quarrelled; according to a well-known story they did not meet for years until Addison was dying, when he invited his stepson to "see how a Christian dies".

In 1718, he was appointed a Gentleman of the Bedchamber to George, Prince of Wales, and on 19 May 1719, he became a Gentleman of the Bedchamber to George I.

Because he died so young it is perhaps difficult to form any firm judgment on his character. Even during his short life there seem to have been two opposing views. On one view he was a notorious wastrel, and the despair of his stepfather, hence Addison's deathbed remark to him about dying like a Christian. The other view was that he was "an exceptionally studious and intellectual young man", who in his short life was much loved by his friends and family. The fact that Addison's close friend Thomas Tickell dedicated his elegy on Addison's death to Warwick suggests that he was sincerely moved by his stepfather's death.

He died in 1721 and was succeeded by his cousin Edward Rich.

Peerage of England
Preceded by Edward Rich	Earl of Warwick; Earl of Holland; 1701–1721	Succeeded by Edward Rich
