= Edward Rich, 6th Earl of Warwick =

English peer (1673–1701)

The Right Honourable The Earl of Warwick
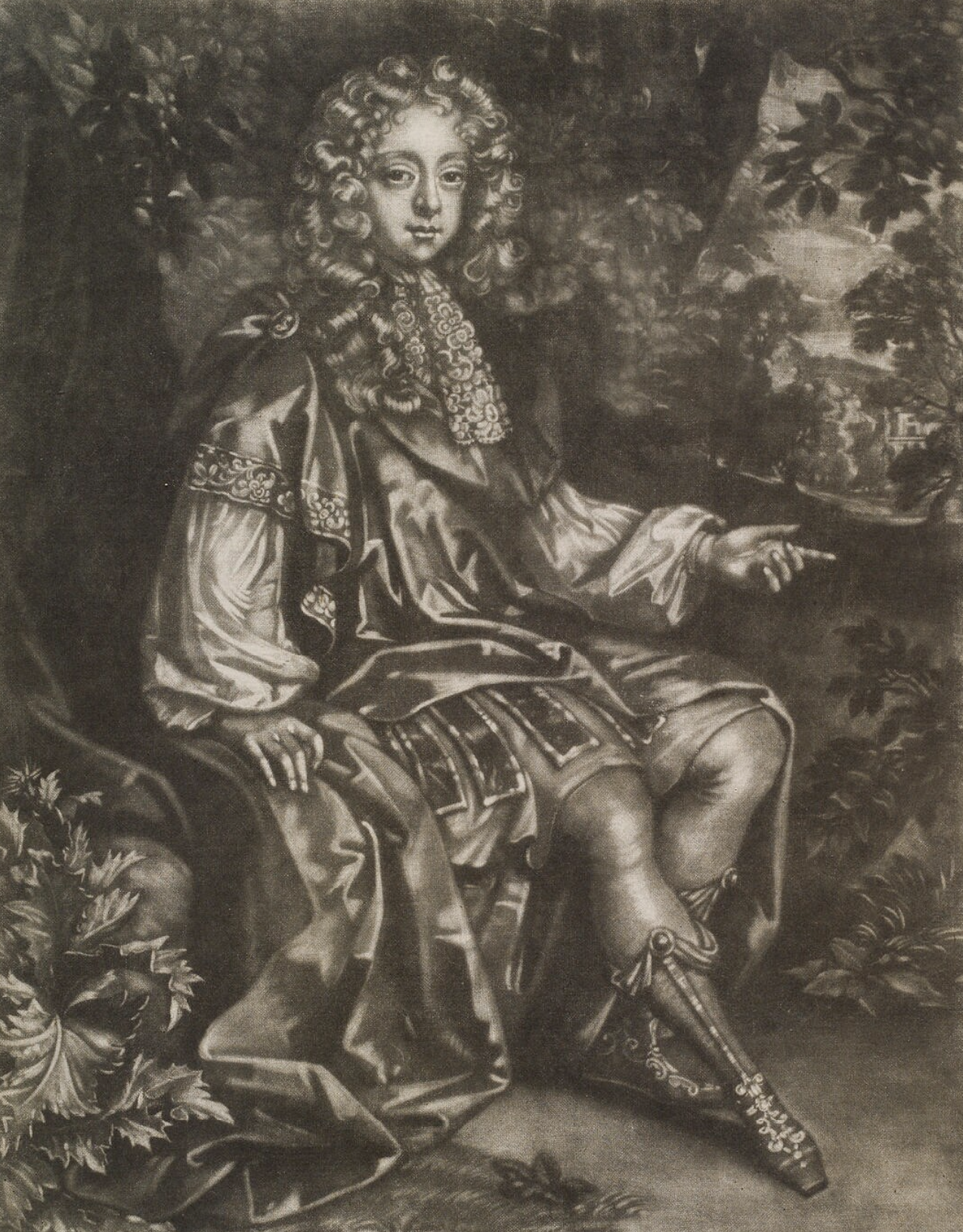
- Engraving by John Smith after a Willem Wissing portrait, 1684
- Born: c. 1673
- Died: 31 July 1701 (aged 27–28)
- Spouse: Charlotte Myddelton (m. 1697)
- Children: 1, Edward
- Father: Robert Rich, 5th Earl of Warwick

Edward Rich, 6th Earl of Warwick (c. 1673 – 31 July 1701), styled Lord Rich from 1673 to 1675, was an English peer.

== Biography ==
He was the son and heir of Robert Rich, 5th Earl of Warwick, 2nd Earl of Holland (1620–1675).

In 1675 he succeeded his father to the titles. In 1699, together with his friend Charles Mohun, 4th Baron Mohun, Warwick was tried for the murder of Richard Coote and was found guilty of manslaughter. He escaped punishment by pleading the privilege of peerage. He and Mohun had killed Coote in a duel and it was common for a seventeenth-century jury in such cases to take a lenient view of such matters.

He died in 1701 and was succeeded by his son Edward Rich, 7th Earl of Warwick (1698–1721).

== Marriage and children ==
In early 1697 he married Charlotte Myddelton, a daughter of Sir Thomas Myddelton, 2nd Baronet, by whom he had one son:

- Edward Rich, 7th Earl of Warwick (1698–1721)

Charlotte, who survived her husband, was later married to the celebrated writer Joseph Addison.

== Ancestry ==
Robert Rich, 1st Earl of Warwick
Henry Rich, 1st Earl of Holland
Penelope Devereux
Robert Rich, 5th Earl of Warwick
Sir Walter Cope
Isabel Cope
Dorothy Grenville
Edward Rich, 6th Earl of Warwick
Henry Montagu, 1st Earl of Manchester
Edward Montagu, Viscount Mandeville
Catherine Spencer
Anne Montagu
Robert Rich, 2nd Earl of Warwick
Anne Rich
Frances Hatton

Peerage of England
Preceded by Robert Rich	Earl of Warwick; Earl of Holland; 1675–1701	Succeeded by Edward Rich
