= Charles Greville, 7th Earl of Warwick =

British peer (1911–1984)

The Right Honourable The Earl of Warwick
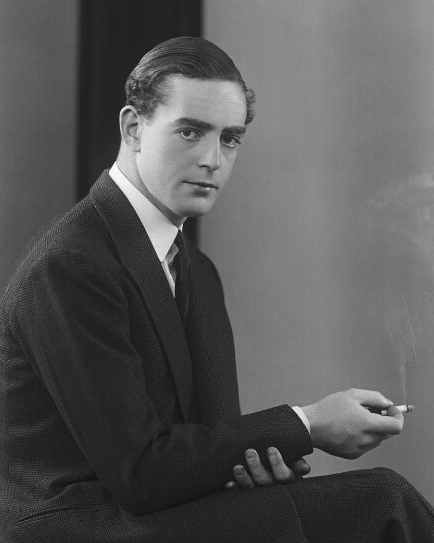
- The Earl of Warwick in 1933

Personal details
- Born: Charles Guy Fulke Greville; 4 March 1911 London, England
- Died: 20 January 1984 (aged 72) Rome, Italy
- Party: Conservative
- Spouses: Rose Bingham (m. 1933; div. 1938) Mary Kathleen Hopkinson (m. 1942; div. 1949) Janine Joséphine Detry de Marès (m. 1963)
- Children: David Greville, 8th Earl of Warwick
- Parent(s): Leopold Greville, 6th Earl of Warwick; Elfrida Marjorie Eden
- Relatives: Anthony Eden (uncle); John Eden (cousin); Nicholas Eden (cousin)
- Education: Eton College
- Nickname: The Duke of Hollywood

Charles Guy Fulke Greville, 7th Earl of Warwick, 7th Earl Brooke (4 March 1911 – 20 January 1984), was a British peer and the last Earl of Warwick to live at the family seat Warwick Castle before its sale in 1978. He became the first British aristocrat to star in a Hollywood movie, and was later nicknamed the Duke of Hollywood by the local press.

== Early life ==
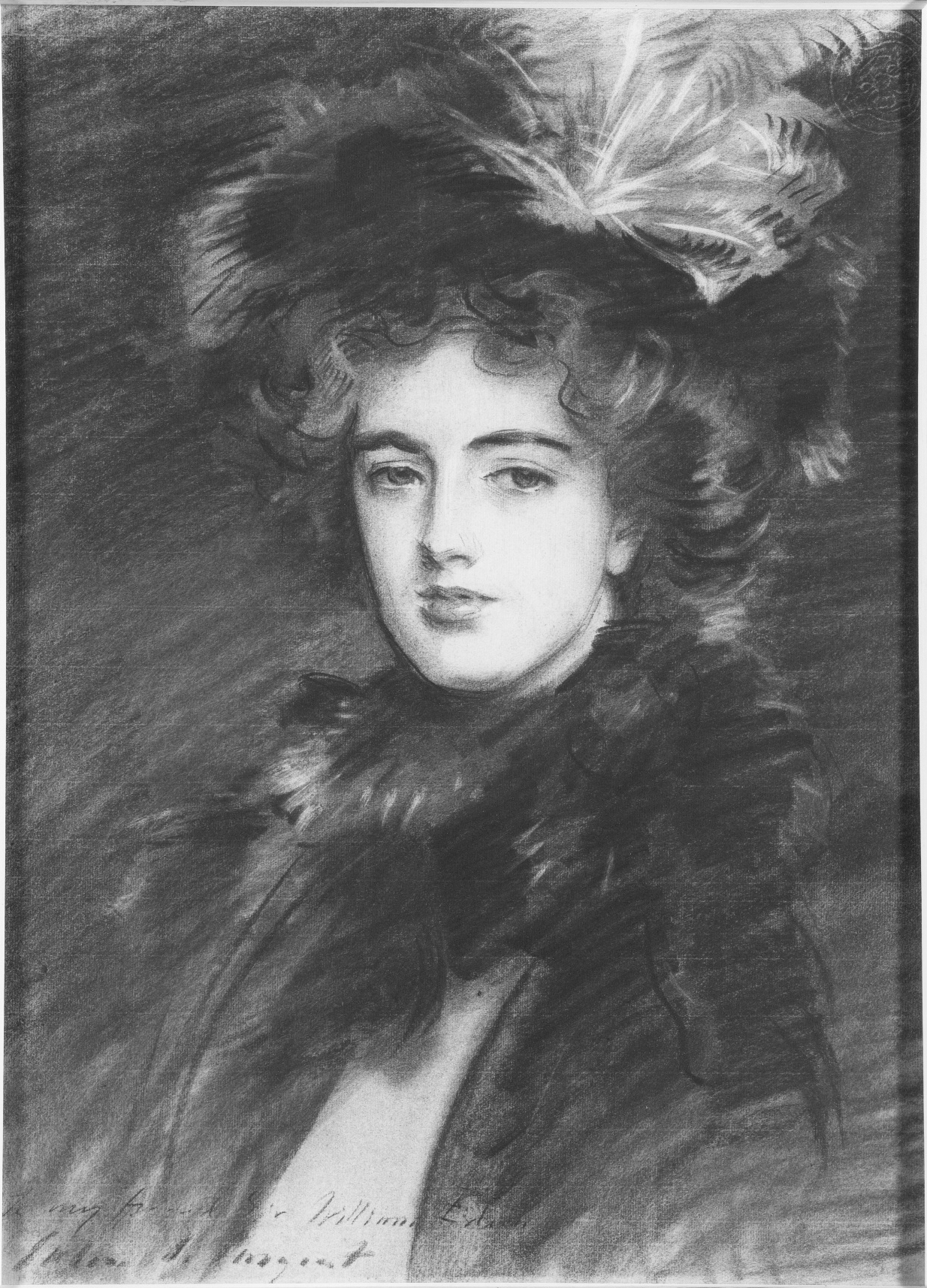
Portrait of his mother, Marjorie, Countess of Warwick, by John Singer Sargent.

Charles Guy Fulke Greville was born at 13a Lower Grosvenor Place West, London on 4 March 1911. He was the eldest son of Leopold Greville, 6th Earl of Warwick (1882–1928) and his wife Elfrida Marjorie Eden (1887–1943), the only daughter of Sir William Eden, 7th Baronet. "Fulkie", as he was known to intimates, had two younger brothers, Richard Francis Maynard Greville, a Governor of University College Hospital, and John Ambrose Henry Greville, who was killed in action in 1942 during World War II.

His paternal grandparents were Francis Greville, 5th Earl of Warwick and his wife, Daisy Greville, Countess of Warwick. His grandmother Daisy inherited the Maynard estates in 1865 from her grandfather, Henry Maynard, 3rd Viscount Maynard, and reportedly was a long-term mistress to the Prince of Wales, who later became King Edward VII.

Greville was educated at Eton and at Chillon College, Lake Geneva in Switzerland. He succeeded to the earldom at the age of 16 in January 1928, on the death of his father (who had only become the 6th Earl four years earlier in 1924). He joined the Grenadier Guards after completing his education.

== Career ==
=== Acting career ===
In the 1920s and 1930s, many British actors found work in the American film industry; Sheridan Morley called this the "Hollywood Raj". In 1936, Lord Warwick became the first British aristocrat to be offered a Hollywood contract by MGM. He was to receive £200 a year, and the services of a valet and secretary.

Newspaper reports at the time suggested his reasoning for taking a film contract was sex motivated. He referred to his wages as his own "pocket money" and that he was 'simply seeking a job like everyone else'. He used the stage name Michael Brooke to distance himself from his aristocratic background. After six months he was dropped by MGM resulting in a long court battle thereafter.

As the highest-profile Englishman in Hollywood, Charles became a celebrity figure with nicknames like 'The Duke of Hollywood' and 'Warwick the Filmmaker' (a pun on Warwick the Kingmaker). Listed with a string of high-profile affairs including Greta Garbo, Marlene Dietrich and Paulette Goddard, he was famed for socialising within celebrity circles.

In 1938, he was offered another chance at acting through Paramount. He finally got his chance to star in a movie and was given a lead role in The Dawn Patrol alongside David Niven and Errol Flynn. This would be his only mainstream movie however, and he was dropped thereafter.

=== The Earl of Warwick ===
Following his failure in America, and with the start of the Second World War, Warwick returned to the United Kingdom. Coventry, near his family seat, suffered tremendous aerial bombing, and he opened his home to evacuees from the city, as well as to the Ministry of Supply. It was rumoured that Nazi war criminal Rudolf Hess was held at Warwick Castle for one night while being transported from Scotland to London.

He was Mayor of Warwick between 1951 and 1952, organising great celebrations for the success of the boxer Randolph Turpin upon his becoming World Middleweight Champion, and hosted King George VI and Queen Elizabeth at Warwick Castle when they visited Warwick and Leamington in 1951.

Warwick was a Conservative member of the House of Lords; his political actions included successfully opposing certain agricultural measures. He supported his uncle Anthony Eden who succeeded Winston Churchill as Prime Minister in 1955.

=== Later life ===
In 1955, Lord Warwick bought houses in Switzerland, Italy, and France, and began travelling between the three. In 1957, he funded and established the Eagle Ski Club in Gstaad, Switzerland, becoming its first honorary President.

Throughout the next decade, Warwick, widely described as one of Britain's richest men, began to sell many of the family possessions, including estates in Warwick, heirlooms, and much of the armour collection at Warwick Castle. In 1969, he left England altogether to avoid British income taxes.

In 1967, he handed over control of his family estates to his son David Greville, Lord Brooke. His son sold Warwick Castle to Madame Tussauds in 1978, causing a public confrontation between father and son.

== Personal life ==
Lord Warwick was married three times. He was also engaged to Margaret Whigham, later Duchess of Argyll, but the engagement was broken off in March 1932.

His first marriage took place on 11 July 1933 to his second cousin, Rose Bingham, daughter of David Cecil Bingham (a granddaughter of the 5th Earl of Rosslyn and Gen. Sir Cecil Bingham and a descendant of the 4th Earl of Lucan). Before their 1938 divorce, Charles and Rose were the parents of one son:

- David Robin Francis Guy Greville, 8th Earl of Warwick (1934–1996), who married Sarah Anne Chester Beatty, daughter of Sir Alfred Chester Beatty (the "King of Copper"), in 1956. They divorced in 1967 and she married Harry Thomson Jones.

After their divorce, Rose married three more times before her death in 1972.

Lord Warwick's second marriage took place on 19 February 1942 to Mary Kathleen (née Hopkinson) Bell. Mary, the former wife of Harold Edward Bell, was the eldest daughter of Percy Clifford Hopkinson of Seabarn in Kingston Gorse. In 1947, he pleaded guilty to "cashing two checks at Cannes, France, thus receiving francs for pounds in violation of British Treasury regulations" and was fined £1,150. They divorced in 1949.

Lord Warwick married thirdly in November 1963 to Janine Joséphine Detry de Marès, a daughter of Georges Detry de Marès, a Belgian newspaper magnate.

Upon the death of Lord Warwick in Rome on 20 January 1984, David Greville, 8th Earl of Warwick, his only son by his first wife, inherited his titles. He was buried at St. Mary's Church, Warwick.

Warwick family tree including the peerages of Brooke, Holland, Kensington, and Warwick

Earl of Warwick (1st creation), 1088
Henry de Beaumont d. 1119; 1st Earl of Warwick	William de Warenne d. 1138; Earl of Surrey	Elizabeth de Vermandois c. 1085–1131; Countess of Leicester
Roger de Beaumont c. 1102–1153; 2nd Earl of Warwick	Gundred de Warenne
William de Beaumont (bef. 1140–1184); 3rd Earl of Warwick	Waleran de Beaumont d. 1204; 4th Earl of Warwick
Henry de Beaumont (c. 1192-1229); 5th Earl of Warwick	Alice de Newburgh
Thomas de Beaumont; 1208–1242; 6th Earl of Warwick	m1. John Marshal d. 1242; 7th Earl of Warwick jure uxoris	Margaret de Beaumont d. 1242; 7th Countess of Warwick suo jure	m2. John du Plessis d. 1263; 7th Earl of Warwick jure uxoris	Isabel de Mauduit	William Mauduit c. 1221–1268; 8th Earl of Warwick
William de Beauchamp c. 1238–1298; 9th Earl of Warwick
Guy de Beauchamp c. 1272–1315; 10th Earl of Warwick
Thomas Beauchamp c. 1313–1369; 11th Earl of Warwick
Thomas Beauchamp; 1338–1401; 12th Earl of Warwick
Richard Beauchamp; 1382–1439; 13th Earl of Warwick
Duke of Warwick, 1445
Margaret Beauchamp; 1404–1467	Henry Beauchamp; 1425–1446; Duke of Warwick, 14th Earl of Warwick	Richard of York; 1411–1460; Duke of York	Anne Beauchamp; 1426–1492; 16th Countess of Warwick	Richard Neville "the Kingmaker"; 1428–1471; 16th Earl of Warwick jure uxoris	Henry VI; 1421–1471; King of England
Dukedom of Warwick extinct, 1446
John Talbot; 1426–1453; Viscount Lisle	Anne Beauchamp; 1444–1449; 15th Countess of Warwick	George Plantagenet; 1449–1478; Duke of Clarence	Isabel Neville; 1451–1476	m2. Richard III; 1452–1485; King of England	Anne Neville; 1456–1485	m1. Edward of Westminster; 1453–1471; Prince of Wales
Elizabeth Talbot d. 1487	Edward Grey d. 1492; Viscount Lisle	Edward Plantagenet; 1475–1499; 17th Earl of Warwick
Earldom of Warwick (1st creation) forfeit, 1499
Elizabeth Grey c. 1482/1484–c. 1525/1526
Viscount Lisle (5th creation), 1542; Earl of Warwick (2nd creation), 1547	Baron Rich of Leez, 1547; See also Rich family tree
John Dudley c. 1502–1553; Duke of Northumberland, 1st Earl of Warwick, etc.	Richard Rich; 1496–1567; 1st Baron Rich
Fulke Greville d. 1559	John Dudley c. 1527–1554; 2nd Earl of Warwick, etc.	Ambrose Dudley c. 1530–1590; 3rd Earl of Warwick, etc.	Robert Dudley; 1532–1588; Earl of Leicester	Robert Rich c. 1538–1581; 2nd Baron Rich
Earldom of Warwick (2nd creation) and subsidiary title extinct, 1590
Earl of Warwick (3rd creation), 1618
Fulke Greville; 1536–1606	Robert Greville (?)	Robert Rich; 1559–1619; 1st Earl of Warwick, 3rd Baron Rich
Baron Brooke of Beauchamps Court, 1621	Baron Kensington of Kensington in the County of Middlesex (1st creation), 1623; Earl of Holland, 1624
Fulke Greville; 1554–1628 de jure 13th Baron Latimer, 5th Baron Willoughby de Broke, 1st Baron Brooke	Fulke Greville; 1575–1632	Robert Rich; 1587–1658; 2nd Earl of Warwick, 4th Baron Rich	Henry Rich; 1590–1649; 1st Earl of Holland, etc.
Robert Greville; 1607–1643; 2nd Baron Brooke	Anne Rich; 1604–1642; Countess of Manchester	Robert Rich; 1611–1659; 3rd Earl of Warwick, 5th Baron Rich	Charles Rich; 1623–1673; 4th Earl of Warwick, 6th Baron Rich
Francis Greville (bef. 1637–1658); 3rd Baron Brooke	Robert Greville; 1639–1677; 4th Baron Brooke	Fulke Greville; 1643–1710; 5th Baron Brooke	Anne Montagu (d. c. 1689)	Robert Rich; 1620–1675; 5th Earl of Warwick, 2nd Earl of Holland, etc., 7th Baron Rich	Cope Rich; 1634–1676
Francis Greville d. 1710	Elizabeth Rich d. 1725	Edward Rich; 1673–1701; 6th Earl of Warwick, 3rd Earl of Holland, etc., 8th Baron Rich	Cope Rich d. 1706
Fulke Greville c. 1693–1711; 6th Baron Brooke	William Greville; 1695–1727; 7th Baron Brooke	Francis Edwardes d. 1725	Edward Henry Rich; 1698–1721; 7th Earl of Warwick, 4th Earl of Holland, etc., 9th Baron Rich	Edward Rich; 1695–1759; 8th Earl of Warwick, 5th Earl of Holland, etc., 10th Baron Rich
Earldoms of Warwick (3rd creation) and Holland extinct, 1759
Earl Brooke, 1746; Earl of Warwick (4th creation), 1759	Baron Kensington (Ireland)
Francis Greville; 1719–1773; 1st Earl of Warwick, 1st Earl Brooke, 8th Baron Brooke	William Edwardes c. 1711–1801; 1st Baron Kensington
George Greville; 1746–1816; 2nd Earl of Warwick, 2nd Earl Brooke, 9th Baron Brooke
George Greville; 1772–1786 styled Lord Brooke	Henry Richard Greville; 1779–1853; 3rd Earl of Warwick, 3rd Earl Brooke, 10th Baron Brooke	William Edwardes; 1777–1852; 2nd Baron Kensington
George Guy Greville; 1818–1893; 4th Earl of Warwick, 4th Earl Brooke, 11th Baron Brooke	William Edwardes; 1801–1872; 3rd Baron Kensington
Baron Kensington, of Kensington in the County of Middlesex (United Kingdom)
Francis Richard Charles Greville; 1853–1924; 5th Earl of Warwick, 5th Earl Brooke, 12th Baron Brooke	William Edwardes; 1835–1896; 4th/1st (Ire/UK) Baron Kensington
Leopold Guy Francis Maynard Greville; 1882–1928; 6th Earl of Warwick, 6th Earl Brooke, 13th Baron Brooke	William Edwardes; 1868–1900; 5th/2nd (Ire/UK) Baron Kensington	Hugh Edwardes; 1873–1938; 6th/3rd (Ire/UK) Baron Kensington
Charles Guy Fulke Greville; 1911–1984; 7th Earl of Warwick, 7th Earl Brooke, 14th Baron Brooke	William Edwardes; 1904–1981; 7th/4th (Ire/UK) Baron Kensington	Hugh Owen Edwardes; 1905–1937
David Robin Francis Guy Greville; 1934–1996; 8th Earl of Warwick, 8th Earl Brooke, 15th Baron Brooke	Hugh Ivor Edwardes; 1933–2018; 8th/5th (Ire/UK) Baron Kensington
Guy David Greville b. 1957; 9th Earl of Warwick, 9th Earl Brooke, 16th Baron Brooke	William Owen Alexander Edwardes b. 1964; 9th/6th (Ire/UK) Baron Kensington
Charles Fulke Chester Greville b. 1982 styled Lord Brooke	William Francis Ivor Edwardes b. 1993
Heir apparent to the earldom of Warwick and the earldom of Brooke	Heir apparent to the baronies of Kensington

Peerage of Great Britain
Preceded by Leopold Greville	Earl Brooke; Earl of Warwick; 1928–1984	Succeeded by David Robin Francis Guy Greville
