= Kerry Taylor =

Kerry Taylor may refer to:

- Kerry Taylor (baseball) (born 1971), Major League Baseball pitcher
- Kerry Taylor (American football) (born 1989)
- Kerry Taylor (businesswoman), British auctioneer
