= Bhicoo Batlivala =

Indian barrister, activist (1910–1983)

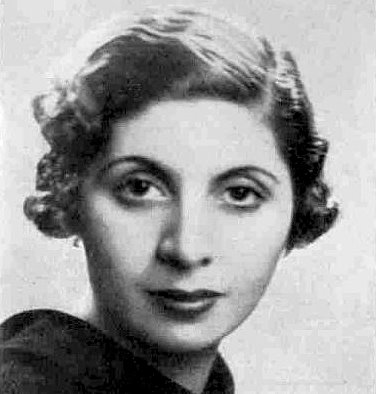
- Batlivala in 1938
- Born: 13 October 1910; Bombay, British India
- Died: 10 October 1983 (aged 72); Burgess Hill, West Sussex, England
- Other names: Bee Mansell; Mrs. Guy Mansell
- Education: Cheltenham Ladies College
- Occupation: Barrister
- Known for: Called to the Bar aged 21 (1932); First female appointed to Baroda State service (1935); Campaigner for India's independence; Campaigning for the release of Mahatma Gandhi and Jawaharlal Nehru from prison (1940s); Founding Cobham Hall School (1962)
- Spouse: Guy Robinson Mansell (m. 1939)
- Children: 2

Bhicoo Batlivala (13 October 1910 – 10 October 1983), also known as Mrs. Guy Mansell or Bee Mansell, was an Indian-born British barrister and campaigner for India's independence.

Batlivala first appeared in the 1930s as a popular socialite and photographs of her appeared in several magazines including Tatler and The Sketch. In 1935, after she had practised as a barrister at the Inner Temple, the Maharaja of Baroda in Gujarat appointed her as the first female to work for its State service, in which she became an advocate for the education of women. For a short while, she was personal secretary to Jawaharlal Nehru during his European tour of 1938. She would later campaign for the release from prison of both Nehru and Mahatma Gandhi, and at one time led a delegation of Indian women into the House of Commons to speak to women MPs there. Her earlier tour of the United States, to talk about India, gave British government intelligence significant concern.

In 1962, after settling in Cobham with her family, she founded Cobham Hall School.

== Early life and education ==
Bhicoo Batlivala was born in Bombay (now Mumbai), to Sorabji Batlivala, a successful Parsi wool mill owner who later managed Empress Mills in Nagpur. Her date of birth is recorded as 13 October 1910 in the 1939 England and Wales Register. She had a sister, Siloo, and a brother, Homi. Nowroji Saklatwala was her uncle. Her friends affectionately referred to her as "Bee". As a child, she was sent to study in England. There she attended Cheltenham Ladies College in Gloucestershire, when Lilian Faithfull was head. She later studied law. She passed her exams in constitutional law and history in 1930 with a first class mark. In 1932, at the age of 21, she was called to the Bar.

== Career ==
Batlivala worked for a few years as a barrister at the Inner Temple before the Maharaja of Baroda in Gujarat, India, appointed her as the first female to work for his State service in 1935. There, she assisted the education minister in matters relating to the education of women.

In 1938, after her engagement to Guy Robinson Mansell in England, she made another trip to India, this time to study the Congress movement, in preparation for a future lecture tour of the United States. After spending time at Anand Bhavan, she returned to England via Europe, accompanying Jawaharlal Nehru as his personal secretary. She would later campaign for his release from prison during the Second World War. In 1938–39, she delivered the Crichton Club lecture entitled "Influence of the West on Ancient Indian Culture".

=== United States tour 1939–40 ===
British government intelligence became concerned after noting that she regularly attended meetings of the India League and had planned a US tour. She departed Southampton for New York on 19 December 1939 on the Holland America Line's SS Volendam. While in the US, her views on British rule were criticised by the prominent opponent of Indian independence Katherine Mayo. In 1940, Batlivala completed the six-month lecture tour. Other Indian women seeking to gain American support around that time included Sarojini Naidu, Vijaya Lakshmi Pandit, and Kamaladevi Chattopadhyay, who was lecturing on India at the same time. One of the schools she visited was Waterville High School, Waterville, Maine. It was reported in one newspaper that "no other speaker who has appeared at the Washington Athletic Club has carried the enchantment, the fascination, the brilliance and stimulation that 28-year-old Bhicco Batlivala does".

=== Release Nehru and Mahatma Gandhi campaigns ===
Professor of American literature Clive Bush noted that Batlivala was writing about wartime India's civil and political rights as early as 1941. In an article for International Woman Suffrage News in 1941, she questioned Britain's use of India's resources to fight Nazi threat, while simultaneously denying freedom for India. She concluded: "The Indian people have repeatedly declared that they have no quarrel with the British people, but they will no longer tolerate a system of Imperialism. If the British government declares that its fight is for the liberation of all nations then it must liberate India. The world is watching." According to intelligence reports on India League's V. K. Krishna Menon, when he was unable to attend the 1941 annual dinner of the Manchester Indian Association, he sent Batlivala in his place as he felt she would be better able to offend the Lord Mayor of Manchester when responding to his speech. It was noted in November 1941, that the India League had very few Indian members, of which Batlivala had considerable influence on its policies. For the "Release Nehru" campaign (1941), Batlivala gave evidence to H. G. Wells about the circumstances of Nehru's imprisonment in India. In response, Wells protested to Leo Amery.

On 24 February 1943, the press reported that day that Batlivala headed a group of Indian women and led them to the Central Lobby of the House of Commons to request the release of Mahatma Gandhi from prison. There they met women MPs Eleanor Rathbone, Cazalet-Keir, Reginald Sorensen and Mavis Tate. The Derby Daily Telegraph described the Indian women in "beautiful native robes", and reported that Batlivala said "We are urging that the release of Gandhi should be put before the government as a very urgent matter. It is not a question only of Hindus or of one particular community. Indians of all communities here are very deeply concerned about the present drift of the situation as it is being handled by the Government." Other newspapers that reported the delegation that day included the Dundee Evening Telegraph, the Birmingham Mail, the Staffordshire Sentinel, the Liverpool Echo, Nottingham Evening Post, among others.

== Socialite ==
Batlivala first appeared in the 1930s as a popular socialite. The Belfast Newsletter, dated 27 May 1932, described her as "dainty and slender, a peculiarly attractive feature being her pretty red-brown hair, which is bobbed and dressed in soft curls in her neck". It reported that she participated in tennis and polo tournaments (in 1933, she was photographed on a horse during a polo match at Wilmer House, Ham Common, London); it was even reported she had swapped horse riding for flying as she was frequently seen at Heston Aerodrome in west London. (Note: Other Indian aviators around at the time included Man Mohan Singh, Aspy Engineer, and her relation J. R. D. Tata.) She appeared several times in The Sketch including; dressed as Pola Negri from Passion in 1933, at the Derby Ball in the summer of 1934, and attending a polo match with the Princess of Berar in the summer of 1937. The Civil and Military Gazette featured her with the Princess of Nepal, when they helped sell tickets to Sāvitri, performed at the Playhouse Theatre for the purpose of raising funds for the Twelfth Congress for the International Alliance of Women for Suffrage and Equal Citizenship in Istanbul that was held in April 1935. Later in the summer of 1935 she appeared in Tatler photographed with Major General Nawab Khusru Jung, and was described as "a charming visitor from Bombay". In 1964, she would be mentioned in the New York Times when despite rain and muddy grounds at Ascot, "she swept through the storm in a gold-and-white sari, her hemline dragging through the mud".

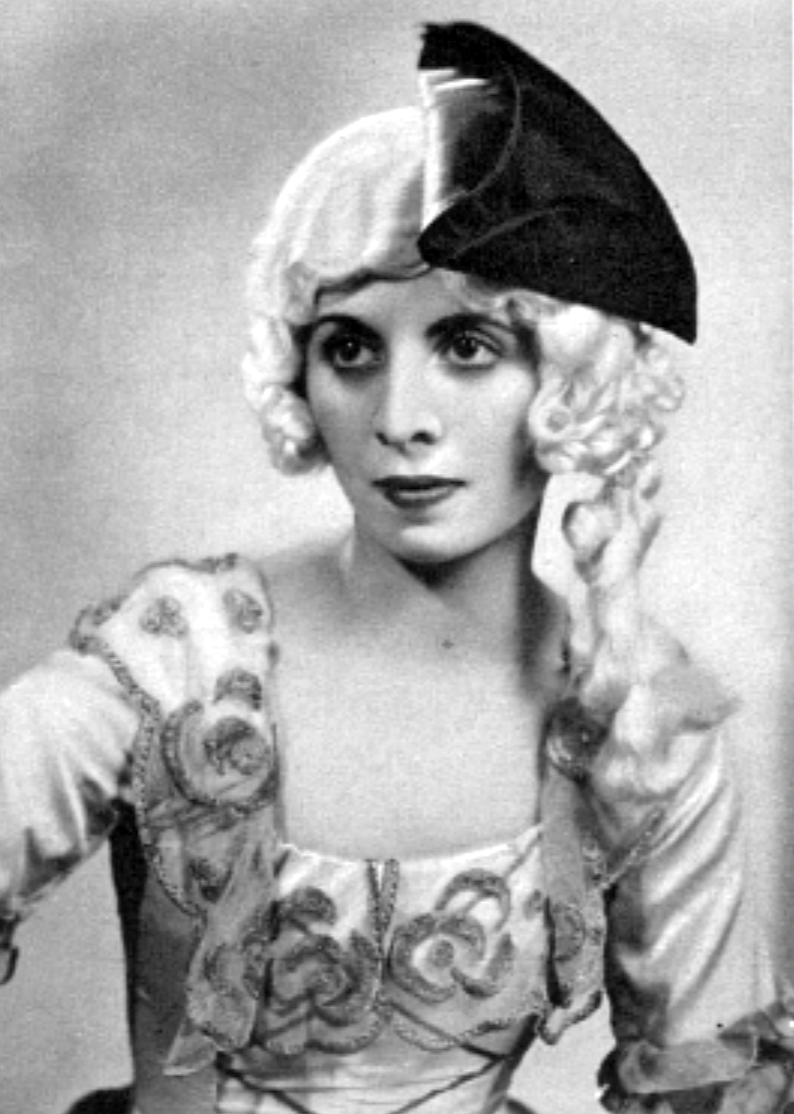
Batlivala dressed as actress Pola Negri (1933)

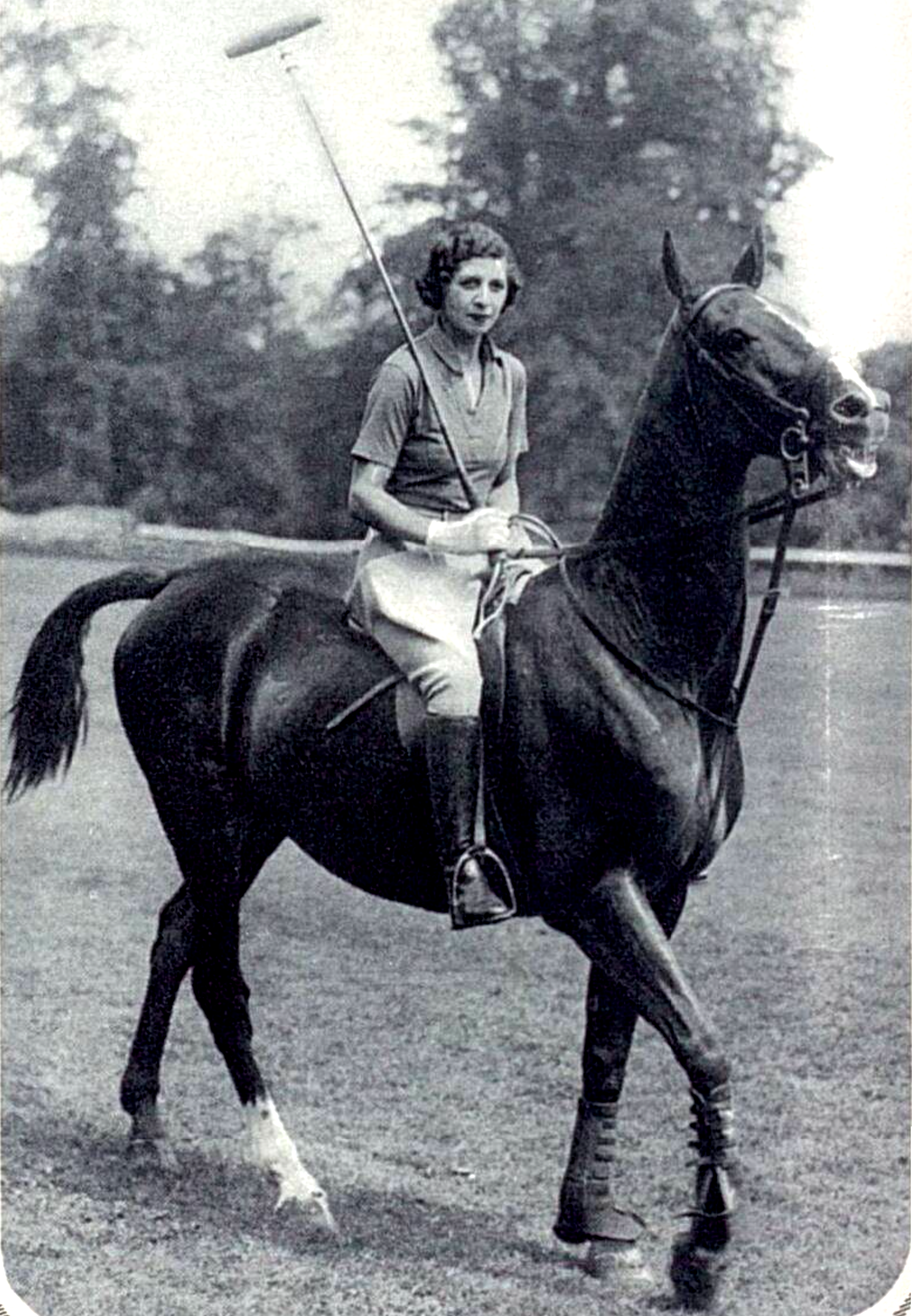
Batlivala at a polo match at Wilmer House, Ham Common, London (1935)

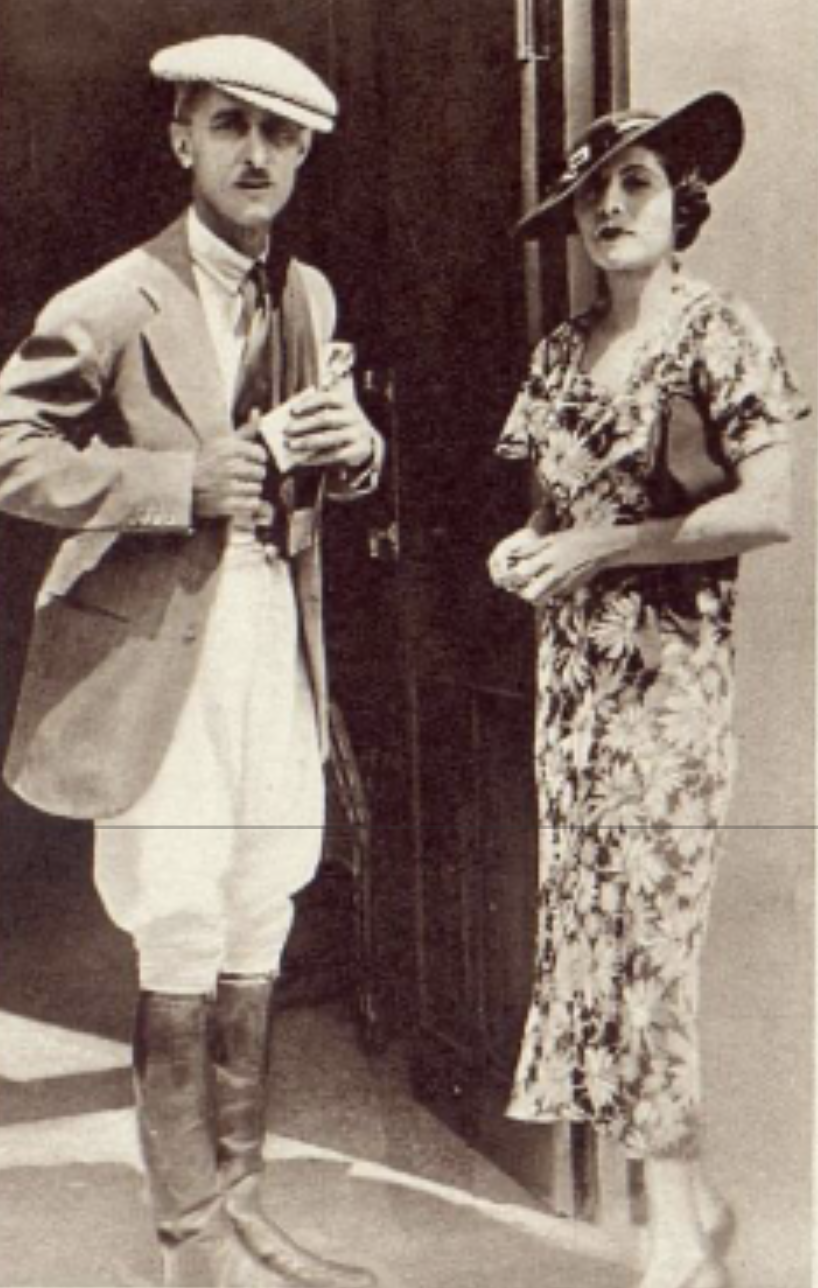
Batlivala with Nawab Khusru Jung, Major General in the Kashmir State Force. (1935)

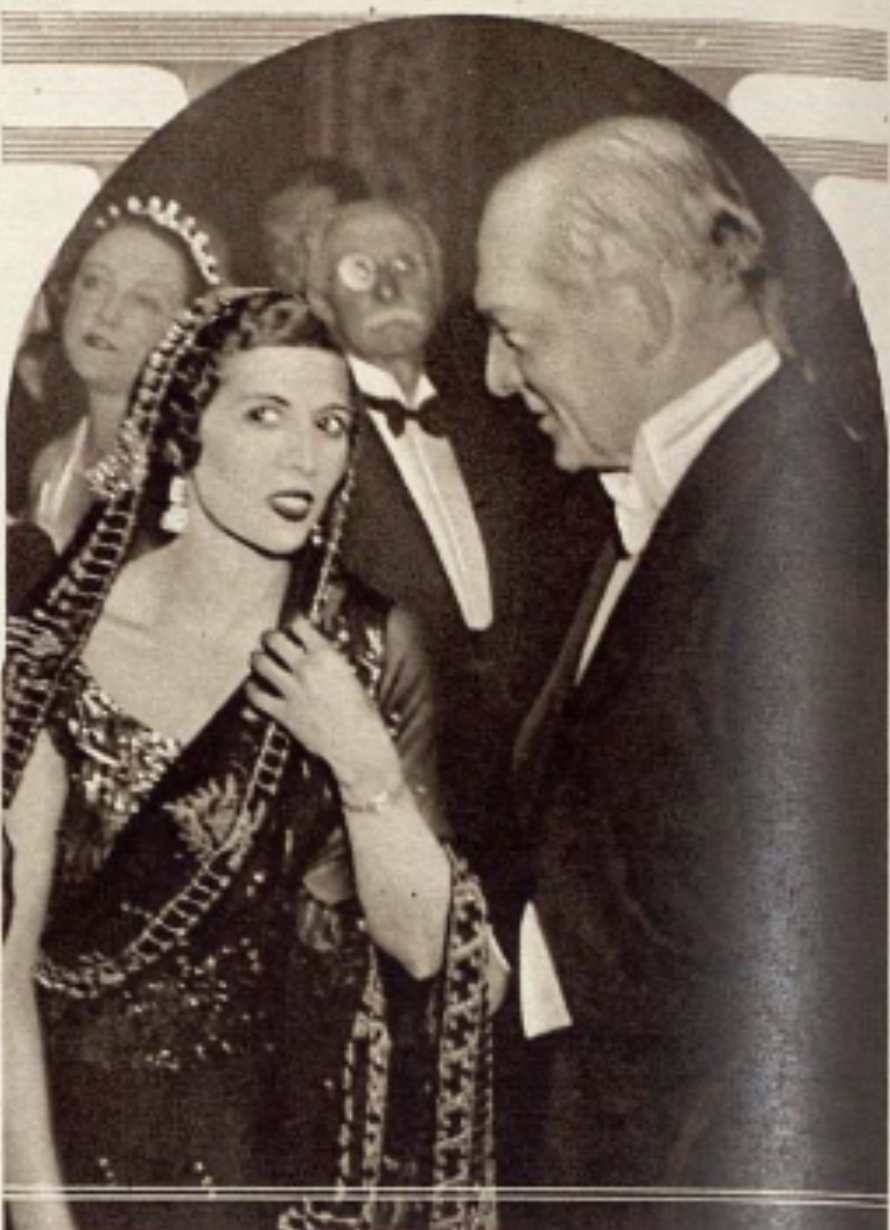
Batlivala with Sir Basil Brooke (1936)

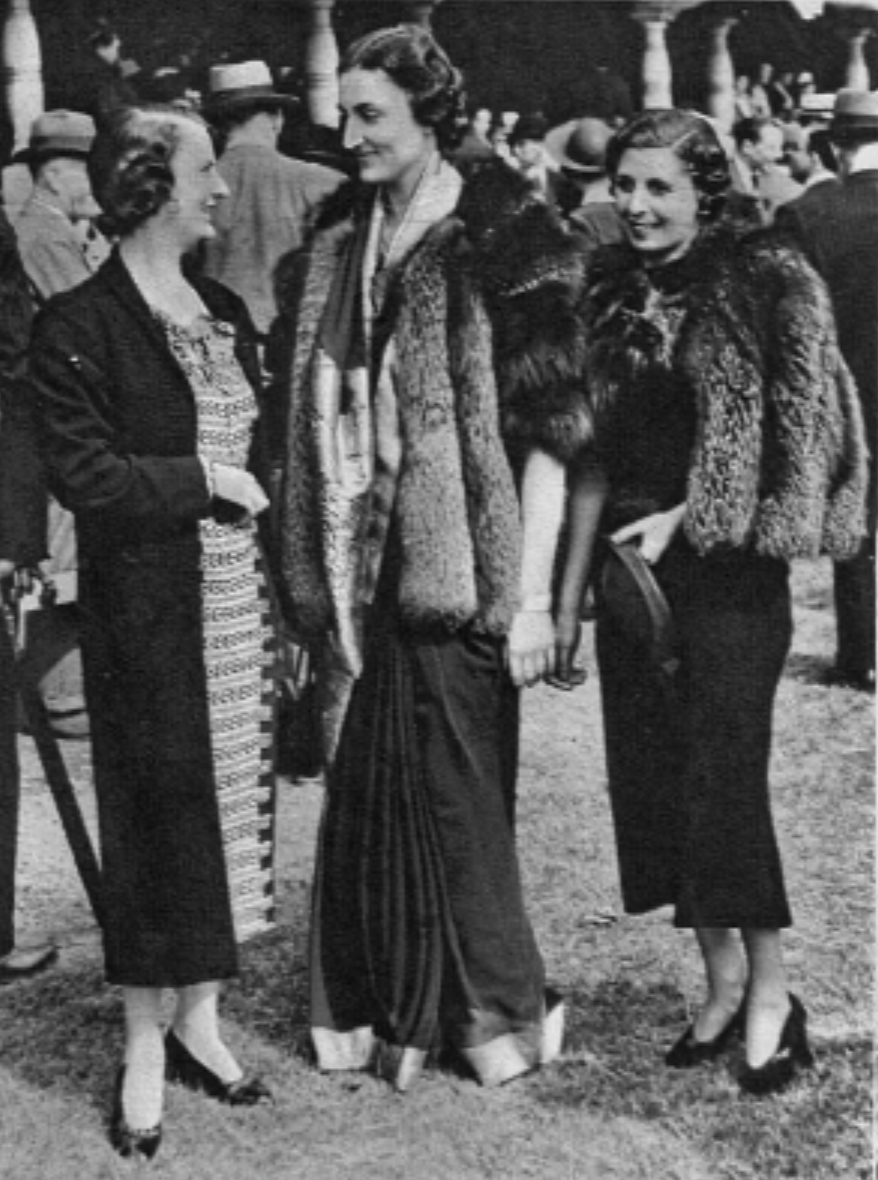
Batlivala (right) with Dürrüşehvar Sultan, Princess of Berar (middle)

== Later life ==
In 1946, she was registered as residing at Chestnut Lodge, Old Common Cobham, Cobham, Kent. (Note: It became a Grade II listed building in 1969.) In 1962, she founded Cobham Hall School. According to the founding headmistress, Brenda Hancock, Batlivala had been so deeply offended by a refusal from the then head of Cheltenham Ladies College to meet Batlivala's seven-year-old daughter that, upon a suggestion, she decided to start her own school and persuaded Pandit to be its patron. Other supporters were Sir John Rothenstein and Sir Malcolm Sargent.

== Personal and family ==
She married Guy Robinson Mansell of Upton, Buckinghamshire, in 1939. (Note: The England and Wales, Civil Registration Marriage Index, 1916–2005, records their marriage in Westminster in 1939, but spells her name 'Blicoo'.) They settled in Cobham, Surrey, and had a son, Guy, and a daughter, Edwina.

== Death ==
Batlivala died on 10 October 1983 in a nursing home at Burgess Hill, West Sussex. A memorial plaque was put up at Cobham Hall School following her death.
