= Touching Wood =

Thoroughbred racehorse

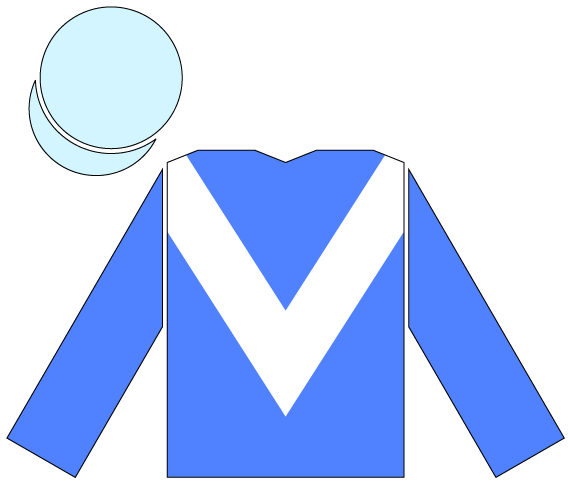
- Racing colours of Maktoum Al Maktoum
- Sire: Roberto
- Grandsire: Hail To Reason
- Dam: Mandera
- Damsire: Vaguely Noble
- Sex: Stallion
- Foaled: 11 May 1979
- Country: USA
- Colour: Brown
- Breeder: Pin Oak Stud
- Owner: Maktoum Al Maktoum
- Trainer: Harry Thomson Jones
- Record: 9-3-4-2

Major wins
- Welsh Derby (1982); St Leger Stakes (1982); Irish St. Leger (1982)

Awards
- Timeform: 91p (1981), 127 (1982)

Touching Wood (1979–2004) was an American-bred, British-trained Thoroughbred racehorse and sire best known for winning the classic St Leger Stakes in 1982. Touching Wood was still a maiden when he finished second to Golden Fleece in the 1982 Epsom Derby. In the autumn of 1982 he became the first horse in 53 years to win both the St Leger Stakes and the Irish St. Leger and was the first classic winner owned by a member of the Maktoum family. He was retired to stud and had some success as a sire of winners before his death in New Zealand in 2004.

== Background ==
Touching Wood was a small, dark brown horse bred by Pin Oak Stud in Versailles, Kentucky. He was sired by Roberto, an American-bred horse who won The Derby and the inaugural Benson and Hedges Gold Cup as a three-year-old in 1972. At stud, Roberto sired many important winners including Sunshine Forever, Real Shadai, At Talaq, Lear Fan, Kris S. and Dynaformer. Touching Wood's dam was the American mare Mandera, whose own mother Foolish One, was a half-sister of Bold Ruler. Mandera raced in Europe where she won the Princess Royal Stakes at Ascot Racecourse in 1973 before returning to the land of her birth to become a broodmare. Her other descendants include the 1000 Guineas winner Speciosa.

As a yearling, Touching Wood was sent to the Keeneland July sale where he was bought for $200,000 by Maktoum Al Maktoum and sent to race in Europe. The colt was sent into training with Harry Thomson "Tom" Jones at his Woodland stable in Newmarket, Suffolk. He was ridden in most of his races by Paul Cook and usually raced in a sheepskin noseband.

== Racing career ==
=== 1981: two-year-old season ===
Touching Wood raced only once as a two-year-old, running in the Hyperion Stakes over seven furlong at Ascot Racecourse in October. He started a 33/1 outsider in a field of eleven runners and finished third behind Paradis Terrestre. Timeform described him as being "sure to improve".

=== 1982: three-year-old season ===
In the spring of 1982, Touching Wood established himself as a fringe classic contender with two defeats in trial races. He finished second to the Henry Cecil-trained Mr Fluorocarbon in the Heathorn Stakes and second again to Peacetime in the Predominate Stakes at Goodwood.

At Epsom Downs Racecourse on 2 June Touching Wood started at odds of 40/1 for the 203rd running of the Derby. Cook positioned Touching Wood just behind the leaders, but the colt came under pressure and lost ground on the downhill section of the course. In the straight he moved up again to overtake the leader Norwick inside the final quarter mile but was immediately overtaken by Golden Fleece. Touching Wood stayed on in the closing stages to finish second by three lengths, just ahead of Silver Hawk, Persepolis and Norwick.

On his next appearance, Touching Wood recorded his first win when taking the Welsh Derby at Chepstow on 6 July from Diamond Shoal and Zilos. Later that month he finished second to the Michael Stoute-trained Electric in the Gordon Stakes at Goodwood and then finished third to Electric and Diamond Shoal in the Great Voltigeur Stakes at York.

On 11 September Touching Wood was one of a field of fifteen for the St Leger over fourteen and a half furlongs at Doncaster Racecourse. He started at odds of 7/1, with Electric starting the 7/2 favourite. Racing in blinkers, Touching Wood took the lead half a mile from the finish and held off the persistent challenge of Zilos to win by one and a half lengths, with Diamond Shoal in third and Electric unplaced. Four weeks later Touching Wood raced outside England for the first time when he was sent to the Curragh to contest the Irish St. Leger. He won the race from Father Rooney and Swiftfoot, becoming the first horse to win both the British and Irish St. Legers since Trigo in 1929.

== Assessment ==
In 1981 the independent Timeform organisation gave Touching Wood a rating of 91p, the "p" indicating that he was likely to improve. The prediction proved to be accurate as he was rated 127 in 1982.

In their book A Century of Champions, John Randall and Tony Morris rated Touching Wood an "inferior" St Leger winner.

== Stud career ==
Touching Wood was retired from racing and began his stud career at the Aston Upthorpe Stud at a fee of 7,000 guineas. In 1988 he was exported to New Zealand where he stood at the Fayette Park Stud until his death in 2004 aged 25 and was buried."The time had come, old age had caught up on him" said stud principal David Benjamin. "It was a beautiful autumn day on Wednesday so after I had spent an hour with him the vet put him to sleep and we buried him alongside our other old favourite, Grosvenor."

The best of Touching Wood's were stayers and included:,

- Ashal (out of Johara, dam-sire Exclusive Native), winner of the 1990 Ascot Gold Cup and Oleander-Rennen (3200m, Group 2, Germany).
- Golden Flare (Golden Glow, Lucifer II), winner of the Great Northern Steeplechase in 2002 and 2003 (6400m, Ellerslie).
- Great Marquess, winner of the 1991 Doncaster Cup (3600m, Group 2).
- Linesman, winner of the 1997 Sydney Cup (3200m, Group 1).
- Lucky Moon, winner of the 1990 Goodwood Cup (3200m, Group 1).

== Pedigree ==
Pedigree of Touching Wood (USA), brown horse, 1979
Sire Roberto (USA) 1969	Hail To Reason (USA); 1958	Turn-To	Royal Charger
Sire Roberto (USA) 1969	Hail To Reason (USA); 1958	Turn-To	Source Sucree
Sire Roberto (USA) 1969	Hail To Reason (USA); 1958	Nothirdchance	Blue Swords
Sire Roberto (USA) 1969	Hail To Reason (USA); 1958	Nothirdchance	Galla Colors
Sire Roberto (USA) 1969	Bramalea (USA); 1959	Nashua	Nasrullah
Sire Roberto (USA) 1969	Bramalea (USA); 1959	Nashua	Segula
Sire Roberto (USA) 1969	Bramalea (USA); 1959	Rarelea	Bull Lea
Sire Roberto (USA) 1969	Bramalea (USA); 1959	Rarelea	Bleebok
Dam Mandera (USA) 1970	Vaguely Noble (IRE); 1965	Vienna	Aureole
Dam Mandera (USA) 1970	Vaguely Noble (IRE); 1965	Vienna	Turkish Blood
Dam Mandera (USA) 1970	Vaguely Noble (IRE); 1965	Noble Lassie	Nearco
Dam Mandera (USA) 1970	Vaguely Noble (IRE); 1965	Noble Lassie	Belle Sauvage
Dam Mandera (USA) 1970	Foolish One (USA); 1957	Tom Fool	Menow
Dam Mandera (USA) 1970	Foolish One (USA); 1957	Tom Fool	Gaga
Dam Mandera (USA) 1970	Foolish One (USA); 1957	Miss Disco	Discovery
Dam Mandera (USA) 1970	Foolish One (USA); 1957	Miss Disco	Outdone (Family 8-d)
