= Ashal =

Irish-bred Thoroughbred racehorse

- Sire: Touching Wood
- Grandsire: Roberto
- Dam: Johara
- Damsire: Exclusive Native
- Sex: Stallion
- Foaled: 6 March 1986
- Country: Ireland
- Colour: Bay
- Breeder: Derrinstown Stud Ltd
- Owner: Hamdan Al Maktoum
- Trainer: Harry Thomson Jones
- Record: 11: 5-2-1
- Earnings: £121,233

Major wins
- Oleander-Rennen (1990); Ascot Gold Cup (1990)

Ashal (foaled 6 March 1986) was a British Thoroughbred racehorse and sire. He was a specialist stayer best known for his upset victory in the 1990 Ascot Gold Cup. After finishing unplaced on his only start as a two-year-old he spent the following year competing in minor races at Redcar Racecourse, winning three times. In 1990 he began his campaign by finishing second to Sadeem at Salisbury Racecourse and then won the Group Three Oleander-Rennen in Germany. At Ascot, he coped with the wet conditions better than his opponents and won the Gold Cup by four lengths. He was beaten in his three remaining races although he did finish third in the Jockey Club Cup on his final appearance. He has been described as one of the worst horses to win the Gold Cup.

== Background ==
Ashal was a bay horse with no white markings bred in Ireland by Derrinstown Stud Ltd one of the breeding companies of his owner Hamdan Al Maktoum. He was sent into training with Harry Thomson Jones at Newmarket, Suffolk. Like many of the trainer's horses, he raced in a white "sheepskin" noseband.

Ashal was from the third crop of foals sired by Touching Wood an American-bred stallion who was trained by Thomson Jones to win the St Leger for Hamdan Al Maktoum's older brother Maktoum Al Maktoum in 1982. Most of his offspring produced their best form over extended distance and included Great Marquess (Doncaster Cup) and Lucky Moon (Goodwood Cup). Ashal's dam Johara won one minor race in England as a two-year-old in 1981. She was a descendant of the American broodmare Grey Flight (foaled in 1945) who was the female-line ancestor of several major winners including Bold Lad, Quick As Lightning and Priolo

== Racing career ==
=== 1988: two-year-old season ===
On his first and only appearance as a two-year-old Ashal started a 16/1 outsider for a maiden race over seven furlongs at Yarmouth Racecourse. Ridden as in all but one of his races by Richard Hills he was always towards the rear of the field and finished eleventh of the thirteen runners behind Warrshan (later to win the Predominate Stakes and the Gordon Stakes) beaten twelve and a half lengths by the winner.

=== 1989: three-year-old season ===
Ashal's three-year-old season consisted of four races at Redcar Racecourse in Yorkshire. In 4 July he was beaten a short head by Groom Porter in a maiden over fourteen furlongs and then started 6/5 favourite for a similar event over a distance of two miles three weeks later. After taking the lead three furlongs out he went clear of the field before being eased down in the closing stages to win by two and a half lengths from Kosciosko. Ashal was then off the course until October when he contested a minor race over two miles in which only one horse, a gelding named Shrraar appeared to oppose him. Starting at the unusual odds of 1/25 he took the lead half way through the "contest" and won by thirty lengths. On 10 November the colt was matched against older horses for the first time and started at odds of 5/1 in a thirteen-runner handicap race over fourteen furlongs. Carrying a weight of 122 pounds he went to the front a quarter of a mile from the finish and "stayed on strongly" to win by six lengths from the Barry Hills-trained five-year-old Sudden Victory.

=== 1990: four-year-old season ===
Ashal began his third campaign at Salisbury Racecourse on 3 May in the Douglas Stakes, a minor race which nevertheless represented a major step up in class as he was matched against Sadeem, a seven-year-old who had won the last two runnings of the Ascot Gold Cup. Ridden by Nicky Carlisle he stayed on in the closing stages of the fourteen-furlong event and finished second by a neck to his older rival from whom he was receiving ten pounds in weight. Hills was back in the saddle sixteen days later when the colt was sent to Baden-Baden in Germany for the Group Three Oleander-Rennen over 3200 metres. He recorded his first major success as he won by three and a half lengths from Dance Spectrum with Glacial Storm (winner of the Prix de Barbeville, runner-up in the 1988 Epsom Derby) another three and a half lengths back in third.

The 1990 edition of the Gold Cup, run over two and a half miles at Royal Ascot on 21 June attracted a field of eleven runners and took place in driving rain on ground officially described as good to soft. Teamster (Sagaro Stakes, Henry II Stakes) was made favourite ahead of Sadeem and Weld (Doncaster Cup, Jockey Club Cup) with Ashal a 14/1 outsider. The international challenge consisted of Turgeon from France and Tyrone Bridge from Ireland, whilst the other British-trained runners included the Yorkshire Cup winner Mountain Kingdom. Coping well with the difficult conditions, Ashal chased the outsider Noble Savage in the early stages before going to the front before half way. He entered the final straight with a clear advantage and never looked in serious danger of defeat, being driven out by Hills to win by four lengths from Tyrone Bridge with the outsider Thethingaboutitis taking third place. Ashal's win gave Hills his first Group One success.

Much firmer ground prevailed for the rest of the season and Ashal failed to reproduce his Gold Cup form in his three subsequent races although he did carry top weight on each occasion. In the Goodwood Cup on 2 August he started second favourite but weakened in the straight and finished tailed-off behind the three-year-old Lucky Moon. He produced a better effort in the Doncaster Cup in September when he led the field until the last quarter mile but was then outpaced and finished fifth of the ten runners behind Al Maheb. In the Jockey Club Cup at Newmarket Racecourse on 6 October he briefly took the lead approaching the last half mile before finishing third behind Great Marquess and Dance Spectrum.

Ashal did not race again and there is no record of him standing as a breeding stallion.

== Assessment and awards ==
In their book A Century of Champions, based on a modified version of the Timeform system, John Randall and Tony Morris rated Ashal as the worst Gold Cup winner of the 20th century. The Independent's Sue Montgomery described Ashal's Gold Cup as a "terrible nadir" for the stayers' division.

== Pedigree ==
Pedigree of Ashal (GB), bay stallion, 1986
Sire Touching Wood (USA) 1979	Roberto (USA); 1969	Hail To Reason	Turn-To
Sire Touching Wood (USA) 1979	Roberto (USA); 1969	Hail To Reason	Nothirdchance
Sire Touching Wood (USA) 1979	Roberto (USA); 1969	Bramalea	Nashua
Sire Touching Wood (USA) 1979	Roberto (USA); 1969	Bramalea	Rarelea
Sire Touching Wood (USA) 1979	Mandera (USA); 1970	Vaguely Noble	Vienna
Sire Touching Wood (USA) 1979	Mandera (USA); 1970	Vaguely Noble	Noble Lassie
Sire Touching Wood (USA) 1979	Mandera (USA); 1970	Foolish One	Tom Fool
Sire Touching Wood (USA) 1979	Mandera (USA); 1970	Foolish One	Miss Disco
Dam Johara (USA) 1979	Exclusive Native (USA); 1965	Raise A Native	Native Dancer
Dam Johara (USA) 1979	Exclusive Native (USA); 1965	Raise A Native	Raise You
Dam Johara (USA) 1979	Exclusive Native (USA); 1965	Exclusive	Shut Out
Dam Johara (USA) 1979	Exclusive Native (USA); 1965	Exclusive	Good Example
Dam Johara (USA) 1979	Never Linger (USA); 1973	Never Bend	Nasrullah
Dam Johara (USA) 1979	Never Linger (USA); 1973	Never Bend	Lalun
Dam Johara (USA) 1979	Never Linger (USA); 1973	Quick Flight	Herbager
Dam Johara (USA) 1979	Never Linger (USA); 1973	Quick Flight	Grey Flight (Family: 5-f)
