= Oleander-Rennen =

- Class: Group 2
- Location: Berlin-Hoppegarten Racecourse; Hoppegarten, Germany
- Inaugurated: 1972
- Race type: Flat / Thoroughbred
- Sponsor: Comer Group
- Website: Baden-Baden

Race information
- Distance: 3,200 metres (2 miles)
- Surface: Turf
- Track: Left-handed
- Qualification: Four-years-old and up
- Weight: 57 kg Allowances; 1½ kg for fillies and mares 1 kg if not won €12,000 * Penalties; 3 kg for Group 1 winners * 2 kg for Group 2 winners * 1 kg for Group 3 winners * * since May 1 last year
- Purse: €70,000 (2017); 1st: €40,000

The Oleander-Rennen is a Group 2 flat horse race in Germany open to thoroughbreds aged four years or older. It is run over a distance of 3,200 metres (about 2 miles) at Hoppegarten in May.

== History ==
The event is named after Oleander, a successful German racehorse in the 1920s. It was established in 1972, and the first two runnings were won by Sarto. For a period it held Listed status.

The Oleander-Rennen was promoted to Group 3 level in 1989. It was sponsored by the fashion company Betty Barclay from 1998 to 2009, and during this time it was known as the Betty Barclay-Rennen. It was raised to Group 2 level in 2017.

The race took place at Baden-Baden prior to 2012.

== Records ==
Most successful horse (3 wins):

- Altano – 2012, 2013, 2014

Leading jockey (5 wins):

- Andrasch Starke - Flamingo Paradise (1995), Subiaco (2001), Darsalam (2005), Sound Check (2018), Aff Un Zo (2023)

Leading trainer (7 wins):

- Andreas Wöhler – Camp David (1996, 1997), Altano (2012, 2013, 2014), Wasir (2016), Red Cardinal (2017)

== Winners ==
| Year | Winner | Age | Jockey | Trainer | Time |
|---|---|---|---|---|---|
| 1972 | Sarto | 4 | Horst Horwart | Heinz Jentzsch | 3:40.30 |
| 1973 | Sarto | 5 | Fritz Drechsler | Heinz Jentzsch | 3:24.80 |
| 1974 | Sebastiano | 4 | Fritz Drechsler | Heinz Jentzsch | 3:22.50 |
| 1975 | Abendgöttin | 4 | Peter Alafi | H. Hinze | 3:23.70 |
| 1976 | Logos | 4 | Joan Pall | Heinz Jentzsch | 3:31.90 |
| 1977 | Lemon | 6 | José Orihuel | Hein Bollow | 3:24.80 |
| 1978 | Prairie Snoopy | 4 | Georg Bocskai | Bruno Schütz | 3:53.60 |
| 1979 | Donat | 4 | Georg Bocskai | Bruno Schütz | 3:27.80 |
| 1980 | Donat | 5 | Georg Bocskai | Bruno Schütz | 3:38.30 |
| 1981 | Narcissus | 5 | Lutz Mäder | Hein Bollow | 3:24.70 |
| 1982 | Seigneur | 5 | Peter Schade | Sven von Mitzlaff | 3:23.60 |
| 1983 | Kaiserstern | 5 | Karl Winkler | Oskar Langner | 4:01.80 |
| 1984 | Cynthia | 5 | Dragan Ilic | Urs Feller | 3:34.30 |
| 1985 | El Arco | 5 | Georg Bocskai | Heinz Jentzsch | 3:25.20 |
| 1986 | Ganymed | 4 | Peter Alafi | Sven von Mitzlaff | 3:45.80 |
| 1987 | Wildvogel | 4 | Trond Jörgensen | Wido Neuroth | 3:28.50 |
| 1988 | Vif-Argent | 5 | Peter Remmert | Jonathan Pease | 3:35.30 |
| 1989 | Britannia | 4 | Lutz Mäder | Bruno Schütz | 3:23.51 |
| 1990 | Ashal | 4 | Richard Hills | Harry Thomson Jones | 3:20.20 |
| 1991 | Elsurimo | 4 | Mark Rimmer | Bruno Schütz | 3:23.78 |
| 1992 | Sought Out | 4 | Mathieu Boutin | John Hammond | 3:20.05 |
| 1993 | Embarcadero | 5 | Mark Rimmer | Bruno Schütz | 3:32.57 |
| 1994 | Goracij | 4 | Lutz Mäder | Miroslav Weiss | 3:39.40 |
| 1995 | Flamingo Paradise | 4 | Andrasch Starke | Hans Blume | 3:37.48 |
| 1996 | Camp David | 6 | Peter Schiergen | Andreas Wöhler | 3:22.31 |
| 1997 | Camp David | 7 | Andreas Boschert | Andreas Wöhler | 3:23.00 |
| 1998 | Solo Mio | 4 | Cash Asmussen | John Hammond | 3:23.12 |
| 1999 | Solo Mio | 5 | Cash Asmussen | John Hammond | 3:20.00 |
| 2000 | Wins Fiction | 5 | Neil Grant | Peter Remmert | 3:32.77 |
| 2001 | Subiaco | 4 | Andrasch Starke | Andreas Schütz | 3:30.15 |
| 2002 | Adlerflieger | 5 | Andreas Boschert | Andreas Schütz | 3:29.92 |
| 2003 | Olaso | 4 | Eduardo Pedroza | Pavel Vovcenko | 3:22.91 |
| 2004 | Darasim | 6 | Joe Fanning | Mark Johnston | 3:21.59 |
| 2005 | Darsalam | 4 | Andrasch Starke | Arslangirej Savujev | 3:31.69 |
| 2006 | Bussoni | 5 | Adrie de Vries | Hans Blume | 3:28.57 |
| 2007 | Bussoni | 6 | Adrie de Vries | Hans Blume | 3:23.52 |
| 2008 | Caudillo | 5 | Jean-Pierre Carvalho | Dr Andreas Bolte | 3:20.44 |
| 2009 | Flamingo Fantasy | 4 | Andreas Suborics | Waldemar Hickst | 3:29.25 |
| 2010 | Tres Rock Danon (Note: The 2010 running took place at Krefeld) | 4 | Jiri Palik | Waldemar Hickst | 3:25.51 |
| 2011 | Tres Rock Danon | 5 | Andreas Suborics | Waldemar Hickst | 3:27.25 |
| 2012 | Altano | 6 | Rastislav Juracek | Andreas Wöhler | 3:36.80 |
| 2013 | Altano | 7 | Jozef Bojko | Andreas Wöhler | 3:21.30 |
| 2014 | Altano | 8 | Eduardo Pedroza | Andreas Wöhler | 3:30.60 |
| 2015 | Ephraim | 4 | Eugen Frank | Markus Klug | 3:44.80 |
| 2016 | Wasir | 4 | Rafael Schistl | Andreas Wöhler | 3:26.10 |
| 2017 | Red Cardinal | 5 | Eduardo Pedroza | Andreas Wöhler | 3:33.90 |
| 2018 | Sound Check (Note: Nearly Caught finished 1st but was placed 2nd after revision) | 5 | Andrasch Starke | Peter Schiergen | 3:23.59 |
| 2019 | Raa Atoll | 4 | Jozef Bojko | Luke Comer | 3:23.10 |
| 2020 | Quian (Note: The 2020 race was run in November due to the COVID-19 pandemic in Germany) | 4 | Bauyrzhan Murzabayev | Peter Schiergen | 3:46.52 |
| 2021 | Rip Van Lips | 5 | Gérald Mossé | Andreas Suborics | 3:27.69 |
| 2022 | Loft | 4 | Rene Piechulek | Marcel Weiss | 3:25.83 |
| 2023 | Aff Un Zo | 5 | Andrasch Starke | Markus Klug | 3:22.56 |
| 2024 | Alessio | 5 | Rene Piechulek | Peter Schiergen | 3:30.70 |
| 2025 | Flatten The Curve | 6 | Thore Hammer Hansen | Henk Grewe | 3:25.93 |
| 2026 | Lordano | 7 | Sibylle Vogt | Marcel Weiss | 3:26.58 |

== See also ==
- List of German flat horse races
