= Cobham Hall School =

Coordinates: 51°23′40″N 0°25′07″E

Cobham Hall
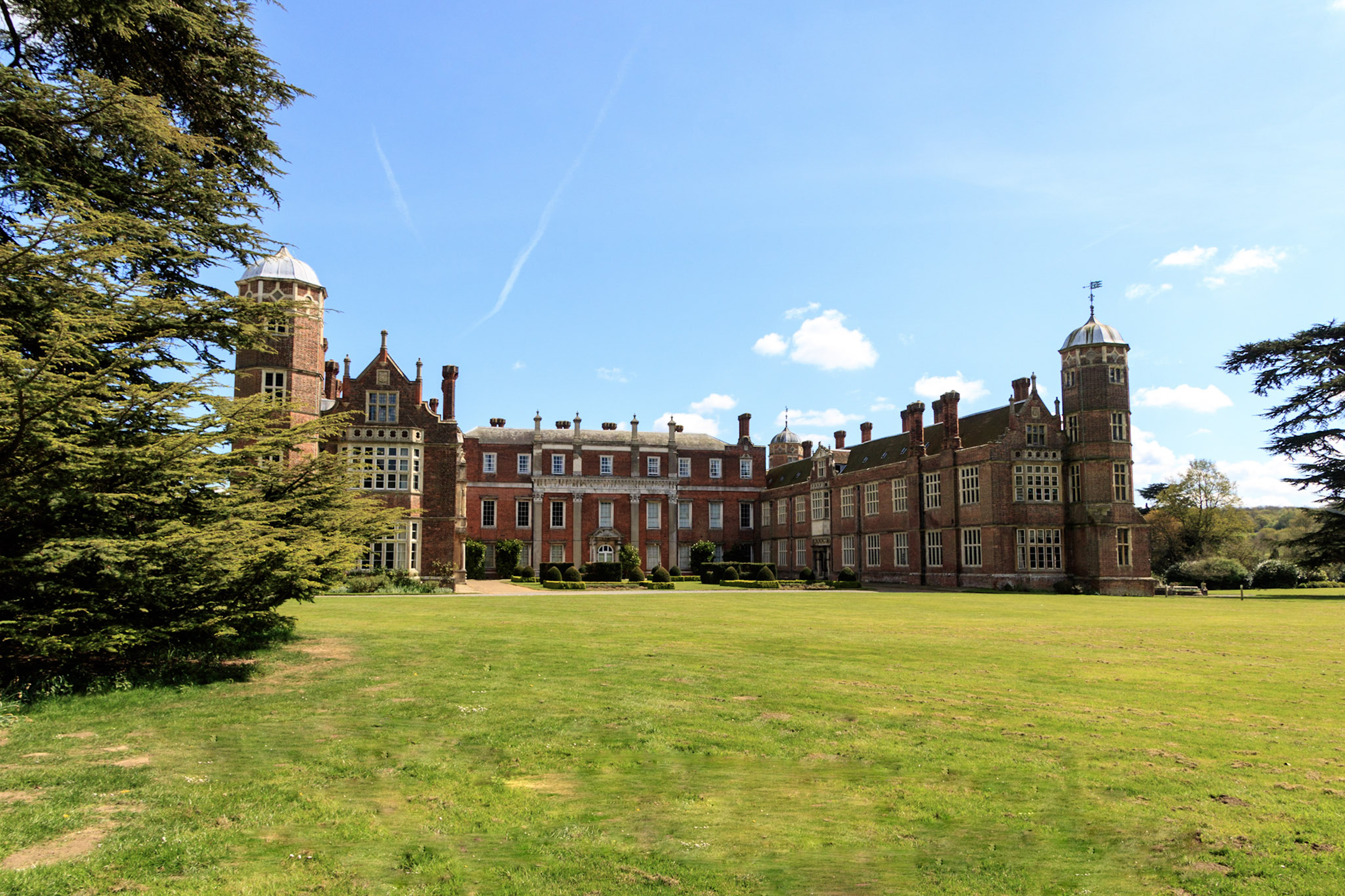
- Gravesend, Kent, DA12 3BL; England

Information
- Type: Private day and boarding school
- Motto: Plus in te est quam putas (Latin for There's more in you than you think)
- Established: 1962
- Founder: Bhicoo Batlivala
- Local authority: Kent
- Head: Douglas Brown
- Gender: Co-educational
- Age: 11 to 18
- Enrolment: 150
- Affiliations: Round Square
- Website: www.cobhamhall.com

Cobham Hall School is a private co-educational day and boarding school in the English parish of Cobham, Kent, for girls and boys aged 11-19. It is a Round Square school and a member of the Independent Schools Association. The school is housed in Cobham Hall, a Tudor era Grade I listed manor house situated in 150 acres of historic parkland on the edge of the Kent Downs. The school featured in the film Wild Child in 2008, as the fictional school that the characters attended, called Abbey Mount.

On 23 February 2021, it was announced that the school would become part of the Mill Hill School Foundation.

== School ==
Cobham Hall was founded as an international boarding school for girls aged between eleven and eighteen by Bhicoo Batlivala in 1962. The school now accepts both day and boarding students. Since September 2022, Cobham Hall has also accepted boys into its Sixth Form, and has been fully co-educational since 2025. Approximately one-third of students are boarders, both UK and international; some 25 nationalities are represented.

== Curriculum ==
Students in Years 7 to 9 broadly follow the English National Curriculum alongside a skills-based development programme. Students in Middle School (up to Year 11) follow the GCSE curriculum. In the Sixth Form, A Levels are studied as part of a broad curriculum which also encompasses the Extended Project Qualification, Global Critical Thinking, The Duke of Edinburgh's Award or Service, Sport, and a Tutorial programme to support students through the university application process. The school has a specialist EFL Department, as well as a CReSTeD accredited Student Support Department.

The school also offers a range of tailored programmes for international students, including a Pre-A Level Course known as the Foundation Programme. Intensive English Support programmes are available for those whose first language is not English.

== The building ==
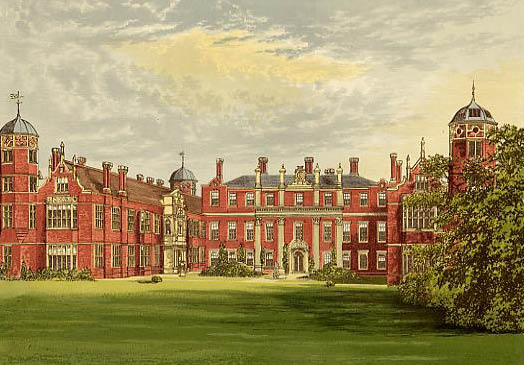
Cobham Hall, circa 1880

There has been a manor house on the site since the 12th century. The current building consists of a pair of 16th-century Tudor wings and a later classical central block, the 'Cross Wing'. Alterations were made by Sir William Chambers, c. 1767–70 The most notable feature of the interior is the two-storey Gilt Hall, c, 1770–81. The fourth earl of Darnley, who inherited in 1781, employed the architect James Wyatt extensively. The landscape designer Humphry Repton was hired to draw up a plan for the estate and two of his sons designed features of the building.

Cobham Hall remained the family home of the Earls of Darnley until 1957 and is now home to the school. As of 2014 it was open to the public on a limited number of days each year.

The building has been used as a film set. A scene in Agent Cody Banks 2 in which Frankie Muniz fights Keith Allen in a room full of priceless treasures was filmed in the Gilt Hall. Scenes from an adaption of Bleak House were filmed outside the building, and it was used in a few scenes in the comedy sketch show Tittybangbang. The Hall is used as the school 'Abbey Mount' in the 2008 film Wild Child starring Emma Roberts and as the Foundling Hospital in the CBBC adaptation of Hetty Feather.

== Notable alumnae ==
- Francesca Amfitheatrof, jewelry designer
- Princess Antonia, Duchess of Wellington
- Alex Crawford, journalist
- Catherine Fall, Baroness Fall, British political advisor
- Kate French, modern pentathlete
- Olivia Graham, Bishop of Reading
- Annabel Heseltine, journalist and broadcaster
- Mishal Husain, news presenter
- Annabelle Neilson, socialite
- Jane Percy, Duchess of Northumberland
- Romina Power, American-Italian singer
- Anjali Rao, television news presenter
- Isabel dos Santos, daughter of the former President of Angola and billionaire businesswoman
- Mary Ann Sieghart, journalist
