= David Greville, 8th Earl of Warwick =

British peer and landowner (1934–1996)

The Right Honourable The Earl of Warwick
- Born: David Robin Francis Guy Greville; 15 May 1934; Warwick, Warwickshire, England
- Died: 20 January 1996 (aged 61); Torremolinos, Andalusia, Spain
- Other name: Brookie
- Education: Mons Officer Cadet School
- Occupations: Peer, landowner
- Spouse: Sarah Chester Beatty (m. 1956; div. 1967)
- Children: 2, including Guy Greville, 9th Earl of Warwick
- Parents: Charles Greville, 7th Earl of Warwick (father); Rose Bingham (mother)
- Relatives: Annabelle Neilson (niece)
- Military career
- Rank: Second Lieutenant
- Units: Life Guards; Warwickshire Yeomanry

David Robin Francis Guy Greville, 8th Earl of Warwick, 8th Earl Brooke (15 May 1934 – 20 January 1996) was a British peer and landowner. He was the last private owner of the Greville family seat at Warwick Castle.

Greville was known as Earl Brooke before he succeeded his father. He was a member of the House of Lords from 1984 until his death.

== Early life ==
David Robin Francis Guy Greville was born at Warwick Castle in Warwick, Warwickshire, England on 15 May 1934, as the only child to Charles Greville, 7th Earl of Warwick and his first wife, Rose Greville, Countess of Warwick (née Bingham). His parents divorced in 1938, when he was four years old, and custody was awarded to his father.

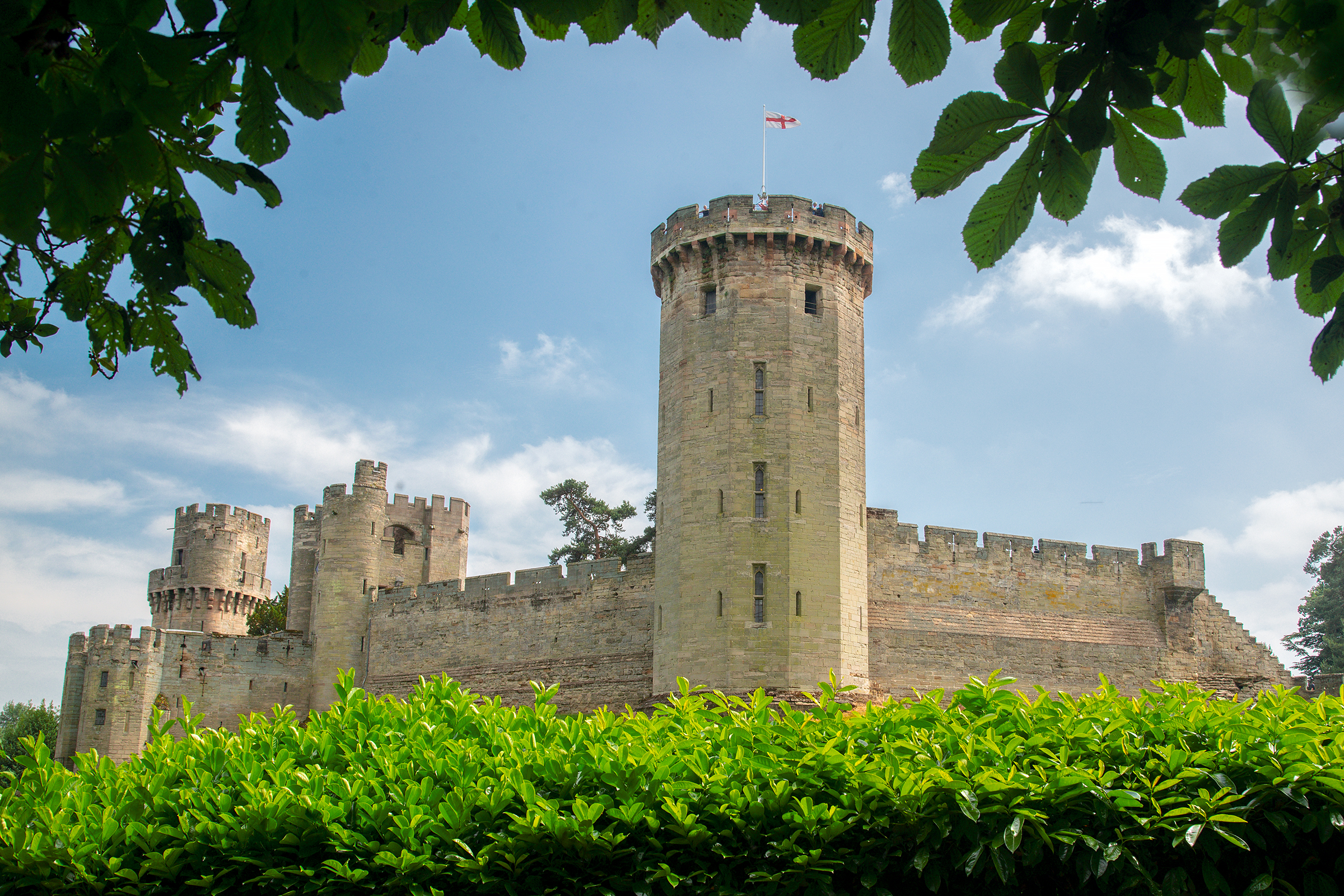
Warwick Castle, his birthplace

Greville's mother was the daughter of Lieutenant David Cecil Bingham. His mother was also the granddaughter of James St Clair-Erskine, 5th Earl of Rosslyn and Major-General Sir Cecil Edward Bingham, and a descendant of George Bingham, the 4th Earl of Lucan.

Greville was educated at Summerfields, St Leonards-on-Sea, in Hastings, East Sussex, and Eton College. He served his National Service as a Second Lieutenant in the Life Guards, after a period of training at the Mons Officer Cadet School. He then joined the part-time Warwickshire Yeomanry and trained as an accountant.

== Public life ==
Greville, widely known as "Brookie", through the later 1960s and 1970s, was prominent in London society. He was a lover of books, horses and parties, and was also an amateur artist.

In 1967, Greville's father transferred Warwick Castle and other estates to his son and heir, who in 1978 sold the castle to the Tussauds Group for £1.3m. It had been in the Greville family for 374 years, and its sale caused a public confrontation between him and his father.

Greville said he had acted as he had because he believed a Labour Government would confiscate the castle. To avoid further death duties, he sold the family art collection, including the Warwick Vase. He also sold several tons of family papers to Warwickshire County Council and went into tax exile, with homes at Pelican Point in the Turks and Caicos Islands, New York City, Paris, Gstaad, and Spain.

== Personal life ==
Greville married Sarah Anne Chester Beatty, a socialite and former fashion model who was the paternal granddaughter of the American mining magnate Alfred Chester Beatty (the "King of Copper"), in Chelsea, London on 28 June 1956, less than 24 hours after their engagement was announced. Later that afternoon, his father issued a statement, reading:

Because of the illness of Mr. Alfred Chester Beatty, Lord Brooke and Miss Sarah Chester Beatty were married quietly at Chelsea Register Office to-day. A small reception was held afterwards at which Mrs. Chester Beatty, Lord Warwick and Mrs Bassett (Lord Brooke's parents) and a few close family friends were present to drink the health of the bride and bridegroom before their departure on their honey-moon.

They had two children together; a son and heir, Guy Greville, 9th Earl of Warwick (born 30 January 1957), and a daughter, Lady Charlotte Anne Greville (born 6 June 1958). He filed for divorce in the London Divorce Court on 13 April 1967, after 11 years of marriage. Their divorce was finalised four months later. His niece was Annabelle Neilson, a socialite.

In 1979, Greville's daughter married Andrew Fraser, the youngest son of Simon Fraser, 15th Lord Lovat. They had two daughters together, Daisy Rosamond (born 1985) and Laura Alfreda (born 1987). On 15 March 1994, his son-in-law was killed in Tanzania by a charging buffalo. He had a grandson, Charles Fulke Chester Greville, Lord Brooke (born 1982), the heir apparent, from his son's first marriage.

=== Death ===
Greville died from pneumonia in Torremolinos, Andalusia, Spain on 20 January 1996. He was 61.

A fourth grandchild, a grandson, Rudolf Maxwell Greville, was born in 2003, from his son's second marriage.

Peerage of Great Britain
Preceded by Charles Greville	Earl Brooke; Earl of Warwick; 1984–1996	Succeeded by Guy David Greville
