= Francesca Amfitheatrof =

Japanese jewelry designer

- Born: Tokyo, Japan
- Education: Chelsea College of Arts, Central St. Martin, Royal College of Arts
- Occupation: Jewellery designer
- Years active: 1993
- Spouse: Ben Curwin

Francesca Amfitheatrof is a jewelry designer born in Japan and educated in England. She was the artistic director from 2018 until 2025 for watches and jewelry at Louis Vuitton. She was the design director of Tiffany & Company from 2013 to 2017.

== Early life ==
Francesca Amfitheatrof was born in Tokyo, Japan in 1968 and spent her childhood in New York, Rome, London, and Moscow. She is the daughter of a Russian-American father, the bureau chief of Time, and an Italian-Czech mother from Rome, a fashion publicist for Valentino and Giorgio Armani. Amfitheatrof's great-grandmother was English. She has a sister.

Amfitheatrof attended Cobham Hall School, a boarding school in England, while her parents lived in Moscow in the 1980s. At Cobham Hall, her school friends included the socialite Annabelle Neilson. She began her studies with a foundation course at Chelsea College of Arts, followed by a bachelor's degree at London's Central St. Martins and an MA at the Royal College of Art in 1993.

During her time at the Royal College of Art, Amfitheatrof met and worked with Giovanni Corvaja, who taught and mentored her to create unique alloys, like blue or elastic gold. As part of her school programme at the Royal College of Art, Amfitheatrof was selected by Alberto Alessi from the Italian housewares and kitchen utensils company Alessi, to come to Milan and work with his company.

In 1993, her first silverware collection was presented by Jay Jopling of the White Cube gallery in London. After graduating, she went to Padua, in northern Italy, to become an apprentice for Paulo Maurizi, who had previously worked with Corvaja.

== Career ==
=== Design ===
After her studies, she came back to London and launched her collection with a show presented by Jay Jopling of White Cube Gallery. The show consisted of sterling silver necklaces, gold rings and sterling silver vases.

She started selling jewelry through luxury fashion stores worldwide, such as Colette Paris, Maxfield LA, Browns London, Selfridges London, Luisa Via Roma Florence, Jeffreys New York, and Joyce Hong Kong.

In 1995, Amfitheatrof started consulting for fashion brands on designing jewelry and accessories. She worked with brands like Rifat Ozbek, Balenciaga, Alice Temperley, Chanel, Fendi, and Marni. For Marni, she launched their first eyewear collection and consulted for their accessories, including shoes and bags. For Chanel, Amfitheatrof designed all the hardware for bags, shoes, belts, and a line of silver jewelry.

She has worked for the British jeweler Asprey & Garrard.

During her time as the consultant creative director at Wedgwood in 2008, Amfitheatrof created many new tabletop and glassware collections, including their archival tea collection, which is still one of the best-selling gift items.

Following the death of Attilio Codognato in 2023, she took over creative control of the jewelry company Casa Codognato while maintaining her role as artistic director of jewelry at Louis Vuitton.

=== Art ===
In 2001 Amfitheatrof set up RS&A, a London-based contemporary artist agency with Mark Sanders and Julia Royse.

Amfitheatrof was the head curator of the Gucci Museo in Florence and curated exhibitions globally. from 2010 to 2013.

In 2010, she organized and curated the Damien Hirst exhibition "Cornucopia" at the Musée Océanographique in Monaco.

The following year, she curated and selected 23 works from the Francois Pinault Collection of Contemporary Art exhibited for the first time in Asia in a show entitled Agony and Ecstasy. This was presented at SongEun ArtSpace in Seoul, Korea. The exhibition was then followed by the first solo exhibition in Asia of the Chapman brothers in 2013, entitled The Sleep of Reason. It consisted of their contemporary works over the past two decades, which were then presented again at SongEun ArtSpace in Seoul.

In 2010, Amfitheatrof opened the Gucci Museo in Florence as Head Curator, featuring the video art titled "Amore e Morte" (2011) of American artist Bill Viola, followed by British artist Paul Fryer's "Lo Spirito Vola" (2012), then Cindy Sherman's "Early Works" (2013) exhibition, which included the photographic series "Bus Riders" and "Murder Mystery" and the short film "Dollhouse".

The last show she curated was the 2013 solo exhibition of Portuguese artist Joana Vasconcelos: Red Independent Heart (2010), Psycho (2010), Lavoisier (2011), and Hand Made (2008). All the works exhibited at the Gucci Museo were loaned by the Francois Pinault Collection.

=== Tiffany & Co. ===
After five years of searching for a design director, Tiffany & Co. appointed Amfitheatrof. She became the first-ever female design director in 2014. Her first collection, Tiffany T, was launched exactly a year after her arrival. She designed a range of minimalist necklaces, cuffs, and rings meant for layering and daily wear, and also created the advertising campaign, which was shot by Craig McDean, styled by Karl Templer and featured Freja Beha Erichsen. This was followed by the collections "Victoria Bows & Infinity" (2015), "Return to Love" (2016), "1837" (2017), "Collectibles" (2017), "Sweet Nothings" (2017).

During her three and a half years as the head design director, she approved the repositioning of the Haute Joaillerie for the Tiffany Blue Book Collection, that comprised 250 unique pieces. The collections were titled "The Art of the Sea" (2015), "The Art of Transformation" (2016), and "The Art of the Wild" (2017). Amfitheatrof elevated Tiffany & Co.'s position in Haute Joaillerie.

Amfitheatrof's Tiffany pieces were also recognized on the red carpet for award season. Cate Blanchett's turquoise beaded necklace for the 87th Academy Awards and diamond drop earrings for the 88th Academy Awards were highly publicized. In the 89th Academy Awards, both Emma Stone and Jessica Biel wore Amfitheatrof's "Whispers of the Rainforest" jewelry. Reese Witherspoon and Jennifer Garner are fans of Amfitheatrof's Tiffany designs as well.

Amfitheatrof created a partnership between Tiffany and Dover Street Market. This collection, named "Out of Retirement" (2015), marked the first time Dover Street Market launched and supported a project of this magnitude across all their locations and markets.

The "Out of Retirement" collection was inspired by the Tiffany archives. Amfitheatrof also designed the three installations in each Dover Street Market location, inspired by Gene Moore.

Amfitheatrof was responsible for all of Tiffany's categories. These included small leather goods and watches. She launched the Half-moon SLG Collection with wave-embossed leather and gold-plated solid brass hardware. She is also responsible for the design of the East-West Automatic watch collection, featuring a dial turned 90 degrees.

In May 2017, she worked on the Gold, Silver, and Leather Tiffany HardWear Jewelry Collection. This collection features Lady Gaga in the advertising campaign.

=== Pauer ===
In March 2019, Amfitheatrof launched her line, originally under the name Thief & Heist, and then rebranded in 2022 to Pauer, a new drop-driven, direct-to-consumer collection. In it, she brought back the tag bracelet launched in the late 1990s and amassed a large following. Twenty years later, she reintroduced it again in a collaboration with Seventeen, a South Korean band. The tag is made using partly reground nylon and recycled silver. She also launched the Codebreaker Collection, a modern take on the charms and ID. Using a patent pending mechanism to customize letters, symbols and studs in sterling silver under the banner The Metal is the Message, customers can customize and personalize their pieces using universal charms called Brix to create and design their pieces. The collection is made using 100% recycled silver and packaging made of ground pulp.

=== Louis Vuitton ===
Amfitheatrof became the artistic director of jewelry and watches at Louis Vuitton in April 2018.

Her first Louis Vuitton Fine Jewelry Collection, B Blossom, debuted in late 2018, featuring a reinterpretation of the Monogram Flower, created by Georges Vuitton in 1896.

In July 2019, she designed the Riders of the Knights High Jewelry Collection, inspired by medieval heroines.

The LV Volt Fine Jewelry Collection was introduced in 2020, followed by Amfitheatrof's second Louis Vuitton High Jewelry Collection, Stellar Times.

In July 2021, she celebrated the 200th anniversary of the birth of Louis Vuitton with the Bravery High Jewelry Collection — 90 pieces that retrace the destiny of Louis Vuitton.

In July 2022 the Louis Vuitton Spirit High Jewelry Collection was launched, inspired by mythological creatures.

Louis Vuitton Deep Time, her fifth High Jewelry Collection, was launched in July 2023. 170 pieces were unveiled, spanning the birth of the planet to the creation of life.

In August 2023, she expanded the Blossom Fine Jewelry Collection by introducing Ombre Blossom. The collection reinterprets the outline of the Maison's Monogram star-shaped Flower.

At the 77th British Academy Film Awards in 2024, Cate Blanchett wore a customed necklace designed by Amfitheatrof — incorporating repurposed pearls from Blanchett's 2023 BAFTA appearance, along with stones and materials from five archival pieces.

Amfitheatrof's sixth High Jewelry Collection for Louis Vuitton, Awakened Hands, Awakened Minds, debuted in June 2024. Comprising 220 pieces, it is her largest collection for the Maison to date.

Louis Vuitton and Amfitheatrof unveiled Le Damier de Louis Vuitton Fine Jewelry Collection in October 2024, celebrating the Damier motif — a repeated pattern created in 1888 by Louis and Georges Vuitton, designed to set the Maison apart.

On November 5, 2024, Amfitheatrof was named "Designer of the Year" at the UK Harper's Bazaar Women of the Year Awards, becoming the first jewelry designer to receive this honor.

At the beginning of 2025, she left Louis Vuitton.

== Personal life ==
Amfitheatrof married Ben Curwin in Kensington in 2004. They have two children. Amfitheatrof considers herself English-Italian, saying she has an "Italian spirit, but I am formed by English culture and education" and that she feels at home in London and Rome.
