= Guy Greville, 9th Earl of Warwick =

British peer (born 1957)

The Right Honourable The Earl of Warwick
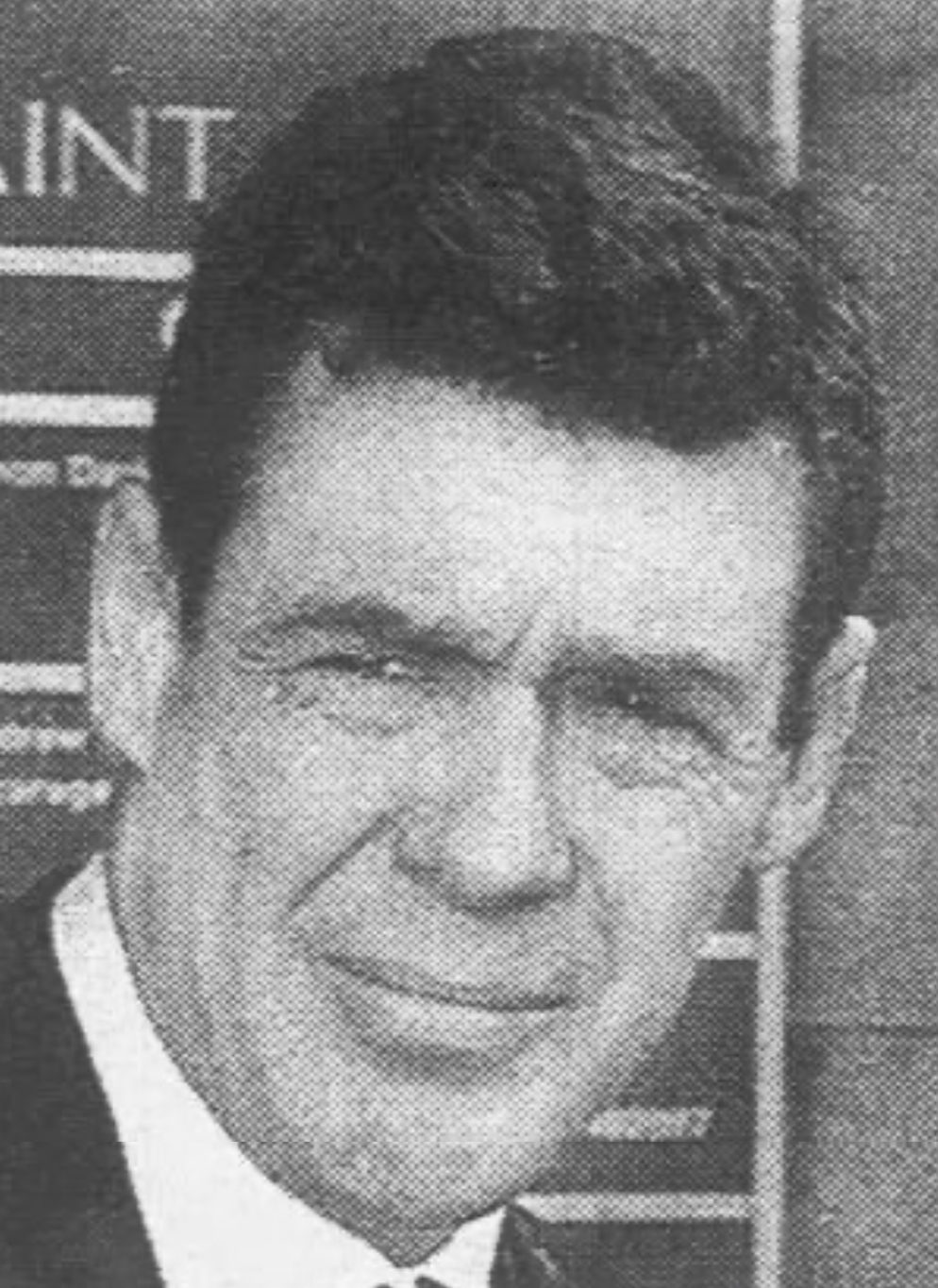
- Lord Warwick in 1997
- Born: Guy David Greville; 30 January 1957 (age 69); Marylebone, London, England
- Occupation: Peer
- Political party: Crossbench
- Spouses: Susan McKinley Cobbold (m. 1981; div. 1992) Louisa Heenan (m. 1996)
- Children: 2
- Parents: David Greville, 8th Earl of Warwick (father); Sarah Anne Chester Greville, Lady Brooke (mother)
- Relatives: Annabelle Neilson (maternal cousin); Harry Thomson Jones (stepfather)

Guy David Greville, 9th Earl of Warwick, 9th Earl Brooke (born 30 January 1957) is a British peer. He was a crossbench member of the House of Lords from 1996 to 1999.

Greville was styled as Lord Brooke from 1984. On 20 January 1996, he succeeded his father as Earl of Warwick, Earl Brooke of Warwick Castle, and Baron Brooke of Beauchamps Court.

== Early life ==
Guy David Greville was born in a nursing home in Marylebone, London, England, on 30 January 1957, as the elder child to David Greville, 8th Earl of Warwick, and his wife, Sarah Anne Chester Greville, Lady Brooke (née Beatty), a socialite and former fashion model. His younger sister is Lady Charlotte Anne Greville. His parents divorced when he was 10 years old.

Greville often enjoyed play dates at Warwick Castle with his maternal cousin, Annabelle Neilson, a socialite, during his childhood. His maternal great-grandfather was the American mining magnate Alfred Chester Beatty (the "King of Copper"). His paternal grandfather was Charles Greville, 7th Earl of Warwick. When he was 14, his mother married the Polish prince and architect Kasimir Korybut, divorcing three years later. When he was 18, his mother married her third husband, the racehorse trainer Harry Thomson Jones. He gained a stepsister and two stepbrothers.

Lord Warwick was educated at Eton College and the École des Roches in France.

== Career ==
Lord Warwick made a career in mining and property in Australia, where he was a founding shareholder in Windimurra Vanadium, serving as a director of the company from 1991 to 2009.

Warwick was chairman of Central Asia Resources from 2008 to 2013.

== Personal life ==
In 1979, the future Lord Warwick's sister married Andrew Fraser, the youngest son of the 15th Lord Lovat. They had two daughters together, Daisy Rosamond (born 1985) and Laura Alfreda (born 1987). On 15 March 1994, his brother-in-law was killed in Tanzania by a charging buffalo.

Lord Warwick married his first wife, Susan McKinley "Susie" Cobbold (née Wilson), daughter of George William McKinley Wilson, of Melbourne, Australia, in 1981. Cobbold is 11 years his senior. Their only child, a son and the heir apparent, Charles Fulke Chester Greville, Lord Brooke, was born in Perth, Western Australia, on 27 July 1982. Upon this marriage, he gained two stepchildren from his wife's former marriage to Nicholas Sydney Cobbold. The couple later separated and their divorce was finalised in 1992.

Warwick married his second wife, Louisa Heenan, daughter of Dr Peter Heenan, of Perth, in Westminster, Greater London, on 2 December 1996. Heenan is nine years his junior. Their only child, a son, Rudolf Maxwell Guy Greville, was born in Perth on 7 December 2003.

On 9 July 2014, portraits that used to hang on the walls of Warwick Castle were sold as part of an auction of Old Masters at Sotheby's. The artworks, estimated to be worth in excess of £5M, were owned by Lord Warwick. His father had sold Warwick Castle and many of its contents to The Tussauds Group in 1978, reportedly as a 99-year lease. The castle was then converted from private residence (although open to the public) to a major visitor attraction.
