= Clive Bush =

British writer

- Known for: Professor, Emeritus
- Website: www.clivebush.co.uk

Clive Bush is a British writer and emeritus professor of American literature at King's College, London, where he was head of its English department. He is the author of several books relating to 19th- and 20th-century American history, arts and philosophy, and has produced five poetry books.

== Selected works ==
- Halfway to Revolution: Investigation and Crisis in the Work of Henry Adams, William James and Gertrude Stein. Yale University Press. 1991. ISBN 978-0-300-04729-5.
- The Century's Midnight: Dissenting European and American Writers in the Era of the Second World War. Peter Lang. 2010. ISBN 978-1-906165-25-3.
