= Harry Thomson Jones =

English racehorse trainer (1925–2007)

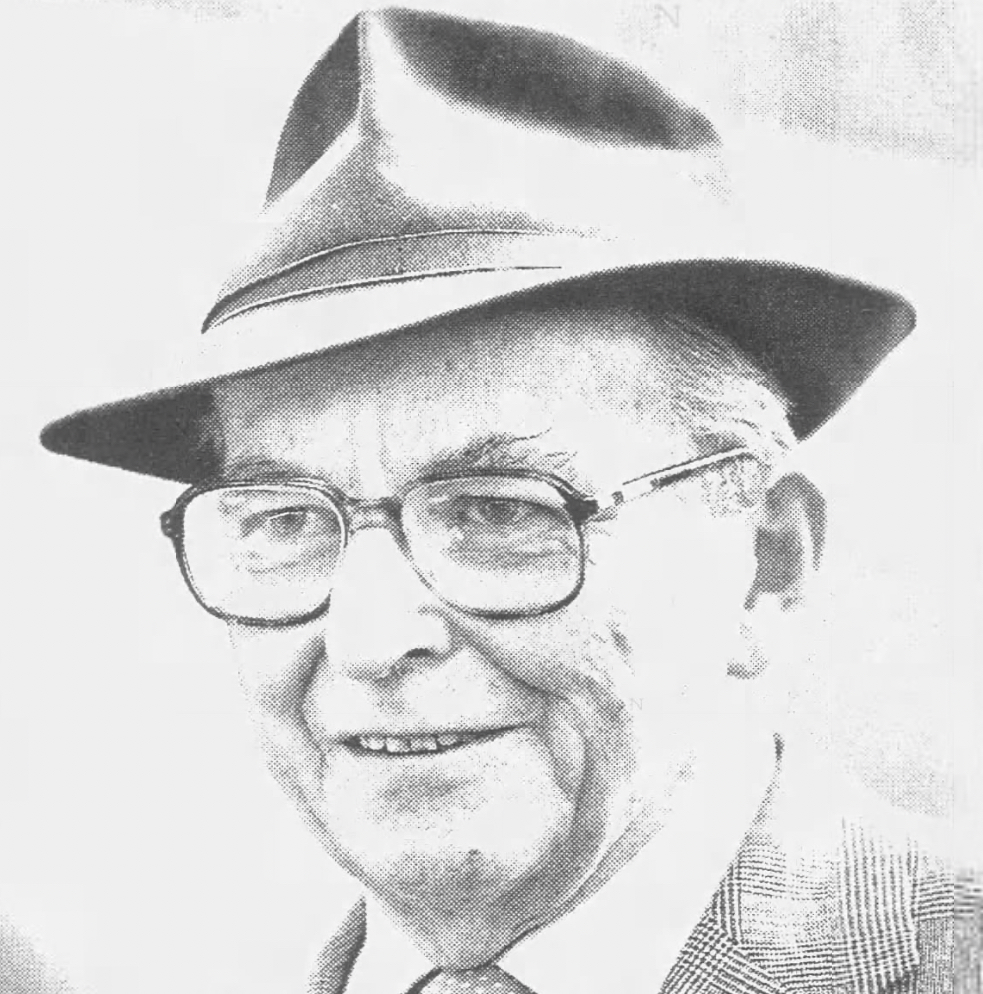
- Jones in 1996
- Born: Harry Thomson Jones; 28 April 1925; Amesbury, Wiltshire, England
- Died: 5 December 2007 (aged 82); Corsham, Wiltshire, England
- Other names: Tom Jones; H. Thomson Jones
- Occupation: Racehorse trainer
- Years active: 1951–1996
- Spouses: Solna Joel (m. 1950; div. 1973) Sarah Chester Korybut (m. 1975)
- Children: 3
- Relatives: Stanhope Henry Joel (former father-in-law); Guy Greville, 9th Earl of Warwick (stepson); Annabelle Neilson (step niece)
- Family: Joel (by marriage)

Harry Thomson Jones (28 April 1925 – 5 December 2007), known as Tom Jones, was an English racehorse trainer. He was successful in National Hunt racing, training the winners of 12 Cheltenham Festival races before switching to flat racing and going on to train the winners of British Classic Races.

== Early life ==
Harry Thomson Jones was born in Amesbury, Wiltshire, England on 28 April 1925, as the only child to Lieutenant-Colonel Victor Harry Jones, a Filipino, and his wife, Emily Charlotte (née Thomson), an American. His Christening took place in Amesbury on 2 August 1925.

Jones was educated at Eton College. After graduating, he joined the British Army, serving during World War II. Upon being demobbed, he worked as an assistant to Bob Fetherstonhaugh at the Curragh.

Jones was a distant cousin of the racehorse trainer Charlie Brooks' mother.

== Career ==
Jones was first licensed as a racehorse trainer at Newmarket, Suffolk in 1951. Amongst his notable National Hunt horses were Tingle Creek, winner of 11 races and a specialist at Sandown Park Racecourse, and Frenchman's Cove, winner of the 1962 Whitbread Gold Cup and 1964 King George VI Chase.

Jones had begun to concentrate on flat racing by the 1970s and trained his first Classic winner when Athens Wood won the 1971 St. Leger. In 1982, he trained Touching Wood to win the St. Leger and Irish St. Leger for Maktoum al Maktoum, the first Classic winner owned by the Maktoum family. Sheikh Hamdan al Maktoum became his principal owner, at one stage looking after 80 horses for Sheikh Hamdan, and the most successful horse he trained for Sheikh Hamdan was Al Bahathri, winner of the Lowther Stakes in 1984 and the Irish 1,000 Guineas, Coronation Stakes and Child Stakes in 1985.

Jones' last winner came when Agdistis won at Worcester Racecourse on 12 October 1996. He retired before the end of the year.

Jones had authored a poem.

== Personal life ==
Jones and Solna Marianne Anita Joel, a racehorse owner and trainer, who was the daughter of the businessman Stanhope Henry Joel and a granddaughter of the financier Solomon Barnato "Solly" Joel, members of the Joel family, were engaged in December 1949. The couple were married at St Peter's Church, Eaton Square in Westminster, Middlesex, on 14 March 1950. Following the service, a reception was held at the Mandarin Oriental Hyde Park, London, spending their honeymoon in Monte Carlo and Bermuda. They had three children together; Diana E S "Di" Haine (née Jones; born 25 September 1951), Christopher Thomson "Chris" Jones (born January 1954) and Timothy Thomson "Tim" Jones (born 6 May 1956). The couple separated after 23 years of marriage, and on 14 December 1973, she sued him for divorce in the London Divorce Court, citing a woman named Korybut. She was granted a decree nisi on 18 December 1973, on the grounds of his adultery, and was awarded custody of their youngest son. Di and Tim later became racehorse trainers, and Chris moved to South Carolina.

Jones and Sarah Anne Chester Korybut (née Beatty), a socialite and former fashion model, who was a granddaughter of the American mining magnate Sir Alfred Chester Beatty (the "King of Copper"), were engaged in April 1974. The couple were married in Westminster, Greater London in April 1975. They spent their honeymoon in the South of France, before returning on 7 July 1975. Upon this marriage, he gained two teenage stepchildren, Guy Greville, 9th Earl of Warwick (born 1957) and Lady Charlotte Anne Greville (born 1958), from his wife's first marriage to David Greville, 8th Earl of Warwick. Through this marriage, his step niece was socialite Annabelle Neilson.

Jones died at his home, Monks Park House, in Corsham, Wiltshire], on 5 December 2007. He was 82. His funeral service took place at St Philip and St James Church, Wiltshire on 17 December 2007.
