= Kerry Taylor (businesswoman) =

British businesswomen

- Born: Cheshire, England

Kerry Taylor is a British businesswoman and London-based vintage fashion auctioneer. She created and owns the auction house Kerry Taylor Auctions, which she founded in 2003.

== Career ==
Taylor went to art college in North Wales and then worked as a receptionist at the Sotheby's outpost in Chester, England selling catalogues. She continued at Sotheby's for 20 years, working to develop a collectibles department. In 2003 she decided to set up her own auction house, specialising in fashion and textiles. Originally based in West Dulwich, the Kerry Taylor Auctions saleroom is now located in Bermondsey.

Taylor has auctioned items worn by Princess Diana, Kate Middleton, Annabelle Neilson, Amy Winehouse, Ava Gardner, Michael Jackson and others. In 2009, she auctioned off a historic collection of Audrey Hepburn clothing and jewelry. In March 2013, Taylor auctioned off 10 of Princess Diana's dresses including the gown she wore while dancing with John Travolta at the White House in 1985. Taylor sold the so-called 'Travolta' dress again in December 2019 for a hammer price of £220,000 to Historic Royal Palaces. The auction house hosts six auctions a year, including the 'Passion for Fashion' auctions which focus on rare costumes and other fine clothing.

== Personal life ==
Kerry Taylor was born in Cheshire to a father who was a farmer. Taylor grew up in North Wales. Taylor was married to Jon Baddeley, with whom she has two children. She is now married to Paul Mack, a potter.
