= Annabelle Neilson =

British socialite, fashion model, author, and television personality (1969–2018)

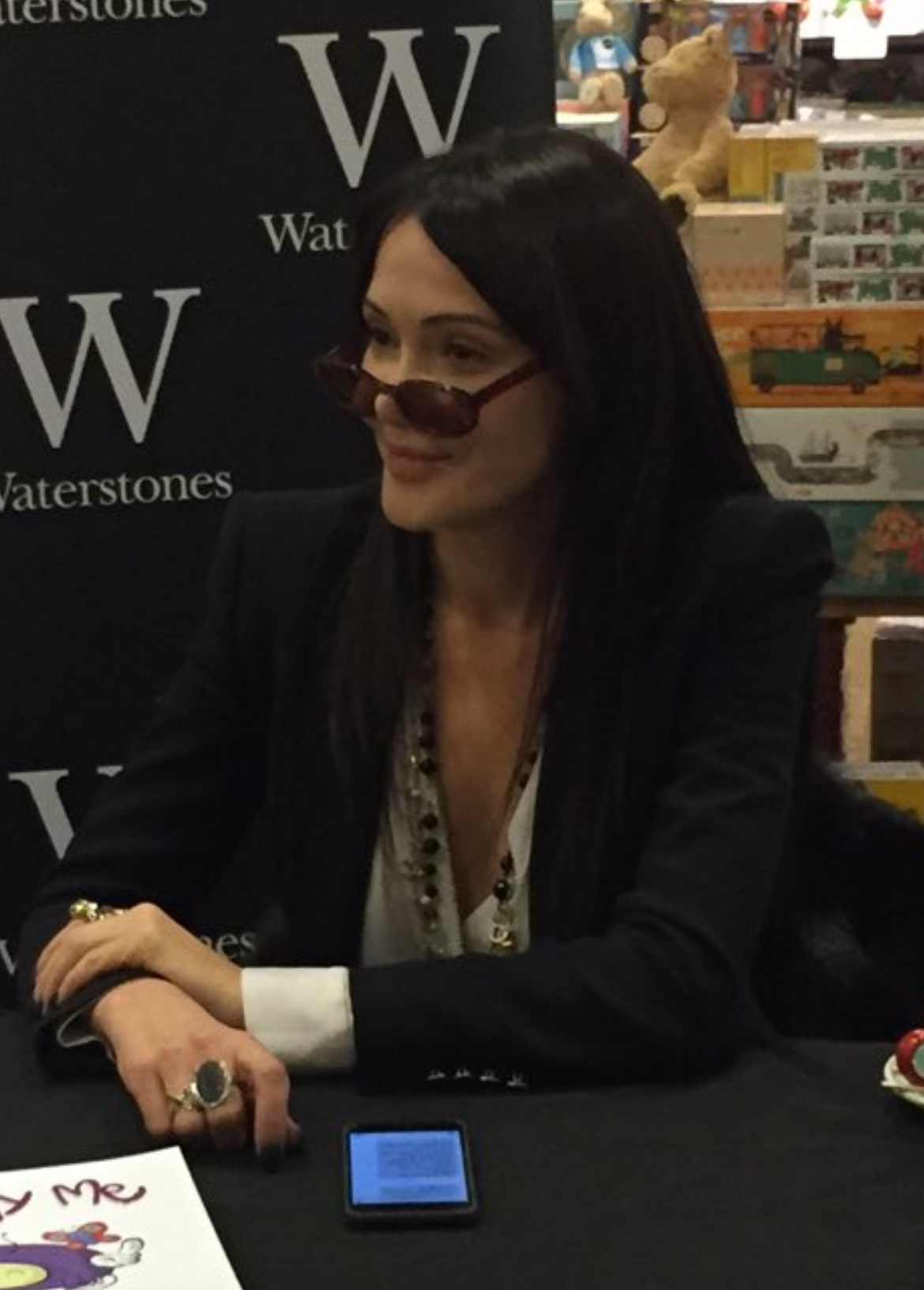
- Neilson at Waterstones, Piccadilly, in 2016
- Born: Iona Annabelle Neilson; 31 March 1969; Lambeth, Greater London, England
- Died: 12 July 2018 (aged 49); Chelsea, London, England
- Occupations: Socialite; model; author; television personality
- Years active: 1990–2018
- Spouse: Nathaniel Rothschild (m. 1995; div. 1998)
- Relatives: Guy Greville, 9th Earl of Warwick (cousin)
- Modelling information
- Height: 5 ft 6 in (1.68 m)
- Hair colour: Black
- Eye colour: Brown
- Agency: Storm Management (Jubilee Place, Chelsea, London)

Iona Annabelle Neilson (formerly Rothschild; 31 March 1969 – 12 July 2018) was a British socialite, model, author and television personality. Neilson gained media attention as the primary muse of the fashion designer Alexander McQueen. In 2014, she gained notoriety in America as a cast member of the Bravo reality television series Ladies of London (2014–2015).

Neilson died from a stroke on 12 July 2018, aged 49.

== Early life and education ==
Iona Annabelle Neilson was born into a aristocratic family at King's College Hospital in London, England, on 31 March 1969, the middle child of Max Neilson, a property advisor, and Elizabeth Neilson, an interior designer. She had an elder sister, Camila "Millie" Neilson. She split her time between her family's home in Chelsea, London, and her family's country estate, Chiltern House in the Chiltern Hills.

Neilson attended London's Lady Eden's School, where she was held back a year. At the age of eleven, she joined her sister at Cobham Hall School, a private day and boarding school, in Gravesend, Kent, where she caught up again. Her school friends included Francesca Amfitheatrof. She finished her education with no qualifications at sixteen.

=== 1985 attack in Australia ===
Neilson was randomly attacked by a man during her gap year in Perth, Western Australia, at the age of sixteen. She was tied to a tree and continuously beaten during the attack, which lasted two hours before she broke free. She received facial reconstructive surgery in the aftermath, having been left disfigured. She fell into a deep depression and became a heroin addict; she was sober by the end of her twenties. She had been travelling in Australia with her paternal cousin, Guy Greville, 9th Earl of Warwick, who owned a fruit-bottling company there. She later said her addiction saved her "because otherwise I would have killed myself". Her attacker was later convicted of killing three women.

== Career ==
=== Modelling ===
Neilson began working as a fashion model during her early twenties. At 22, she became the muse of the fashion designer Alexander McQueen, and continued so until his death in 2010. She later modelled for designer John Galliano. She walked in fashion shows for McQueen and Galliano throughout the 1990s and early 2000s.

Neilson appeared twice in the 2000 Vogue portfolio, How Many People Does It Take to Make a Dress?, where she depicted designers and their support groups. She also starred in a short advertising film for McQueen's men's collection, for which required her to be nude and simulate sexual intercourse with a male model.

In 2007, Neilson was signed to the Sarah Doukas-founded modelling agency Storm Management. That year, Neilson posed for Lee Jenkins wearing McQueen's Sarabande collection's Look 42 for the magazine's March 2007 issue, and worked recruiting business for the American businessman Carlos Almada's private members' club, Automat on Berkeley Square.

In February 2010, Neilson walked alongside models Naomi Campbell and Kate Moss in Campbell's Fashion for Relief fundraiser, at Somerset House on the Strand, London. In 2013, she walked for designer Pam Hogg's spring fashion show. In February 2015, Neilson would once again walk for Campbell's Fashion for Relief fundraiser, which supported the Disasters Emergency Committee's aid for Ebola.

=== Television ===
In 2014, Neilson made her television debut as an original cast member on the Bravo reality television series Ladies of London. The series chronicled the personal and professional lives of Neilson, along with Juliet Angus, Caprice Bourret, Marissa Hermer, Noelle Reno, and Caroline Stanbury. Upon the series' renewal for a second season, she returned to the main cast. In December 2015, she announced her departure from the show in an Instagram post. She appeared in nineteen episodes.

=== Authorship ===
Neilson was the author of the Me Me Me children's and teenage, and picture book series. The first instalment, Angry Me, was published by Fat Fox Books Ltd on 18 August 2015. The second and third instalments, Messy Me, and Dreamy Me, were both published by Fat Fox Books Ltd on 19 January 2016.

In February 2016, her autobiography, McQueen and I, was published by Virgin Books. The book focused on her life with Alexander McQueen.

== Personal life ==
Neilson met financier Nathaniel Rothschild of the Rothschild banking family while on a beach in India. The pair eloped in Las Vegas, Nevada, and married in the Dominican Republic in November 1995. They separated three years later in 1997, and divorced in 1998, with a confidentiality agreement and an out-of-court settlement.

She had been romantically linked to Lord Edward Spencer-Churchill of the Spencer-Churchill family, magazine editor Jefferson Hack, and Kettle Crisps heir Karta Healy.

Neilson was close friends with Naomi Campbell, Jude Law, Sadie Frost, and Kate Moss.

In 2013, while training for the Goodwood Racecourse's all-women's horse race, she was thrown off the saddle at 45 mph, breaking her pelvis, leaving her unable to walk for over a month, however she regained her ability to walk after twelve weeks.

Through Naomi Campbell, Neilson was involved with the South Africa-based Nelson Mandela Children's Fund. In 2015, Neilson wrote a section of the multi-authored children's book The Curious Tale of Fi-Rex!, in aid of Children in Need 2015.

=== Relationship with Alexander McQueen ===
Neilson met designer Alexander McQueen through magazine editor Isabella Blow in 1993, having no previous knowledge of him. Upon meeting at his Hoxton studio, the two bonded over their two-week-apart March 1969 birthdays. The two grew closer throughout the 90s, gifting Neilson the nickname "Tinkerbell", while she called him by his first name, Lee. In 1998, McQueen dedicated his fashion house's autumn/winter fashion show, Joan, to her. In 2000, Neilson was present when McQueen proposed to his then-boyfriend George Forsyth at the Groucho Club in London, and was a bridesmaid at McQueen's unofficial Ibiza marriage ceremony that year. Through their friendship, Neilson had a bedroom in every home McQueen owned, went on ski holidays to Cervinia, Verbier, Marbella, and Thailand, and shared a dog together named Juice.

McQueen had spent his final New Year's skiing in Val-d'Isère, France, with Neilson and two other friends. Neilson was also the last person to see McQueen alive, having left his Green Street, Mayfair home at 3:00 a.m. on 11 February 2010, the day of his suicide. At his funeral service, which was held at St Paul's Church, Knightsbridge, on 25 February 2010, she read lines from the Edgar Allan Poe poem Annabel Lee. Throughout March 2010, she paid tribute to McQueen by wearing his distinctive "manta" dress. She organised and spoke at his memorial service, held at St Paul's Cathedral on 20 September 2010.

In 2016, she published her book, McQueen and I, where she discussed her and McQueen's friendship.

=== Relationship with Jeffrey Epstein ===
Following the US Department of Justice's release in January 2026 of several million communications relating to Jeffrey Epstein, Neilson was identified as having emailed Epstein numerous times between 2010 and 2012, after his 2008 conviction for soliciting prostitution from a minor. In the emails, Neilson agreed to "put together a group of girls" for Epstein and noted that some were "unfortunately past their sell-by date". Another email from a redacted sender to an account named Annabelle Neilson on 26 January 2011 reads "Hey Annabelle, let's you and I try and find something cute for JE tonight."

Emails from Ghislaine Maxwell in August 2010 warned Epstein to "be careful" of Neilson. The Times reported that a month after that email, Neilson appeared to have organised meetings for Epstein with "women who were told they were being interviewed to become Epstein's personal assistant".

== Death ==
Neilson was found dead at her home in Chelsea, London, on the evening of 12 July 2018. She was 49. Her death was announced to the public four days later, on 16 July. The police stated it was not being treated as suspicious. A spokesperson for Westminster Coroner's Court stated that her cause of death was a "cerebrovascular accident" (stroke). Her family said her cause of death was a heart attack.

=== Aftermath ===
The fashion house, Alexander McQueen, paid tribute with lines from the Edgar Allan Poe poem Annabel Lee. The Kate Moss Agency posted a photo of Moss and Neilson to their Instagram page, with a broken heart emoji. Bravo and Andy Cohen also paid tribute to Neilson.

Neilson was buried following a private funeral service at St Paul's Church, Knightsbridge, on 27 July 2018. Both Kate Moss and Naomi Campbell gave a joint eulogy during the service. Other attendees included columnist Meg Mathews, and actors Orlando Bloom and Liv Tyler.

Neilson's archive of Alexander McQueen couture was auctioned by Kerry Taylor Auctions in London on 22 September 2020. The auction, titled "The Annabelle Neilson Collection of Alexander McQueen Auction", was predicted to raise between £120,000 and £180,000.

== Bibliography ==
- Neilson, Annabelle; Astro (2015). Angry Me. Fat Fox Books Ltd. ISBN 9780992872878.
- Neilson, Annabelle; Oliver, Jamie; Oliver, Jools; Holden, Amanda; Keating, Ronan; Grylls, Bear; Stewart, Rod; Lancaster, Penny; Rooney, Coleen; Rooney, Wayne; van Outen, Denise; Murray, Andy; Lemon, Keith; Daley, Tom; McCartney, Sir Paul; Direction, One; That, Take; Moss, Kate; Grimshaw, Nick; Minogue, Kylie (2015). The Curious Tale of Fi-Rex!. Fat Fox Books Ltd. ISBN 978-1910884003.
- Neilson, Annabelle (2016). McQueen and I. Virgin Books. ISBN 9780753555125.
- Neilson, Annabelle; Astro (2016). Messy Me. Fat Fox Books Ltd. ISBN 9781910884010.
- Neilson, Annabelle; Astro (2016). Dreamy Me. Fat Fox Books Ltd. ISBN 9781910884027.

== Filmography ==
Year	Title	Notes	Ref.
2013	Because You're Mine	Short film; Special thanks	
2014–2015	Ladies of London	Series regular; 18 episodes	
2014	This Morning	Episode: "07/10/2014"	
2015	Watch What Happens Live with Andy Cohen	Episode: "Heather Dubrow/Annabelle Neilson"	
2018	McQueen	Cameo appearance and archived footage	
