= William Neville (poet) =

British poet (1497–c.1545)

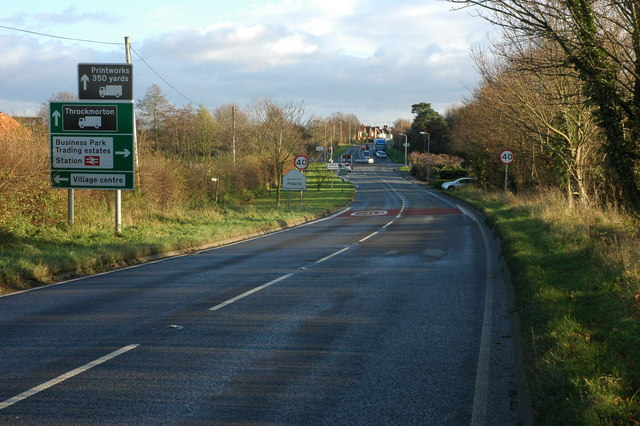
- Modern Pinvin, Worcestershire, where William Neville once resided
- Born: 15 July 1497
- Died: c. 1545 (aged 47–48)
- Noble family: House of Neville
- Spouse: Elizabeth Greville
- Issue: Richard Neville; Mary Neville; Susan Neville
- Father: Richard Neville, 2nd Baron Latimer
- Mother: Anne Stafford

William Neville (15 July 1497 – c. 1545) of Penwyn and Wyke Sapie, Worcestershire, was the son of Richard Neville, 2nd Baron Latimer, and the author of The Castell of Pleasure. In 1532 he was accused of treason and dabbling in magic.

== Family ==
William Neville, born 15 July 1497, was the second son of Richard Neville, 2nd Baron Latimer, and Anne Stafford, daughter of Sir Humphrey Stafford of Grafton, Worcestershire, and Katherine Fray (12 May 1482), the daughter of Sir John Fray, Chief Baron of the Exchequer, by Agnes Danvers (d. June 1478), the daughter of Sir John Danvers (died c.1448). William Neville had five brothers and six sisters:

- John Neville, 3rd Baron Latimer, who married first, Dorothy de Vere, daughter of Sir George Vere by Margaret Stafford, and sister and coheir of John de Vere, 14th Earl of Oxford; second, Elizabeth Musgrave; and third, Catherine Parr, later Henry VIII's sixth Queen.
- Sir Thomas Neville of Piggotts Hall in Ardleigh, Essex, who married Mary Teye, the daughter and coheir of Sir Thomas Teye, by whom he had a son, Thomas.
- Marmaduke Neville of Marks Tey, who married Elizabeth Teye, the daughter and coheir of Sir Thomas Teye, by whom he had a son, Christopher, who died young, and a daughter, Alianore, who married Thomas Teye, esquire, of Layer de la Haye, Essex.
- George Neville, Archdeacon of Carlisle, (born 29 July 1509, buried 6 September 1567 at Well, North Yorkshire).
- Christopher Neville.
- Margaret Neville (born 9 March 1495), eldest daughter, who married, by papal dispensation dated 22 November 1505, Edward Willoughby (d. November 1517) of Alcester, Warwickshire, son of Robert Willoughby, 2nd Baron Willoughby de Broke (d. 10 or 11 November 1521), by his first wife, Elizabeth Beauchamp, by whom she had three daughters, Elizabeth (buried 15 November 1562), who married Sir Fulke Greville (d. 10 November 1559), Anne (d. 1528) and Blanche (d. before 1543), who married Francis Dawtrey. Elizabeth Willoughby and Sir Fulke Greville (d. 10 November 1559) were the grandparents of the courtier and author, Fulke Greville, 1st Baron Brooke.
- Dorothy Neville, who married Sir John Dawney.
- Elizabeth Neville (born 28 April 1500), who married, before 1531, Sir Christopher Danby (c.1505 – 14 June 1571), of Farnley, North Yorkshire, only son of Sir Christopher Danby (d. 17 March 1518) and Margaret Scrope, daughter of Thomas Scrope, 5th Baron Scrope of Masham (d.1475). They had six sons, Sir Thomas Danby, Christopher Danby, John Danby, James Danby, Marmaduke Danby and William Danby, and eight daughters, Dorothy, who married Sir John Neville; Mary; Joan, who married Roger Meynell, esquire; Margaret, who married Christopher Hopton, esquire; Anne, who married Sir Walter Calverley; Elizabeth, who married Thomas Wentworth, esquire; Magdalen, who married Marmaduke Wyvill; and Margery, who married Christopher Mallory, esquire. Anne Danby and Sir Walter Calverley were the grandparents of Walter Calverley (d.1605), whose murder of his children is dramatised in A Yorkshire Tragedy, attributed on the title page to William Shakespeare. It seems likely that Anne's brother, William Danby, was the William Danby who served as coroner at the inquest into the death of Christopher Marlowe in 1593.
- Katherine Neville.
- Susan Neville (1501 – c.1560), who married the rebel Richard Norton (d. 9 April 1585), esquire, the eldest son of John Norton (d. 1557) by Anne Radcliffe (d. before 1557).
- Joan Neville.

After the death of Anne Stafford, Neville's father married, by licence dated 5 July 1502, Margaret (d. 16 December 1521), the widow of Sir James Strangways.

== Career ==
According to Edwards, Neville may have served in the household of Cardinal Wolsey in his youth. From 1524 on he was from time to time a commissioner of the peace for Worcestershire. He held lands in Worcestershire and Gloucestershire, some of which had been bequeathed to him and to his wife by her father, Sir Giles Greville. During the late 1520s and 1530s these were the subject of litigation.

In December 1532 Thomas Wood accused Neville of treason, alleging he had prophesied the King's death, and that he himself would become Earl of Warwick. In addition there were other allegations that Neville had dabbled in magic, including the claim that at one time 'he tried to make himself a cloak of invisibility of two layers of linen with one between of buckskin, the whole to be treated with a mixture in which horse bones, skin, chalk, rosin and powdered glass were the chief ingredients.' His former chaplain, Edward Legh, made similar allegations in March 1533. It appears Neville, and his brothers George and Christopher, who were also drawn into the investigation, escaped from these charges relatively unscathed. In 1534 Neville petitioned Thomas Cromwell, claiming that owing to great losses he was so impoverished that he could not afford to go to law to obtain redress of wrongs done to him.

Neville wrote The Castell of Pleasure, an allegorical work in which a dreamer, Desire, is led by Morpheus to a castle where he encounters Beauty and other allegorical personages. On waking the dreamer laments the changeableness of human affairs. The poem is prefaced and followed by verses by Robert Copland. The Castell of Pleasure is said to have been influenced by the poems of Stephen Hawes. It was published by Henry Pepwell in 1518, and by Wynkyn de Worde in about 1530.

The date of William Neville's death is unknown. By 1545 his estates were in the possession of his son, Richard.

== Marriage and issue ==
Neville married, before 1 April 1529, as her second husband, Elizabeth Greville, widow of Richard Wye of the Temple, and only daughter and heir of Sir Giles Greville (d. 1 April 1528), of Wick, Worcestershire, Comptroller of the Household to Princess Mary, and Chamberlain of South Wales, and his wife Anne Rede, the daughter of Sir William Rede of Boarstall, Buckinghamshire. William Neville and Elizabeth Greville had a son and two daughters:

- Richard Neville (d. 27 May 1590) of Penwyn (now Pinvin) and Wyke Sapie (Wick Episcopi), Worcestershire, who married Barbara Arden, the daughter of William Arden of Park Hall, Warwickshire, by Elizabeth Conway, the daughter of Edward Conway of Arrow, by whom he had a son, Edmund Neville. According to The Visitation of Warwick, Barbara Arden had two brothers, Edward Arden of Park Hall in Castle Bromwich, Warwickshire, who married Mary Throckmorton, the third daughter of Sir Robert Throckmorton, and Francis Arden of Pedmore, who married the daughter and heir of Edmund Fox of Oxford, and three sisters, Anne Arden, who married John Barnesley of Barnesley Hall in Worcestershire; Bridget Arden, who married Hugh Massey of Crosley in Cheshire; and Joyce Arden, who married John Ladbrooke. According to William Arden's will, Barbara Arden had four others sisters, Jane, Frances, and two sisters both named Ursula.
- Mary Neville
- Susan Neville.

After the death without male issue of William Neville's nephew, John Neville, 4th Baron Latimer, William Neville's son, Richard Neville (d. 27 May 1590), wrongfully assumed the title of Baron Latimer, as did Richard's son, Edmund Neville, after Richard's death.
