= Richard Neville, 2nd Baron Latimer =

English soldier & peer (c.1468–c.1530)

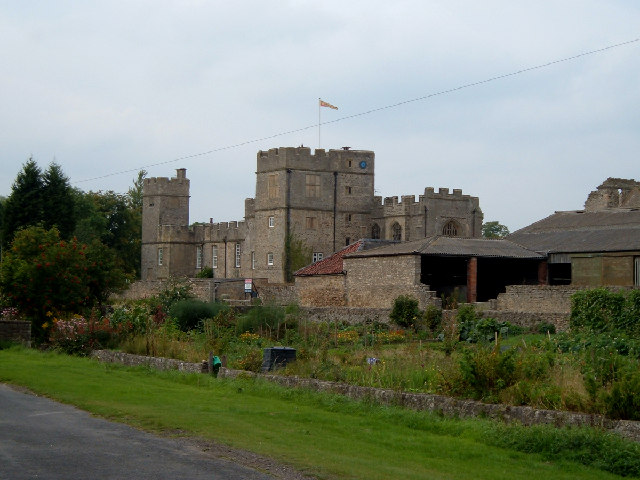
- Snape Castle, seat of the Barons Latimer
- Born: c.1468
- Died: c. 28 December 1530; Snape Castle
- Buried: Well, North Yorkshire
- Noble family: House of Neville
- Spouses: Anne Stafford; Margaret (surname unknown)
- Issue: John Neville, 3rd Baron Latimer; William Neville; Sir Thomas Neville; Marmaduke Neville; George Neville, Archdeacon of Carlisle; Christopher Neville; Margaret Neville; Dorothy Neville; Elizabeth Neville; Katherine Neville; Susan Neville; Joan Neville
- Father: Sir Henry Neville
- Mother: Joan Bourchier

Richard Neville, 2nd Baron Latimer (c.1468 – c. 28 December 1530) of Snape, North Yorkshire, was an English soldier and peer. He fought at the battles of Stoke and Flodden.

Richard Neville was the eldest son of Sir Henry Neville, who was killed on 23 July 1469 the day before the Battle of Edgcote, and Joan Bourchier (d. 7 October 1470), daughter of John Bourchier, 1st Baron Berners, by Margery, daughter and heiress of Richard Berners, esquire. He had a brother, Thomas Neville, and a sister, Joan Neville, wife of Sir James Radcliffe.

Neville's maternal grandfather, John Bourchier, 1st Baron Berners, was the fourth son of William Bourchier, 1st Count of Eu in Normandy, and his wife Anne of Gloucester, daughter of Thomas of Woodstock, youngest son of King Edward III. By her second husband, Edmund Stafford, 5th Earl of Stafford, Anne of Gloucester was the mother of Humphrey Stafford, 1st Duke of Buckingham.

On his father's side, Richard Neville was the grandson of George Neville, 1st Baron Latimer (d. 30 or 31 December 1469), and Elizabeth Beauchamp, the daughter of Richard de Beauchamp, 13th Earl of Warwick.

== Career ==
When he was only a year old, Richard Neville inherited the barony together with lands in 24 counties, including Snape Castle in Richmondshire, at the death of his grandfather, George Neville, 1st Baron Latimer, on 30 or 31 December 1469. His wardship and marriage were purchased for £1000 in May 1470 by his great uncle, Thomas Bourchier, Archbishop of Canterbury, while his lands remained in the hands of the crown. He was made a Knight of the Bath on 17 January 1478.

Neville had livery of his lands without proof of age on 8 May 1491. From 12 August of that year until 3 November 1529 he was summoned to Parliament by writs directed to 'Ricardo Nevill de Latimer chivaler'. However, in about 1494 his inheritance was contested by Robert Willoughby, 1st Baron Willoughby de Broke, who although summoned to the 1491 Parliament by writs directed to 'Roberto Willughby de Broke chivaler', nonetheless claimed that he was entitled to the Latimer barony and lands through his great-grandmother's brother, John Willoughby. Neville ultimately prevailed, and a herald recorded that 'the Lord Brooke had made a wrong claim'.

Neville's father-in-law, Sir Humphrey Stafford (c.1426/7 – 8 July 1486) of Grafton, Worcestershire, was a staunch supporter of King Richard III. After Richard's defeat at Bosworth, Stafford and Francis Lovell, 1st Viscount Lovell, fled to sanctuary at Colchester. In April 1486 they attempted to stir up rebellion against the new King, Henry VII, with Stafford trying to raise forces in the West Midlands, and Lovell in Yorkshire. When the rebellion collapsed, on 11 May 1486 Stafford again fled to sanctuary, this time at Culham, but was not allowed to claim the privilege, and for his part in the insurrection was executed at Tyburn on 8 July 1486.

In contrast, Neville appears to have supported the new regime. According to Ford, Neville's strengths were 'loyalty to the crown and military service'. On 16 June 1487 he fought at the Battle of Stoke with Henry VII's forces which put down the rising of the pretender, Lambert Simnel. He served with the army in the north after the Earl of Northumberland was assassinated in 1489, and was with the King's forces in Brittany in 1492. In 1499 he attended the trial of the pretender, Perkin Warbeck. In 1513 he was with the Earl of Surrey at the Battle of Flodden, where he fought in the vanguard. In September 1522 the Earl of Shrewsbury consulted him regarding war against the Duke of Albany.

Neville also served in non-military capacities. He was appointed to a number of commissions, and is recorded as being in attendance at festivities at court in 1488 and 1499. In 1503 he was among those who escorted King Henry VII's daughter, Margaret Tudor, between Tadcaster and York on her journey to Scotland to wed James IV. In November 1515 he was among those present at Westminster Abbey when Thomas Wolsey was made Cardinal.

On 13 July 1530 Neville was one of the signatories to the letter petitioning Pope Clement VII to grant Henry VIII a divorce from Catherine of Aragon. He died shortly before 28 December 1530 at Snape Castle, and was buried with his first wife, Anne Stafford, in the church of St. Michael at Well, North Yorkshire.

== Marriages and issue ==
Richard Neville married firstly, about 1490, Anne Stafford, daughter of Sir Humphrey Stafford of Grafton, Worcestershire, and Katherine Fray (d. 12 May 1482), the daughter of Sir John Fray, Chief Baron of the Exchequer, by Agnes Danvers (d. June 1478), the daughter of Sir John Danvers (died c.1448), by whom he had six sons and six daughters:

- John Neville, 3rd Baron Latimer, who married firstly, Dorothy de Vere, daughter of Sir George Vere by Margaret Stafford, and sister and coheir of John de Vere, 14th Earl of Oxford; secondly, Elizabeth Musgrave; and thirdly, Catherine Parr, later Henry VIII's sixth Queen.
- William Neville (15 July 1497 – c.1545), author of The Castell of Pleasure, who married, before 1 April 1529, Elizabeth Greville, the daughter of Sir Giles Greville, by whom he had a son, Richard Neville of Penwyn and Wyke Sapie, Worcestershire, and two daughters, Mary and Susan. After the death without male issue of John Neville, 4th Baron Latimer, William's son, Richard Neville (d. 27 May 1590), wrongfully assumed the title of Baron Latimer.
- Sir Thomas Neville of Piggotts Hall in Ardleigh, Essex, who married Mary Teye, the daughter and coheir of Sir Thomas Teye, by whom he had a son, Thomas.
- Marmaduke Neville of Marks Tey, who married Elizabeth Teye, the daughter and coheir of Sir Thomas Teye, by whom he had a son, Christopher, who died young, and a daughter, Alianore, who married Thomas Teye, esquire, of Layer de la Haye, Essex.
- George Neville, Archdeacon of Carlisle, (born 29 July 1509, buried 6 September 1567 at Well, North Yorkshire).
- Christopher Neville.
- Margaret Neville (born 9 March 1495), eldest daughter, who married, by papal dispensation dated 22 November 1505, Edward Willoughby (d. November 1517) of Alcester, Warwickshire, son of Robert Willoughby, 2nd Baron Willoughby de Broke (d. 10 or 11 November 1521), by his first wife, Elizabeth Beauchamp, by whom she had three daughters, Elizabeth (buried 15 November 1562), who married Sir Fulke Greville (d. 10 November 1559), Anne (d. 1528) and Blanche (d. before 1543), who married Francis Dawtrey. Elizabeth Willoughby and Sir Fulke Greville (d. 10 November 1559) were the grandparents of the courtier and author, Fulke Greville, 1st Baron Brooke. After Edward Willoughby's death in November 1517, his widow Margaret Neville married her 3rd cousin Sir William Gascoigne of Gawthorpe (as his 2nd wife; his 1st wife was Alice Frognall), son of Sir William Gascoigne of Gawthorpe and his wife Lady Margaret Percy, 4th daughter of Henry Percy, 3rd Earl of Northumberland. They had two children - Sir John Gascoigne, Lord of Louth in Lincolnshire, who married Barbara, and Dorothy Gascoigne who married Robert Constable of Flamborough, son of Sir Marmaduke Constable, Member of Parliament, by his 1st wife Elizabeth, daughter of Thomas Darcy, 1st Baron Darcy of Darcy.
- Dorothy Neville, who married John Dawnay
- Elizabeth Neville (born 28 April 1500), who married, before 1531, Sir Christopher Danby (c.1505 – 14 June 1571), of Farnley, West Yorkshire, only son of Sir Christopher Danby (d. 17 March 1518) and Margaret Scrope, daughter of Thomas Scrope, 5th Baron Scrope of Masham (d.1475). They had six sons, Sir Thomas Danby, Christopher Danby, John Danby, James Danby, Marmaduke Danby and William Danby, and eight daughters, Dorothy, who married Sir John Neville; Mary; Joan, who married Roger Meynell, esquire; Margaret, who married Christopher Hopton, esquire; Anne, who married Sir Walter Calverley; Elizabeth, who married Thomas Wentworth, esquire; Magdalen, who married Marmaduke Wyvill; and Margery, who married Christopher Mallory, esquire. Anne Danby and Sir Walter Calverley were the grandparents of Walter Calverley (d.1605), whose murder of his children is dramatised in A Yorkshire Tragedy, attributed on the title page to William Shakespeare. It seems likely that Anne's brother, William Danby, was the William Danby who served as coroner at the inquest into the death of Christopher Marlowe in 1593.
- Katherine Neville.
- Susan Neville (1501 – c.1560), who married the rebel Richard Norton (d. 9 April 1585), esquire, the eldest son of John Norton (d. 1557) by Anne Radcliffe (d. before 1557).
- Joan Neville.

By licence dated 5 July 1502 Richard Neville married secondly, Margaret Danby (d. 16 December 1521), the widow of Sir James Strangways.

== Ancestry ==
Ancestors of Richard Neville, 2nd Baron Latimer

16. John Neville, 3rd Baron Neville de Raby
8. Ralph de Neville, 1st Earl of Westmorland
17. Hon. Maud Percy
4. George Neville, 1st Baron Latimer
18. John of Gaunt, 1st Duke of Lancaster
9. Joan Beaufort, Countess of Westmorland
19. Katherine Swynford
2. Hon. Sir Henry Neville
20. Thomas de Beauchamp, 12th Earl of Warwick
10. Richard de Beauchamp, 13th Earl of Warwick
21. Margaret Ferrers
5. Lady Elizabeth Beauchamp
22. Thomas de Berkeley, 5th Baron Berkeley
11. Hon. Elizabeth Berkeley
23. Margaret de Lisle, suo jure 3rd Baroness Lisle
1. Richard Neville, 2nd Baron Latimer
24. Sir William Bourchier
12. William Bourchier, 1st Count of Eu
25. Eleanor de Louvain
6. John Bourchier, 1st Baron Berners
26. Thomas of Woodstock, 1st Duke of Gloucester
13. Anne of Gloucester
27. Lady Eleanor de Bohun
3. Hon. Joan Bourchier
28. Sir James de Berners, of West Horsley, Surrey
14. Richard Berners, of West Horsley, Surrey
29. Anne (—)
7. Margery Berners
30. Edward Dalyngrigge
15. Philippe Dalyngridge

== Footnotes ==
Peerage of England
| Preceded by George Neville | Baron Latimer; 1469–1530 | Succeeded by John Neville |
