= Snape with Thorp =

Civil parish in North Yorkshire, England

Coordinates: 54.254°N 1.590°W

- Civil parish

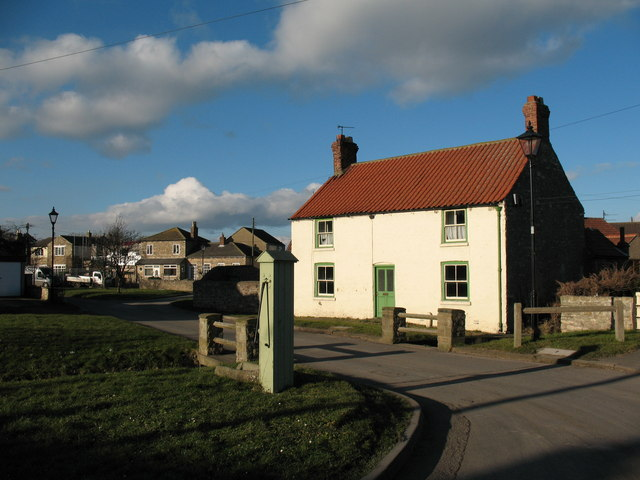
- Snape village, North Yorkshire
- Population: 410 (2011 census)
- OS grid reference: SE267843
- Civil parish: Snape with Thorp
- Unitary authority: North Yorkshire
- Ceremonial county: North Yorkshire
- Region: Yorkshire and the Humber
- Country: England
- Sovereign state: United Kingdom
- Post town: BEDALE, HAWES, LEYBURN
- Postcode district: DL8
- Police: North Yorkshire
- Fire: North Yorkshire
- Ambulance: Yorkshire

Snape with Thorp is a civil parish in the county of North Yorkshire, England. It comprises the village of Snape and the hamlet of Thorp. The population of the parish at the 2011 census was 410.

Within the parish lie the Grade I listed Snape Castle and Thorp Perrow, known for its extensive arboretum.

From 1974 to 2023 it was part of the Hambleton District, it is now administered by the unitary North Yorkshire Council.

== See also ==
- Listed buildings in Snape with Thorp
