= Well Hall, North Yorkshire =

Building in Well, North Yorkshire, England

Well Hall
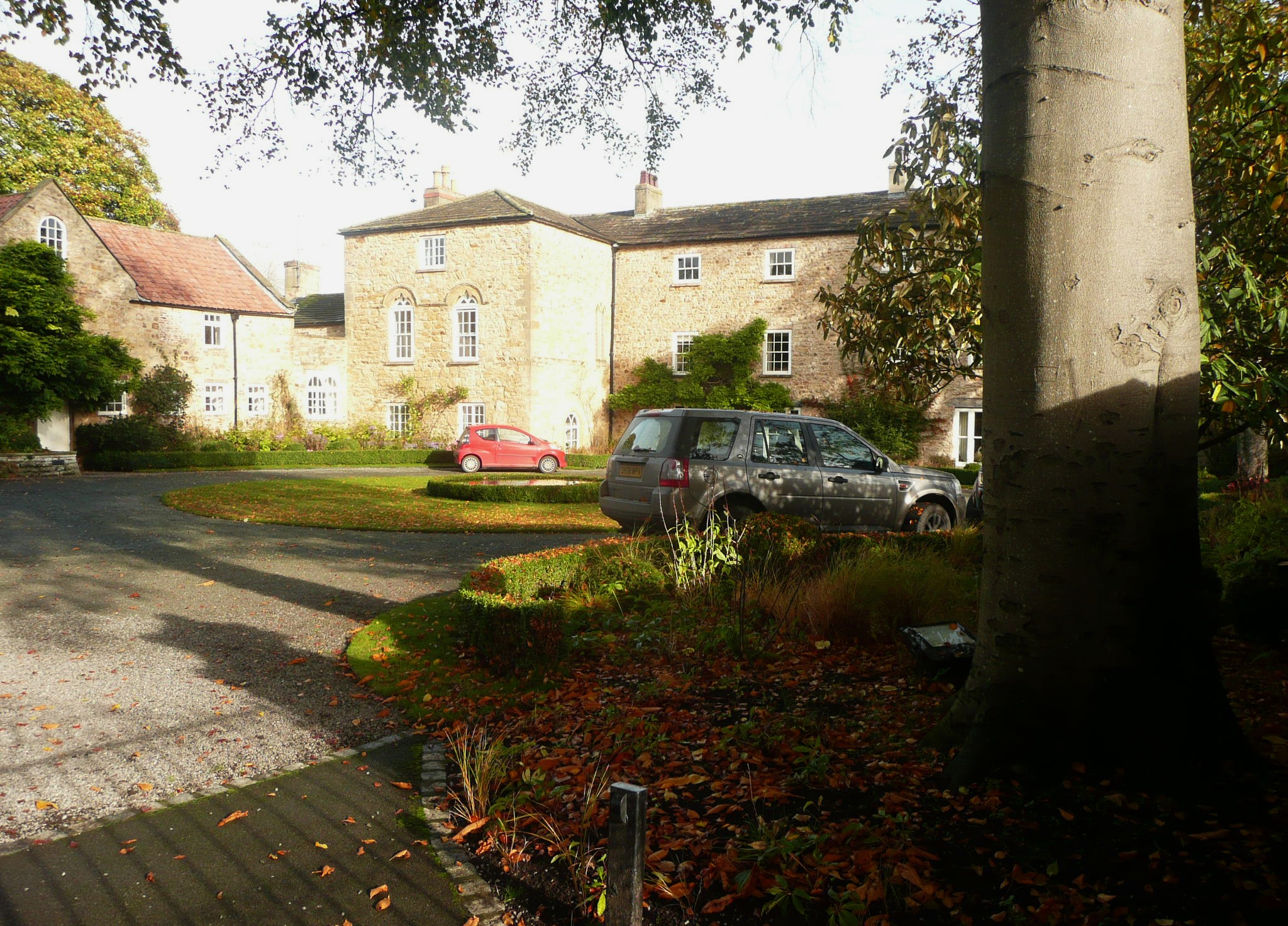
- The building in 2022

- Location within North Yorkshire

General information
- Location: Well, North Yorkshire, England
- Coordinates: 54.2331°N 1.5909°W
- Year built: Early 14th century
- Renovated: 17th century (heightened); 18th century (added)

Listed Building – Grade I
- Official name: The Hall
- Designated: 5 May 1952
- Reference no.: 1150773

Well Hall (officially listed as The Hall) is a historic building in Well, North Yorkshire, a village in England.

The building was constructed in 1342 as the Hospital of St Richard, an almshouse in the form of a hall house. It had an undercroft, which may be 13th century. The building was heightened in the 17th century, to provide a third storey in the former attic, and at some point both the ground and first floors were divided into rooms. In 1758, the almshouse relocated to St Michael's Cottages, and a large east–west wing was added to the building, which became a private house. The building was Grade I listed in 1952.

The house has a T-shaped plan, with three storeys, the older part with fronts of two and three bays, and to the right is a recessed 18th-century range with four bays. There is a vaulted four-bay undercroft under the north wing. The house is built of stone with quoins and a stone slate roof. The windows are sashes, some horizontally sliding. Two in the medieval wing are original pointed-arch openings. Inside, there is an early 18th-century staircase, probably moved from its original location. There is also a straight stone staircase, which is supported by a tunnel and may be original 14th-century work.

== See also ==
- Grade I listed buildings in North Yorkshire (district)
- Listed buildings in Well, North Yorkshire
