= Elizabeth Willoughby, 3rd Baroness Willoughby de Broke =

English noblewoman and wife of Sir Fulke Greville

Elizabeth Willoughby
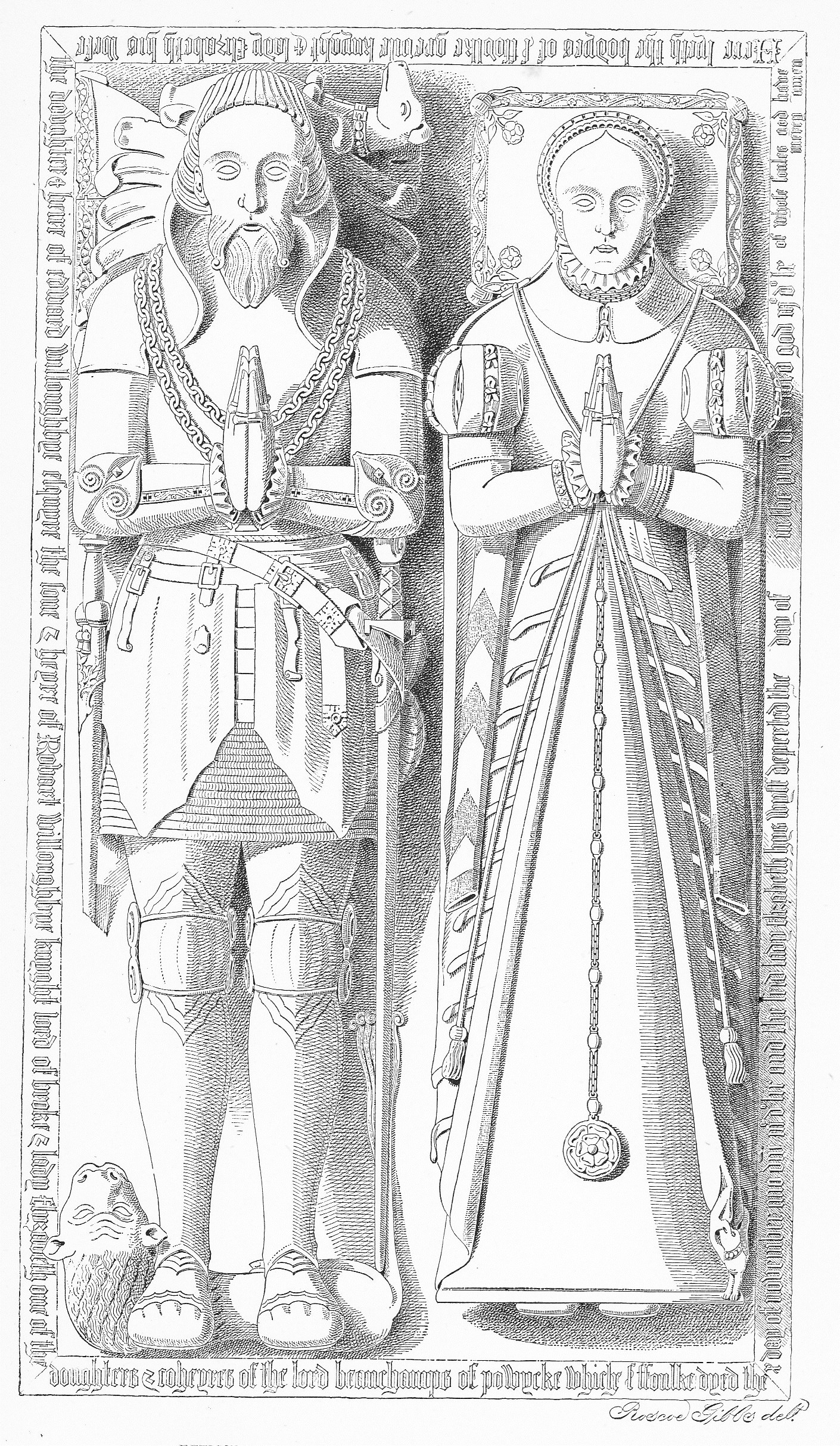
- Effigies of Sir Fulke Greville and Elizabeth Willoughby, Alcester Church, Warwickshire. (Note: Inscription in ledger-line: "Here lyeth the bodyes of s. ffoulke grevile knyght & lady Elizabeth his wefe the doughter & heire of edward willoughbye esquyre the sone & heyre of Robert willoughbye knyght lord of broke & lady Elizabeth one of the doughters & coheyres of the lord beauchamps of powycke whiche s ffoulke dyed the x day of november a'no d'ni M.o d.o lix and the seid lady Elizabeth hys wyff deperted the ...day of...in the yere of o.r lord god M.o d.o lx of whose soules god have mercy amen". Drawn by Roscoe Gibbs, 1890.)
- Born: c.1512
- Buried: 15 November 1562; Alcester, Warwickshire
- Noble family: Willoughby
- Spouse: Sir Fulke Greville
- Issue: Sir Fulke Greville; Robert Greville; Sir Edward Greville; Mary Greville; Eleanor Greville; Katherine Greville; Blanche Greville; Four other daughters
- Father: Edward Willoughby
- Mother: Margaret Neville

Elizabeth Willoughby, 3rd Baroness Willoughby de Broke, de jure 11th Baroness Latimer (c.1512 – c. 15 November 1562) was an English noblewoman and wife of Sir Fulke Greville.

== Life ==
Elizabeth Willoughby was the eldest daughter of Edward Willoughby, Esq., of Alcester, Warwickshire, and Powick, Worcestershire, and Margaret Neville, daughter of Richard Neville, 2nd Baron Latimer, and Anne Stafford. Elizabeth's father, Edward Willoughby, died in November 1517, leaving Elizabeth still a minor. Her wardship was acquired in 1522 by Sir Edward Greville of Milcote, Warwickshire. At her grandfather Robert Willoughby, 2nd Baron Willoughby de Broke's death on 11 November 1521, the baronies of Willoughby de Broke and Latimer fell into abeyance between his three granddaughters; all daughters of his son Edward; Elizabeth, Anne and Blanche. The barony was settled on Elizabeth after Anne and Blanche died childless.

Shortly before 11 April 1526 Sir Edward Greville married his ward Elizabeth to his second son, Sir Fulke Greville (bef. 1505–10 November 1559) of Beauchamps Court, Alcester. He did so because Elizabeth preferred Fulk over his older brother John. A manuscript dated 1644 entitled The Genealogie, Life and Death of Robert, Lord Brooke, then in the possession of the Earl of Warwick, describes their courtship:

In the days of Henry VIII, I read of Sir Edward Greville, of Milcote, who had the wardenship of Elizabeth, one of the daus. of the Lord Brooke's son. The knight made a motion to his ward to be married to John, his eldest son, but she refused, saying that she did like better of Fulke, his 2nd son. He told her that he had no estate of land to maintain her; and that he was in the King's service of warre beyond the seas, and therefore his return was very doubtful. Shee replied and said, that shee had an estate sufficient both for him and herself, and that she would pray for his safety and wait for his coming. Upon his return home, for the worthy services he had performed, he was by King Henry honoured with a knighthood; and then married Elizabeth, the dau. of the Lord Brooke's son.

In 1542/3 Elizabeth's husband, Fulke Greville, was knighted by Henry VIII for military service to the crown. He was High Sheriff of Warwickshire in 1543 and a member of Parliament from 1547. He further distinguished himself along with forty men in the suppression of the Pilgrimage of Grace and served in campaigns in 1544 against France. He built his wife and family a new house at Beauchamp's Court with stone reclaimed from Alcester Priory. Fulk died on 10 Nov 1559. Elizabeth died 9 November 1562 and was buried beside her husband with a monumental inscription.

At her death, the title passed to her eldest son, Fulke Greville, 4th Baron Willoughby de Broke.

== Family ==
Elizabeth Willoughby and Sir Fulke Greville had seven sons and eight daughters among whom were:

- Fulke Greville, 4th Baron Willoughby de Broke.
- Robert Greville
- Sir Edward Greville, who married Jane Grey.
- Mary Greville, who married William Harris.
- Eleanor Greville, who married Sir John Conway.
- Katherine Greville (d.1611), who married Giles Reade (d.1611), esquire, of Tewkesbury, Gloucestershire, by whom she had thirteen children.
- Blanche Greville.
- Four additional sons
- Four other daughters

== Ancestry ==
Ancestors of Elizabeth Willoughby, 3rd Baroness Willoughby de Broke

16. John Willoughby (1421–1477)
8. Robert Willoughby
17. Anne Cheney
4. Robert Willoughby
18. John Champernoun
9. Blanche Champernoun
2. Edward Willoughby
20. John Beauchamp, 1st Baron Beauchamp (fifth creation)
10.Richard Beauchamp, 2nd Baron Beauchamp
21. Margaret Ferrers
5. Elizabeth Beauchamp
22. Humphrey Stafford
11. Elizabeth Stafford
23. Eleanor Aylesbury
1. Elizabeth Willoughby
24. George Neville, 1st Baron Latimer
12. Henry Neville
25. Elizabeth Beauchamp
6. Richard Neville
26. John Bourchier
13. Joan Bourchier
27. Margery Berners
3. Margaret Neville
14. Humphrey Stafford
7. Anne Stafford
30. John Fray
15. Katherine Fray
31. Agnes Danvers

Source: Faris, Plantagenet Ancestry (NEHGS, 1999), pp. 40–1, 208-09, 216

== Notes ==
Peerage of England
Preceded by Robert Willoughby	Baroness Willoughby de Broke; 1536–1562	Succeeded by Fulke Greville
