= Edmund Neville =

English courtier and peerage claimant

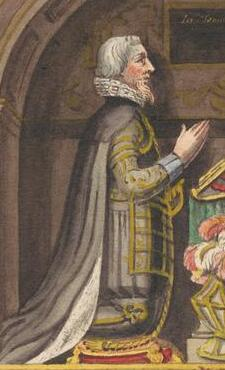
- effigy from St Mary Magdalene's Church, East Ham
- Born: before 1555
- Died: c.1620 Brussels
- Noble family: House of Neville
- Spouses: Jane Martignis; Jane Smythe
- Issue: Ralph Neville; Several daughters
- Father: Richard Neville
- Mother: Barbara Arden

Edmund Neville (before 1555 – in or after 1620), was an English courtier and peerage claimant, and possible conspirator. He was allegedly involved in Parry's Plot.

== Family ==
Edmund Neville, born before 1555, was the son of Richard Neville (d. 27 May 1590) of Penwyn and Wyke Sapie, Worcestershire, by Barbara Arden, the daughter of William Arden of Park Hall, Warwickshire. Edmund Neville's father, Richard Neville, was the son of William Neville, and the grandson of Richard Neville, 2nd Baron Latimer.

== Career ==
Neville lived for some time abroad, it was said in the Spanish service. About the beginning of 1584 he returned to England, claiming to be the heir male to John Neville, 4th Baron Latimer. Lord Burghley's son, Thomas Cecil, had married Dorothy Neville, one of the four daughters and co-heirs of the 4th Baron Latimer, and according to Archbold, 'hence was glad to take any opportunity of injuring Edmund'. He was suspected from the moment of his return. A merchant named Wright alleged that he had seen him at Rouen, and that while there he had lodged with the Nortons (see Richard Norton, rebel of the Rising of the North). In 1584 Neville was concerned in William Parry's plot to kill the Queen; Parry seems to have been in communication with him. Neville was sent to the Tower of London, and in 1585 revealed the whole affair.

He remained long in theTower, though he made efforts to get out. In 1595 he brought a charge of treason against the lieutenant of the Tower. He was soon afterwards liberated, and probably went abroad. He claimed the earldom of Westmorland after the death of Charles Neville, 6th Earl of Westmorland, in 1601, possibly with some justification; but his petition was not heard.

Neville appears to have died some years before, in or after 1620 at Brussels, 'probably in poverty'. A monument to his memory was placed in the chancel of Eastham Church, Essex.

== Family ==
Neville married, first, Jane Martignis, dame de Colombe, a lady of Hainault, by whom he left no issue; secondly, Jane Smythe (died c.1646), daughter of Richard Smythe, member of a Warwickshire family, by whom he left a son, Ralph, and several daughters. His widow had, probably as a compensation for her husband's claims, a pension of £100 a year from James I.
