= John Skut =

John Skut or Scut was a royal tailor during the reign of Henry VIII of England, working for his queens consort and other courtiers. He also made costumes for the revels and masques at court.

== Services ==
Skut began his services to Katherine of Aragon in 1519 and served all of the King's six wives: Katherine of Aragon, Anne Boleyn, Jane Seymour, Anne of Cleves, Katherine Howard and Katherine Parr.

The privy purse accounts of Henry VIII include a payment for 16 yards of green damask fabric for John Skut to make clothes for Anne Boleyn in June 1532.

Skut made clothes for Margaret Neville, a daughter of John Neville, 3rd Baron Latimer and step-daughter of Katherine Parr. These included gowns in French, Dutch, Italian, and Venetian styles, and French hoods.
