= 5th Parliament of Elizabeth I =

16th-century session of the English legislature

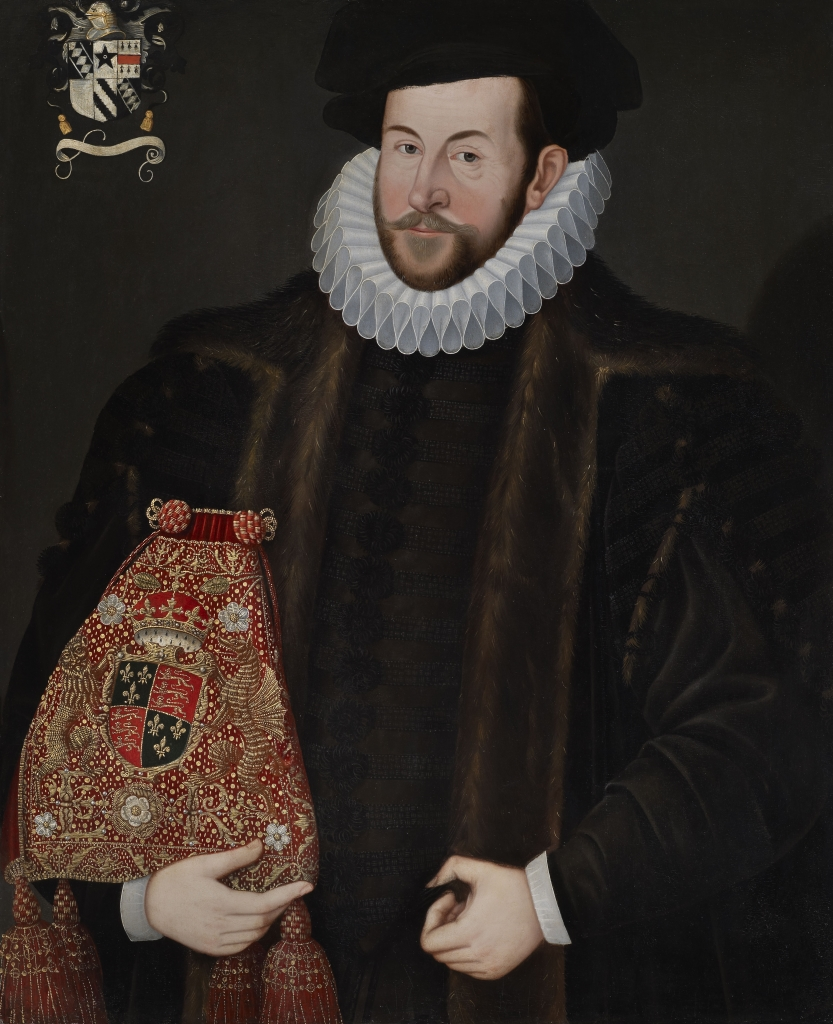
Sir John Puckering, Speaker

The 5th Parliament of Queen Elizabeth I was summoned by Queen Elizabeth I of England on 12 October 1584 and assembled on 23 November 1584. The size of the House of Commons had by now increased further to 460 members, compared with only 402 in her first Parliament of 1558/9.

Like the 4th Parliament of 1572, Elizabeth's 5th Parliament was called in response to a Catholic conspiracy aimed at putting Mary Stuart, Queen of Scots on to the English throne. The Throckmorton Plot, as it came to be known, was a foiled conspiracy to assassinate Queen Elizabeth and free Mary Stuart from house arrest. The plan envisaged coordinating the assassination with an invasion of England led by Henry I, Duke of Guise, financed by Spain and the Pope, and a simultaneous revolt of English Roman Catholics, involving both the Jesuits and the English Cardinal Allen. Fears for the safety of Queen and country were amplified by the recent assassination of William of Orange, leader of the Dutch Protestants. John Puckering, a sergeant-at-law, was appointed Speaker of the House of Commons and as in previous Parliaments Elizabeth attempted to prevent the House of Commons from engaging in debate on religious matters.

After two weeks' discussion of national security issues the debate turned inexorably to a proposal to control Jesuits and seminary priests, which was challenged by Dr William Parry, MP for Queenborough. Parry was an inconsistent Government spy, a double agent who had secretly converted to Roman Catholicism. He was interrogated about his motives and released, but denounced by a colleague a short time later. Confessing under further interrogation to plans to kill the Queen, he was himself hanged, drawn and quartered on 2 March 1585.

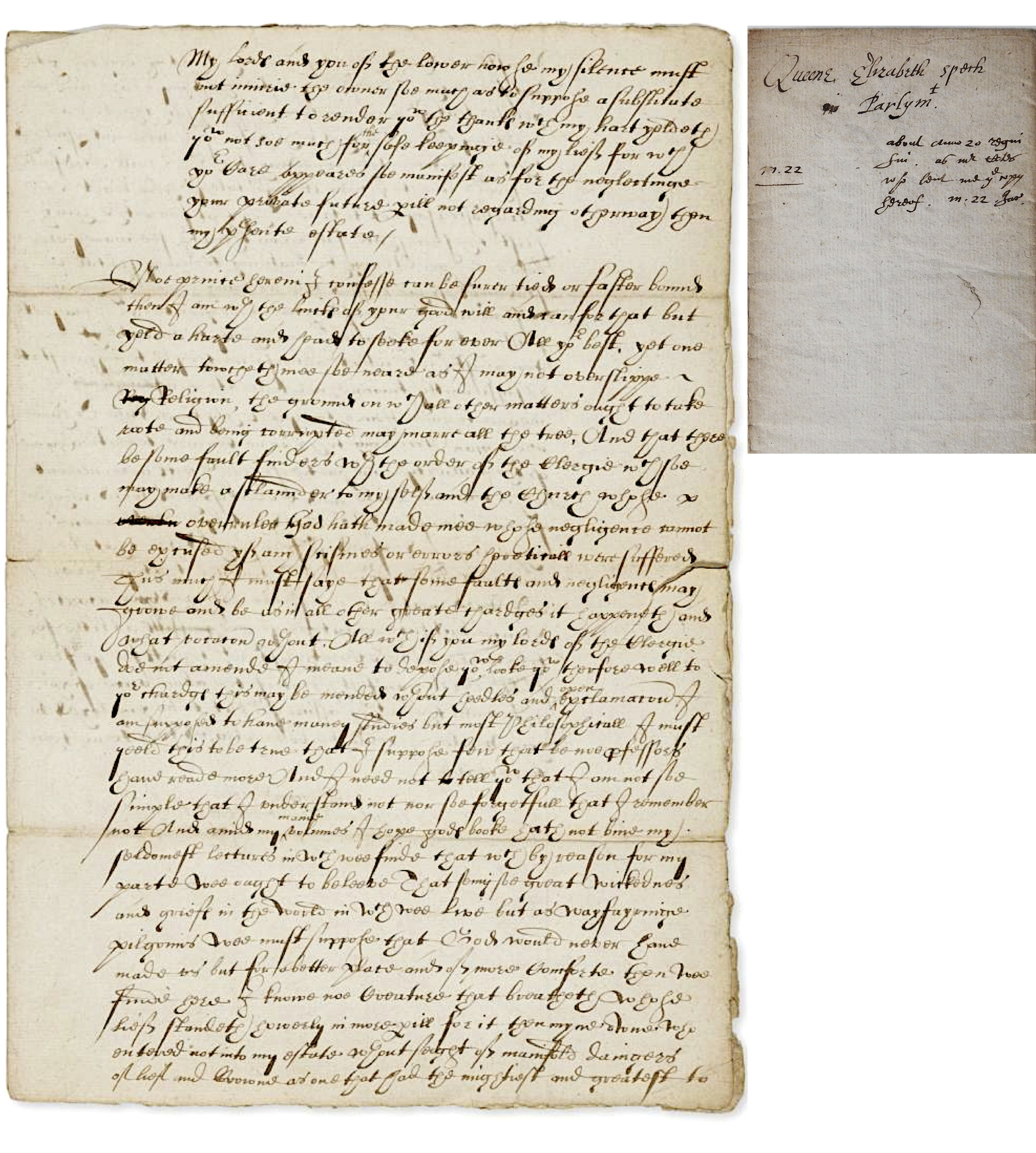
Queen's warning to the clerics, Collection Yuko Nii Foundation

Further debate on religious matters such as better observance of the Sabbath and clerical abuses was interrupted by a warning from the Queen, although the Sabbath observance bill and several other religion orientated bills passed the third reading, only to be vetoed by Elizabeth at the end of the Parliament.

The usual question of supply (funds voted to the crown for the administration of the realm) was not settled until February 1585. During the session a total of 31 Statutes and 18 private measures received royal assent, including an Act to preserve timber supplies by regulating iron mills. The Parliament was then prorogued (suspended) until 14 November 1586, but dissolved in the prior September to allow a new Parliament to be urgently summoned.

== Notable acts of the Parliament ==
- Safety of the Queen, etc. Act 1584
- Jesuits, etc. Act 1584
- Treason Act 1586

== See also ==
- List of acts of the 5th Parliament of Queen Elizabeth I
- List of parliaments of England
