= St Michael's Cottages =

Building in Well, North Yorkshire, England

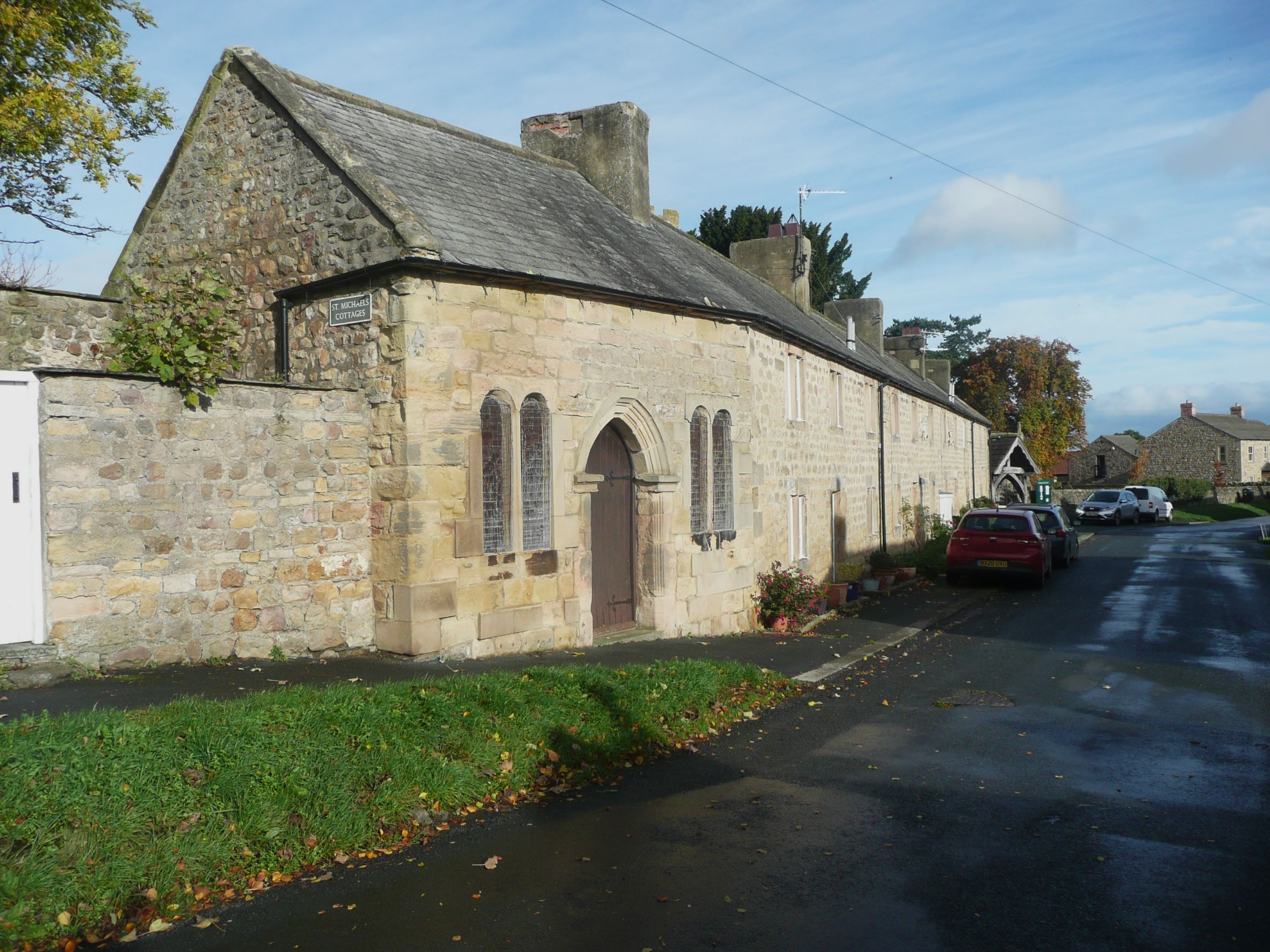
- The building in 2022

- Location within North Yorkshire

General information
- Location: Church Street, Well, North Yorkshire, England
- Coordinates: 54.2331°N 1.5904°W
- Year built: 1758

Listed Building – Grade II
- Official name: St Michaels Cottages and Chapel
- Designated: 5 May 1952
- Reference no.: 1293917

St Michael's Cottages are a historic building on Church Street in Well, North Yorkshire, a village in England.

The almshouse St Michael's Hospital was founded in Well in 1342. In 1758, a purpose-built row of four almshouses was constructed, with a chapel at the south end, and the old building was converted to become Well Hall. The mullions, and chapel doorway and windows reuse older stone. Until the 20th century, each almshouse was divided, with the ground floor of each occupied by two men, and the first floor by two women. In 1883, the building was restored by F. A. Milbank. The building was Grade II listed in 1952.

The building is constructed of stone and have a Welsh slate roof with stone coping. Each cottage has two storeys and three bays, and the chapel has two bays. All the cottages have a central doorway with chamfered jambs, and two-light windows with stone surrounds and moulded mullions. On the front are two coats of arms, and a water pump with a datestone above. The chapel has a central doorway with a pointed arch, a moulded surround and moulded imposts, and it is flanked by two-light mullioned windows with round-headed lights.

== See also ==
- Listed buildings in Well, North Yorkshire
