= Henry Pepwell =

Henry Pepwell (or Pepwall) (died 1539 or 1540) was an English printer.

Born in Birmingham, Pepwell set up business from 1518 at the former house of the stationer Henry Jacobi in St Paul's Churchyard, London. The first book he printed was William Neville's Castell of Pleasure. He was also involved with printing early English humanist works. In 1525-6 he was warden of the Company of Stationers.
