= Snape Castle =

Listed building in North Yorkshire, England

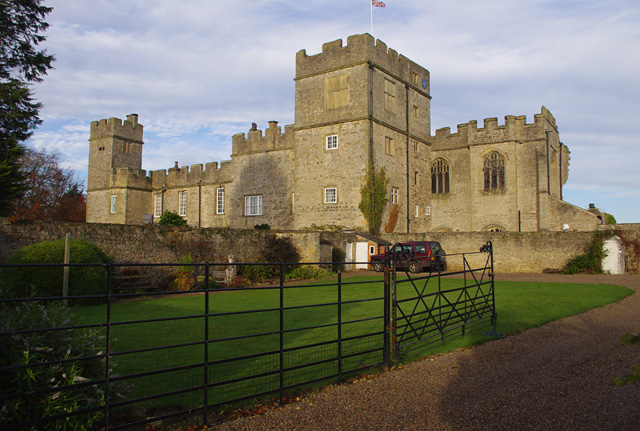
- Snape Castle

- Location within North Yorkshire
- 54.254°N 1.599°W
- Location: Snape, North Yorkshire
- OS grid reference: SE261843

History
- Built: c. 1430
- Rebuilt: 1587

Listed Building – Grade I
- Designated: 5 May 1952
- Reference no.: 1190147

Scheduled monument
- Official name: Snape Castle, Snape with Thorp – Hambleton
- Reference no.: 1004908

Snape Castle is a semi-fortified manor house in the village of Snape, North Yorkshire, England. The castle is 3 miles (5 km) south of Bedale and 10 miles (16 km) north of Ripon. At the time of Henry VIII, John Leland described it as "...a goodly castel in a valley [be]longing to the Lorde Latimer.." The castle is now a private residence, and is a grade I listed building.

== History ==
References throughout history have indicated that a manor house was built on the site by Ralph FitzRanulph of Middleham. His daughter, the Lady of Middleham married Robert Neville, Robert de Neville's son, and the building stayed in the Neville family until the 16th century. Snape Castle itself, which lies at the western edge of the village of Snape, was built sometime in the early 15th century, (between 1425 and 1430), when George Neville, inherited the land and buildings from his father, Ralph, the Earl of Westmorland. Although variously described as a manor house, or a hall, some thought was given over to defensive measures; the surrounding land, which was prone to flooding and so marshy, was kept in place. The original castle was planned around a courtyard measuring 140 feet (43 m) north to south, and 180 feet (55 m) west to east.

During the 15th century, both Cecily Neville and Queen Anne lived at the castle, providing a link to Richard III; Neville being his mother and Anne his wife.

In January 1537, a mob stormed the castle and took Katherine Parr and the two children hostage. (Note: The children were not Parr's, but her husband's from a previous marriage – Neville had twice been made a widower prior to his third marriage to Parr.) The mob consisted of members of the Pilgrimage of Grace who were worried that John Neville (Third Baron Latimer, and Parr's then husband), would betray them to Henry VIII. Neville, who was trying to mediate between the King and the northern countrymen, hastened back to the castle where he was able to persuade the mob to leave and release his family. The cleric and antiquary, John Leland described the manor at Snape as "..'a goodly castel in a valley longing to the Lorde Latimer, and ii or iii parkes welle woddid abowt it."

In 1577, Sir Thomas Cecil inherited the Manor of Snape through his wife, Dorothy Neville, whom he had married in 1564. In 1577, Thomas set about rebuilding the castle, though he did not use it after 1578 when he inherited the Burghley estate near Stamford from his father. Cecil's renovation of the castle provided its towers, but these were for effect rather than defence, and has led to it being called a "sham castle". The west wall contains an Elizabethan chimney with the date of 1587, the assumed date of the completion of Cecil's efforts.

The estate was sold in 1798 to William Milbank of nearby Thorpe Perrow. Still partly inhabited, the castle retains its Perpendicular windows as built by Cecil. The building is now registered with Historic England as a Grade I listed structure.

=== Chapel ===
On the eastern side of the castle is the chapel, dedicated to St Mary. This used to be private chapel for those in the castle, (Parr is said to have married Latimer in the chapel) but has been used for public worship. The chapel has a memorial to those from Snape who died in the First World War. In the late 17th century, the 15th century roof of the chapel was taken down to allow a plaster one to be installed, which the noted Italian painter Antonio Verrio decorated. Verrio's painting depicted the angels being expelled from heaven, called Wonder and War in Heaven. However, damp quickly ruined the painting by 1725, and the use of the chapel as a store further deteriorated the painting. The chapel retains its Perpendicular windows, and was renovated between 1837 and 1887.

== See also ==
- Grade I listed buildings in North Yorkshire (district)
- Listed buildings in Snape with Thorp
