= St Michael's Church, Well =

Church in Well, North Yorkshire, England

Coordinates: 54.2335°N 1.5902°W

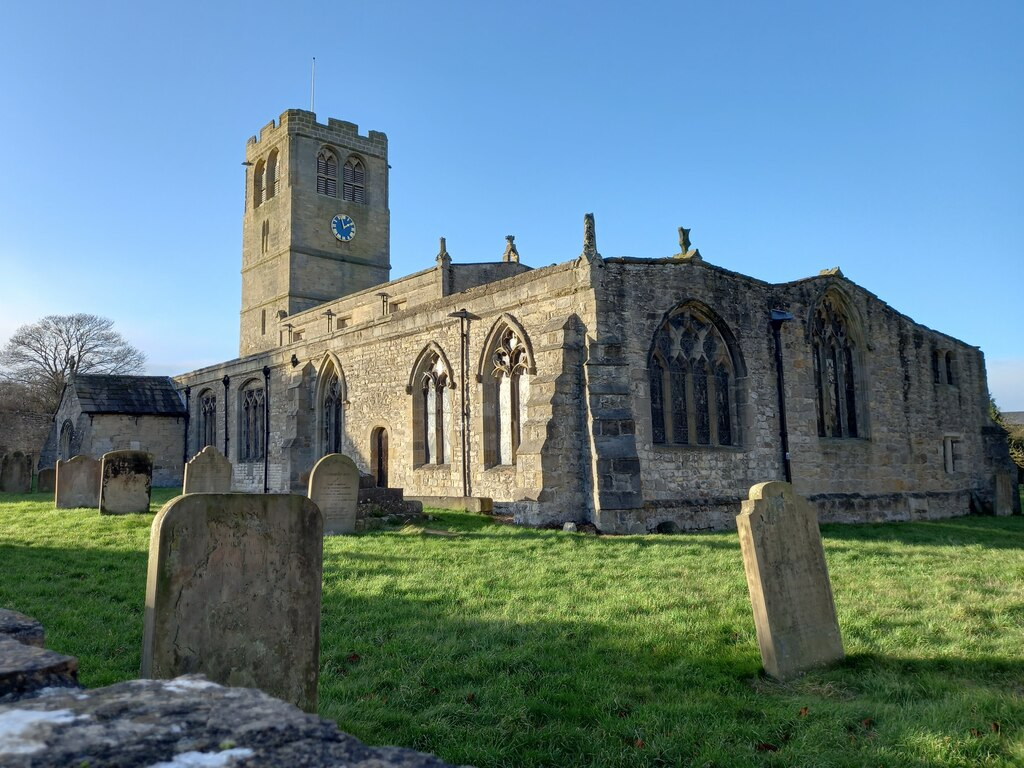
The church, in 2022

St Michael's Church is the parish church of Well, North Yorkshire, a village in England.

The church was built in the late 12th century, from which period survive the lower part of the tower, south doorway, parts of the chancel arch and lower parts of the nave arcades. In the early 14th century the nave was rebuilt, with the addition of a clerestory, and the chancel was rebuilt. The upper parts of the tower were added in the 15th century. The building was restored in 1844. The building was grade I listed in 1966.

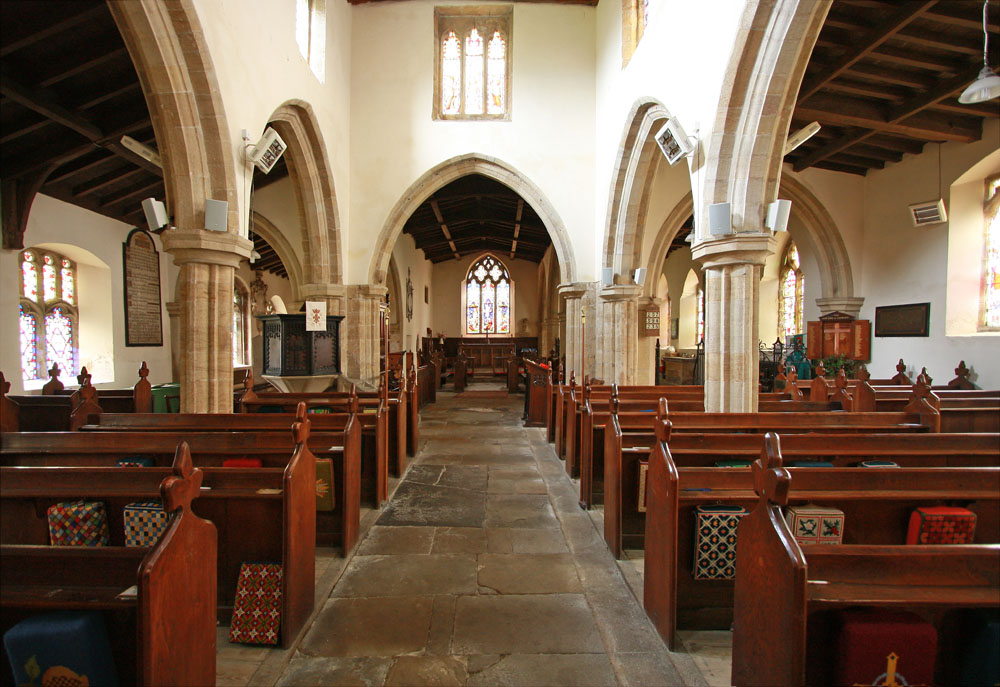
View from the nave into the chancel

The church is built of stone with roofs of stone slate and lead. It consists of a nave with a clerestory, north and south aisles, a south porch, a chancel with a south aisle and a small north aisle with a vestry, and a west tower. The tower has four stages, the tall bottom stage dating from the 12th century. There is a small lean-to stair turret on the north side, and the tower contains small single-light openings, a west window, bands, clock faces, paired bell openings, and an embattled parapet. The porch is gabled, and contains a doorway with a pointed arch and a moulded surround. The inner doorway dates from the 12th century, and has a round arch, with three orders of colonnettes, waterleaf capitals, and roll-moulding.

Inside, the font has a wooden cover dating from 1352, and there is a wooden reredos in the north chapel, made in the 16th century in the Netherlands. There is part of a Roman mosaic found locally in 1859, and two tomb chests dating from the 16th century. The east window of the south chapel has some 14th-century stained glass, but it was heavily restored in 1852.

== See also ==
- Grade I listed buildings in North Yorkshire (district)
- Listed buildings in Well, North Yorkshire
