= George Neville, 1st Baron Latimer =

English noble (c.1406–1469)

- Died: 30 December 1469
- Noble family: Neville
- Spouse: Elizabeth Beauchamp
- Issue: Sir Henry Neville; Thomas Neville; Jane Neville; Katherine Neville
- Father: Ralph Neville, 1st Earl of Westmorland
- Mother: Joan Beaufort

George Neville, 1st Baron Latimer or (Latymer) (died 30 December 1469) was an English nobleman.

== Life ==
George Neville was born c.1406-1407 as the fifth son of Ralph Neville, 1st Earl of Westmorland, with his second wife Joan Beaufort, daughter of John of Gaunt. He succeeded to the Latymer estates on the death of his half-uncle John Neville, 6th Baron Latimer, in 1430 (see Baron Latimer), and on 25 February 1432 he was summoned to Parliament as Baron Latimer. He later fought in Scotland in 1436, was a Justice of the Peace for Cumberland in 1437 and admitted to the Privy Council in 1439.

George Neville appears to have suffered from some form of dementia in his later years, as he was described as an "idiot," and the guardianship of his lands was given to his nephew, Richard Neville, 16th Earl of Warwick, the Kingmaker. He died on 30 December 1469 and was succeeded in the barony by his grandson Richard, his eldest son Sir Henry Neville having predeceased him by several months, dying before the Battle of Edgcote, 23 July 1469.

== Marriage and issue ==
In 1437, Lord Latimer married Lady Elizabeth (1417–1480), daughter of Richard de Beauchamp, 13th Earl of Warwick, by his first wife, Elizabeth Berkeley. They had four children:

- Katherine Neville, who died childless.
- Sir Henry Neville (d. 23 July 1469), who married Joan Bourchier, daughter of John Bourchier, 1st Baron Berners, and Marjorie Berners, and had:
  - Joan Neville, born ca 1464, Latimer, Buckinghamshire, England; she married Sir James Ratclyffe.
  - Richard Neville, 2nd Baron Latimer (Latimer, Buckinghamshire / Sinnington, North Riding of Yorkshire, ca. 1468 – Snape, North Yorkshire, December 1530, bur. Well, North Yorkshire), married in Grafton, Worcestershire, in 1490 to Anne Stafford (Grafton, Worcestershire, ca. 1471 – aft. 1513, bur. Well, North Yorkshire), daughter of Sir Humphrey Stafford of Grafton (Grafton, Worcestershire, ca. 1427 – executed by order of King Henry VII for siding with Richard III, Tyburn, 8 July 1486) and Catherine Fray (1437–1482), and had issue which included John Neville, 3rd Baron Latimer.
  - Thomas Neville (1468–1546) (Esq.), born in Shenstone, Staffordshire, England. He was Lord of Mathom; married Letitia Harcourt (1494–1520), daughter of Sir Robert Harcourt of Stanton Harcourt and Agnes Lymbrake and had issue.
- Thomas Neville, of Shenstone, Staffordshire.
- Jane Neville, who married Oliver Dudley.

Peerage of England
New creation	Baron Latimer; 1432–1469	Succeeded by Richard Neville
