= John Bourchier, 1st Baron Berners =

English peer (died 1474)

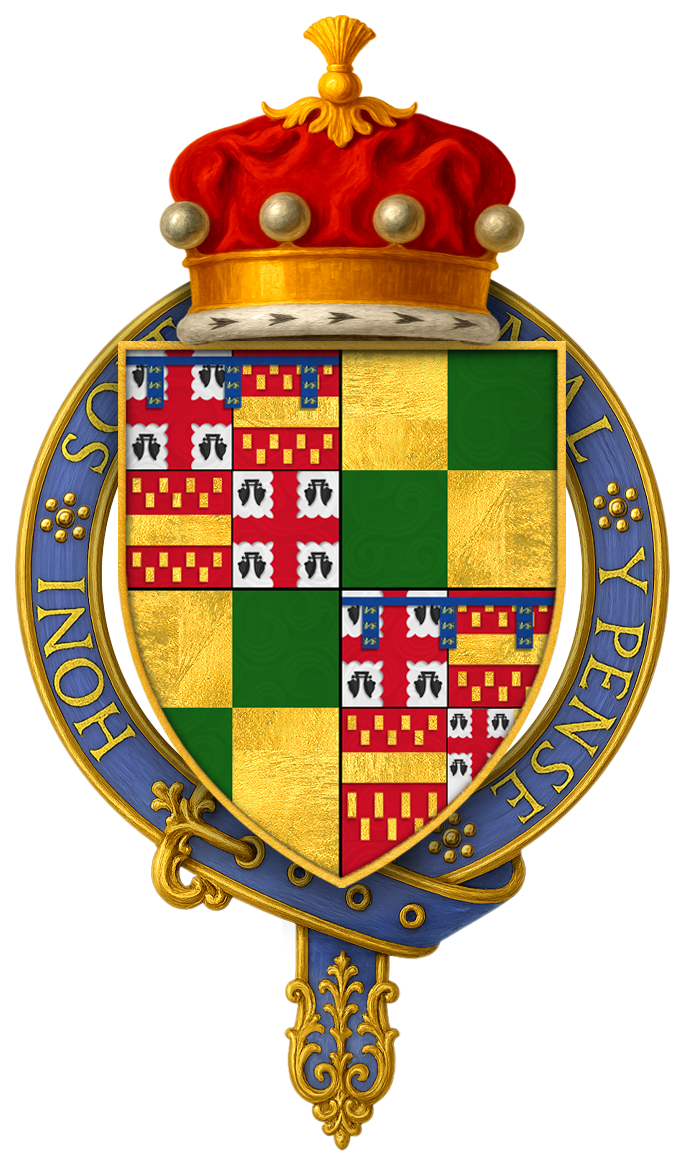
Coat of Arms of Sir John Bourchier, 1st Baron Berners, KG

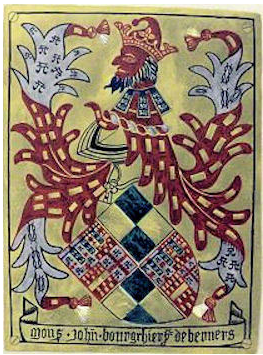
Garter stall plate of John Bourchier, 1st Baron Berners (1415–1474), KG. Arms: Quarterly: 1st and 4th, grand-quarters 1st and 4th: Argent, a cross engrailed gules between four water bougets sable (Bourchier); grand-quarters 2nd and 3rd: Gules billety or a fess of the last (Lovain of Little Easton) over all a label azure for difference of three points each charged with three leopards or; 2nd and 3rd: Quarterly or and vert (Berners). Crest: A man's (Moor's) head in profile proper ducally crowned or with a pointed cap gules The mantling is semé with billets or of Lovain, and with water bougets sable and Bourchier knots

John Bourchier, 1st Baron Berners (died May 1474) was an English peer.

Bourchier was the fourth son of William Bourchier, 1st Count of Eu, and his wife Anne of Woodstock, Countess of Buckingham, daughter of Thomas of Woodstock, 1st Duke of Gloucester. Henry Bourchier, 1st Earl of Essex, and William Bourchier, 9th Baron FitzWarin jure uxoris, were his elder brothers.

He was knighted in 1426 and in 1455 he was summoned to the House of Lords as John Bourchier de Berners, which created the title of Baron Berners. In 1459 he was further honoured when he was made a Knight of the Garter. He also served as Constable of Windsor Castle from 1461 to 1474.

Lord Berners married Margery Berners (died 18 December 1475), daughter of Sir Richard Berners and Philippe Dalyngride, daughter of Sir Edward Dalyngridgge.

He died in May 1474 and was succeeded in the barony by his grandson John Bourchier, 2nd Baron Berners, his son Sir Humphrey Bourchier having been killed at the Battle of Barnet in 1471. Margery, Lady Berners, died in 1475. His daughter Joan Bourchier married Sir Henry Neville (died 26 July 1469), son of George Neville, 1st Baron Latimer and Elizabeth Beauchamp, and had issue which included Richard Neville, 2nd Baron Latimer, father of John Nevill, 3rd Baron Latimer.

His daughter, Elizabeth Bourchier (d. 1470), married Robert Welles, 8th Baron Willoughby de Eresby and survived him by only a few months, and was buried by his side in the church of the Whitefriars in Doncaster. She left a will dated 2 October 1470.

John Bourchier was buried at Chertsey Abbey, in the Runnymede borough of Surrey

== Ancestry ==
Ancestors of John Bourchier, 1st Baron Berners

16. John de Bourchier
8. Robert Bourchier, 1st Baron Bourchier
17. Helen Colchester
4. Sir William Bourchier
18. Thomas Prayers
9. Margaret Prayers
19. Margaret de Essex
2. William Bourchier, 1st Count of Eu
20. Thomas de Louvaine
10. Sir John de Louvaine
21. Joan de Basing
5. Alianore de Lovayne
22. Sir Thomas Weston
11. Margaret Weston
23. ??
1. John Bourchier, 1st Baron Berners
24. Edward II of England
12. Edward III of England
25. Isabella of France
6. Thomas of Woodstock, 1st Duke of Gloucester
26. William I, Count of Hainaut
13. Philippa of Hainault
27. Joan of Valois
3. Anne of Gloucester
28. William de Bohun, 1st Earl of Northampton
14. Humphrey de Bohun, 7th Earl of Hereford
29. Elizabeth de Badlesmere
7. Eleanor de Bohun
30. Richard Fitzalan, 10th Earl of Arundel
15. Joan Fitzalan
31. Eleanor of Lancaster

Peerage of England
New creation	Baron Berners; 1455–1474	Succeeded by John Bourchier
