= Listed buildings in Snape with Thorp =

Snape with Thorp is a civil parish in the county of North Yorkshire, England. It contains twelve listed buildings that are recorded in the National Heritage List for England. Of these, one is listed at Grade I, the highest of the three grades, one is at Grade II*, the middle grade, and the others are at Grade II, the lowest grade. The parish contains the village of Snape and the hamlet of Thorpe, and the surrounding countryside. The most important building in the parish is Snape Castle, which is listed, together with associated structures. The other listed buildings are houses and cottages, a public house, a dovecote and a barn.

== Key ==
Grade	Criteria
I	Buildings of exceptional interest, sometimes considered to be internationally important
II*	Particularly important buildings of more than special interest
II	Buildings of national importance and special interest

== Buildings ==
Name and location	Photograph	Date	Notes	Grade
Snape Castle; 54.25445°N 1.59940°W		c. 1430	The building is partly in ruins, and the remaining south wing has been converted into two houses. It is built in stone with embattled parapets, and lead roofs, and has a rectangular plan with a tower at each corner, and to the southeast is a chapel. The south front has nine bays, the outer bays being towers, the left with three storeys and the right with four, and the bays between have two and three storeys. On the fifth bay is a round-headed doorway with pilasters, and an architrave with a cornice, and above it is a panel containing a crest in a round architrave. Most of the windows are sashes, some tripartite and some with chamfered surrounds, and there are also mullioned and transomed windows. The chapel has two storeys and two bays.	I
The Old Blacksmith's Cottage; 54.25385°N 1.59540°W	—	16th century (probable)	The cottage has a timber framed core, the walls are in rendered stone, and it has a pantile roof. There is one storey, two bays, and an outshut on the front on the left. On the front is a doorway and two sash windows. Inside, there is surviving timber framing, and a large inglenook fireplace.	II
Stables east of Snape Castle; 54.25454°N 1.59815°W		Early 17th century	The building is in stone with a stone slate roof. There are two storeys and an L-shaped plan, with a main block of two bays, and a lower wing of four bays. The main block has a four-centred arched doorway, on the wing are two openings with chamfered surrounds and coats of arms, and the gable at the east end has a two-light mullioned window.	II
Lilac Cottage; 54.25390°N 1.59568°W	—	17th century	The cottage is in stone and cobble, it is rendered, and has a pantile roof. There is a single storey and five bays. The central doorway has a chamfered surround, and the windows are a mix of horizontally sliding sashes and casements. Inside, there are four pairs of cruck trusses, and an inglenook fireplace.	II
Dovecote east of Snape Castle; 54.25442°N 1.59754°W		17th century	The dovecote is in stone, with quoins, a concave cornice, and a pyramidal stone slate roof. There are two storeys and a square plan. It contains a double-chamfered two-light mullioned opening in the upper floor, and has a lantern with a finial.	II
Springfield House; 54.25409°N 1.58704°W	—	17th century (probable)	The cottage is in stone, it is rendered, and has a pantile roof. There is a single storey, three bays, and a single-bay outshut on the left return. On the front is a doorway and casement windows, and inside there are three cruck trusses.	II
Dovecote, Watlass Moor House; 54.24605°N 1.62971°W	—	17th century (probable)	The dovecote is in stone, with a conical round-topped stone slate roof, and it has a circular plan. It contains a board door, and small square openings below the eaves. Inside, there are terracotta cylindrical nesting boxes.	II
Thorp Perrow Hall; 54.26393°N 1.59909°W		Early 18th century	A large house in rendered stone with a hipped stone slate roof. The main front has eleven bays, the middle nine with three storeys and the outer bays with two, and returns of five bays, the middle three bays bowed. On the front is a porte cochère of two pillars and six fluted Ionic columns, and a doorway with pilasters and a moulded archivolt. Above it is a tripartite sash window with pilasters and columns carrying an entablature with a swagged frieze and a triangular pediment. The other windows are sashes in architraves, and on the outer bays are Venetian windows in arched recesses.	II*
Castle Arms; 54.25444°N 1.59172°W		Early to mid-18th century	The public house is in whitewashed stone and has a pantile roof. There are two storeys and four bays. The doorway is in the centre, and the windows are sashes. Inside, there is an inglenook fireplace.	II
Two gateways, Snape Castle; 54.25405°N 1.59958°W		18th century	The wall along the south boundary contains two gateways. Each is flanked by square piers with a cornice and a blocking course, and the remains of a base for an urn.	II
West Garth House; 54.25437°N 1.59475°W	—	Late 18th century	The house is in stone with a pantile roof. There are two storeys and four bays. The doorway is on the left return, the windows are sashes, and on the left bay is a canted bay window with a frieze and a pediment.	II
Cruck barn 54.25450°N 1.59151°W	—	Early 19th century	The barn adjacent to the Castle Arms is in stone with brick dressings and a pantile roof. There is a single storey, and it contains a stable door and a horizontally sliding sash window. Inside, there is a single pair of crucks.	II
