= Thorp Perrow Hall =

Building in North Yorkshire, England

Coordinates: 54.2639°N 1.5991°W

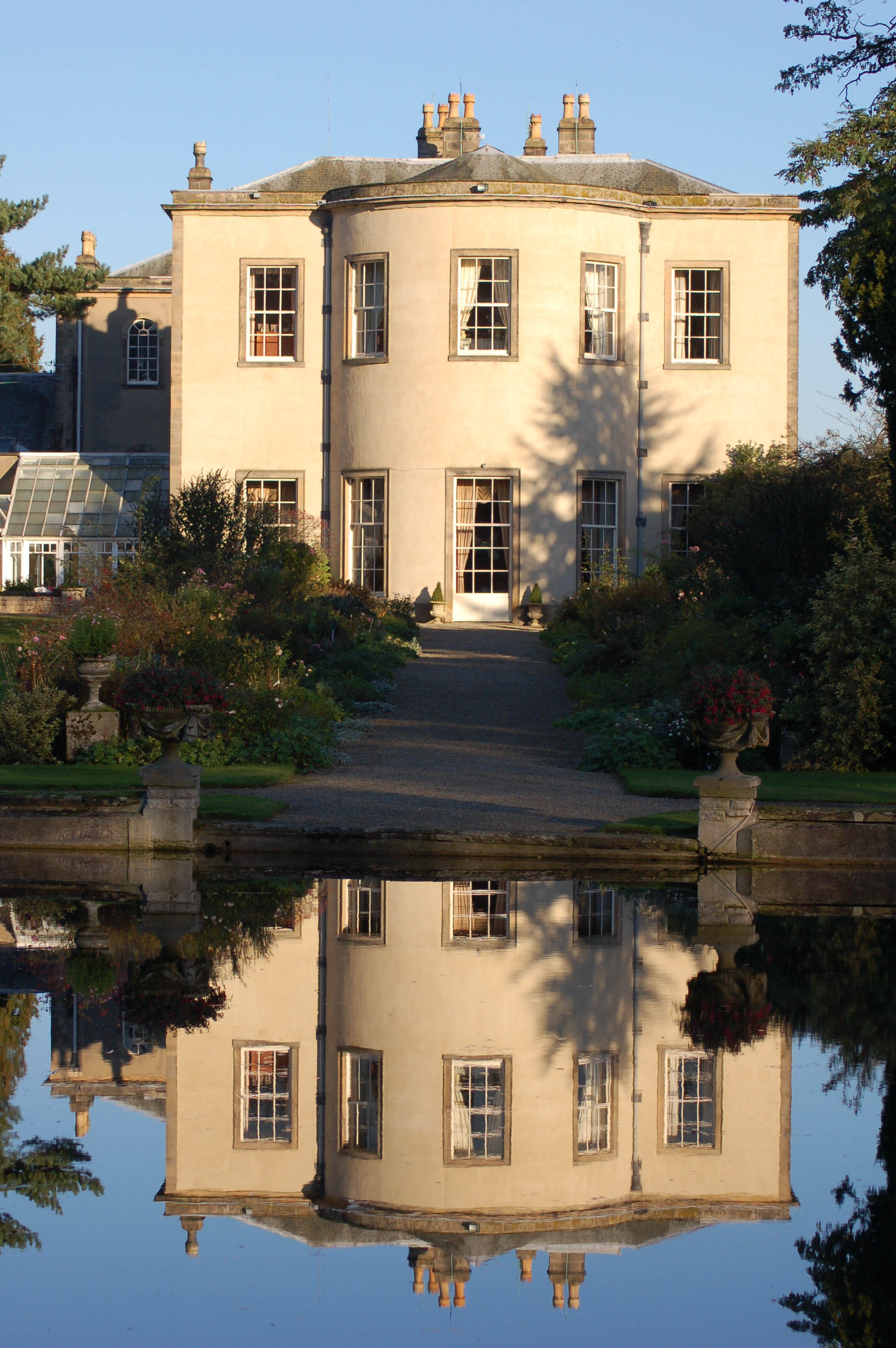
The building, in 2006

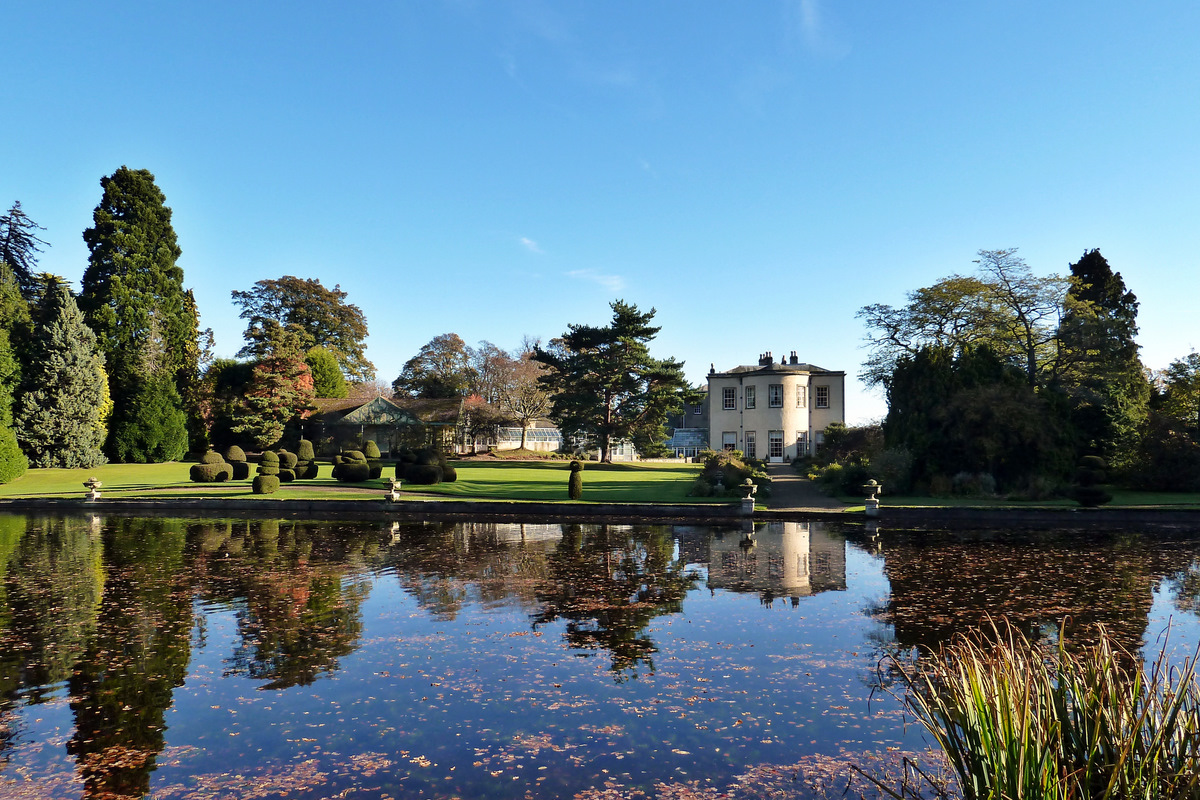

Thorp Perrow Hall is a historic building near Snape, North Yorkshire, a village in England.

The country house was built around 1715, on the site of an earlier manor house. The exterior was rebuilt in about 1800, to a design by John Foss. Walter Brierley undertook further work on the house in the early 20th century. The house has extensive grade II listed grounds, much of which now comprise Thorp Perrow Arboretum. The building was grade II* listed in 1966.

The house is built of rendered stone with a hipped stone slate roof. The main front has eleven bays, the middle nine with three storeys and the outer bays with two, and returns of five bays, the middle three bays bowed. To the rear right is a lower, single-storey wing. On the front is a porte cochère of two pillars and six fluted Ionic columns, and a doorway with pilasters and a moulded archivolt. Above it is a tripartite sash window with pilasters and columns carrying an entablature with a swagged frieze and a triangular pediment. The other windows are sashes in architraves, and on the outer bays are Venetian windows in arched recesses. Inside, there is early plasterwork in the ballroom, an early rear staircase, and original panelling and fireplaces in some of the bedrooms.

== See also ==
- Grade II* listed buildings in North Yorkshire (district)
- Listed buildings in Snape with Thorp
