= William Parry (spy) =

Welsh courtier and spy

William Parry (or Parrie) (died 2 March 1585) was a Welsh courtier and spy. He planned to assassinate Elizabeth I of England, and was executed for treason.

== Early life ==
He was the son of Harry ap David, a gentleman of Northop, Flintshire, and his wife Margaret, daughter of Pyrs or Peter Conway, Archdeacon of St Asaph and rector of Northop. Harry ap David, by his son's account, was in the guard to Henry VIII, and died about 1566, leaving fourteen children by his first wife and sixteen by his second, Parry's mother. Parry was originally named William ap Harry.

Parry was apprenticed to John Fisher of Chester, who had some legal knowledge; he attended a grammar school and made attempts to escape from his master. In about 1560 he went to London to seek his fortune. A marriage with a Mrs. Powell, widow, and daughter of Sir William Thomas, brought him some income.

In the household of William Herbert, 1st Earl of Pembroke until the Earl's death in 1570, Parry then entered the Queen's service. He appears to have found himself in financial difficulties, despite a second marriage to money.

== Spy ==
Parry sought a commission from Lord Burghley to spy on Catholics on the mainland of Europe, with the idea of escaping his creditors. On a first trip abroad he visited Rome, Siena, and other places. In 1577 he was back in England, though still short of money. In 1579 he left the country again abruptly; he wrote to Burghley from Paris excusing his conduct, and Burghley put Anthony Bacon in touch with him. Around this time Parry covertly joined the Roman Catholic Church.

In 1580 Parry again returned to England. In November, after renewed proceedings by his creditors, he made a personal assault on one of them, Hugh Hare, in the Inner Temple. Parry was convicted and sentenced to death. He received a pardon from the Queen. He found sureties for his debts, one of whom was Sir John Conway, a connection of his mother's.

On a third trip abroad in 1582, Parry appears to have become a double agent, going over to the Catholic side and considering Elizabeth's assassination. He began by urging a policy of conciliation towards Catholics in England, and recommending a pardon for some prominent Catholic refugees, including John and Thomas Roper, Sir Thomas Copley, and Charles Neville, 6th Earl of Westmorland. He then encountered Charles Paget and Thomas Morgan of Llantarnam, and read the works of Cardinal William Allen. He sought approval for an assassination scheme in various Catholic quarters, in France and Italy.

== Informant ==
On his return to England in 1584, Parry disclosed some of his dealings to the Queen, claiming to have acted only to cover Protestant plots. She pardoned him; Parry started to demand rewards. The Queen pensioned him, and rewarded him with a seat in Parliament for Queenborough. Parry was at this point playing a double game. He tried the effect of a protest in parliament against the treatment of Catholics.

However, Parry was still unable to pay off his debts, and attempted to manufacture another plot to be "discovered". He approached Sir Edmund Neville and suggested to him that they should ride up and shoot the Queen in her coach, or kill her during a private audience. According to some accounts, Parry did attempt to carry out the assassination but lost his courage before he could do the deed. However, it is unclear whether he genuinely intended to kill the Queen, or to raise his own standing by "exposing" Neville.

Parliament met on 23 November, and one of its first acts was to debate a bill against Jesuits and seminary priests. On its third reading (17 December), Parry denounced it; he was committed to the sergeant-at-arms, placed on his knees at the bar, and required to explain his words. He was carried off in custody and examined by the privy council. The next day he was released by an order from the Queen.

Six weeks later Neville informed against his fellow conspirator, stating that he had plotted to murder the Queen while she was driving in the park. Parry was arrested on a charge of high treason, and placed in the Tower of London. He wrote a full confession to the Queen, and sent letters to Burghley and the Earl of Leicester.

== Death ==
On 11 February 1585 Parry was expelled from Parliament. Parry was taken to the Tower of London and made a confession on 13 February. On 18 February his trial began in Westminster Hall. Perhaps in the hope of pardon, he pleaded guilty, but he subsequently declared his innocence, said that his confession was a tissue of falsehoods, and that Tolomeo Gallio, the former Archbishop of Manfredonia, had never given any countenance to the murder. He was condemned to death by being hanged, drawn and quartered, and was executed on 2 March 1585 in Westminster Palace Yard. On the scaffold, he again declared his innocence and appealed to the Queen for a more lenient treatment of her Catholic subjects.

Claude de Courcelles, the secretary of the French ambassador in London, Michel de Castelnau, was alleged to have carried letters to Parry. This led to suspicion of the involvement of Mary, Queen of Scots.

After Parry's death a work, published, probably, at the instance of the government, and entitled A true and plain Declaration of the Horrible Treasons practised by William Parry, charged him with various atrocious crimes. It also made remarks on his birth and parentage.

== Epigram ==
An epigram on his death, quoted by Holinshed, was reproduced in The Worm Ouroboros:

It was pittie
One so wittie
Malcontent:
Leaving reason
Should to treason
So be bent.
But his gifts
Were but shifts
Void of grace:
And his braverie
Was but knaverie
Vile and base.
