= Listed buildings in Well, North Yorkshire =

Well is a civil parish in the county of North Yorkshire, England. It contains 13 listed buildings that are recorded in the National Heritage List for England. Of these, two are listed at Grade I, the highest of the three grades, and the others are at Grade II, the lowest grade. The parish contains the village of Well and the surrounding countryside. The listed buildings consist of houses and associated structures, a church and items in the churchyard, farmhouses and farm buildings, a row of almshouses, and a telephone kiosk.

== Key ==
Grade	Criteria
I	Buildings of exceptional interest, sometimes considered to be internationally important
II	Buildings of national importance and special interest

== Buildings ==
Name and location	Photograph	Date	Notes	Grade
St Michael's Church; 54.23354°N 1.59018°W		12th century	The church has been altered and extended through the centuries, including a restoration in 1854. It is built in stone with roofs of stone slate and lead, and consists of a nave with a clerestory, north and south aisles, a south porch, a chancel with a south aisle and a small north aisle with a vestry, and a west tower. The tower has four stages, the tall bottom stage dating from the 12th century. There is a small lean-to stair turret on the north side, and the tower contains small single-light openings, a west window, bands, clock faces, paired bell openings, and an embattled parapet. The porch is gabled, and contains a doorway with a pointed arch and a moulded surround. The inner doorway dates from the 12th century, and has a round arch, with three orders of colonnettes, waterleaf capitals, and roll-moulding.	I
The Hall; 54.23317°N 1.59088°W		13th century	The house has been altered and extended through the centuries. The oldest part is a vaulted four-bay undercroft in the north wing. The house has a T-shaped plan, with three storeys, the older part with fronts of two and three bays, and to the right is a recessed 18th-century range with four bays. The house is built in stone with quoins and a stone slate roof. The windows are sashes, some horizontally sliding.	I
Churchyard cross 54.23347°N 1.58989°W		Medieval	The cross in the churchyard of St Michael's Church, to the south of the church, is in stone. It consists of a tall square shaft about 3 metres (9.8 ft) in height, on a square plinth, on three square steps.	II
Old School House; 54.23415°N 1.58661°W		1722	The house is in rendered brick and stone, with a pantile roof. There are two storeys and two bays, and a lean-to on the right with a slate roof. In the centre is a gabled porch, and the windows are sashes. Inside there is an inglenook fireplace.	II
Barn west of The Hall; 54.23286°N 1.59157°W	—	18th century	The barn is in stone, with quoins, and a pantile roof with stone coping to the east gable. It is about 75 metres (246 ft) in length, and has blocked openings on the garden side and 19th-century openings on the other side.	II
Stable, granary and pigeoncote, The Hall; 54.23308°N 1.59121°W	—	Mid-18th century	The building is in stone, and has a pantile roof with shaped kneelers to the gables. There are two storeys and five bays. The middle bay is gabled, and contains a doorway with a moulded archivolt and a keystone, and above is a blind round-arched opening with two rows of pigeon nesting holes. The outer bays contain casement windows and blocked openings. At the rear are steps to the upper floor granary.	II
St Michael's Cottages and Chapel; 54.23317°N 1.59033°W		1758	A row of four almshouses with a chapel at the south end. They are in stone and have a Welsh slate roof with stone coping. Each cottage has two storeys and three bays, and the chapel has two bays. All the cottages have a central doorway with chamfered jambs, and two-light windows with stone surrounds and moulded mullions. On the front are two coats of arms, and a water pump with a datestone above. The chapel has a central doorway with a pointed arch, a moulded surround and moulded imposts, and it is flanked by two-light mullioned windows with round-headed lights.	II
Tomb west of St Michael's Church; 54.23355°N 1.59049°W		Late 18th century	The tomb has a stone rear wall containing a central plaque with a surround of pilasters, a sill and a cornice, and above it is a pediment with a small cartouche and an inscription. In front is a rectangular railed enclosure, the wrought iron railings with spearhead finials on a low stone wall. At the rear wall ends are pilasters, at the front corners are Doric columns with urns on cornices, and in the centre are double gates.	II
Gate piers and garden wall, The Hall; 54.23279°N 1.59099°W	—	Late 18th century	The two gate piers are in rusticated stone. Each pier has a moulded band, a ramped frieze, a moulded cornice, and a tapering stem for a missing ball finial. They are flanked by stone walls 6 feet (1.8 m) in height.	II
Holly Hill; 54.23134°N 1.59814°W	—	Early 19th century	The house is in rendered stone, with an embattled parapet at the front, and a stone slate roof. There are three storeys and three bays. In the centre is a porch with moulded jambs, a frieze, a dentilled cornice and a pediment, and a door with a three-pane fanlight. The windows on the lower two floors are sashes, and on the upper floor are blocked openings painted to resemble sash windows.	II
Mowbray Hill Farmhouse; 54.22549°N 1.60155°W	—	Early 19th century	The farmhouse is in stone, with a moulded gutter on double brackets, and a hipped slate roof. There are three storeys and three bays. In the centre is a doorway with a Doric surround, columns, imposts, a fanlight and a broken pediment. The windows are sashes with flush lintels.	II
Farm buildings southwest of Mowbray Hill Farmhouse; 54.22522°N 1.60217°W	—	Early 19th century	The farm buildings are in stone, and have roofs of stone slate and corrugated asbestos. There are two ranges at right angles forming an L-shaped plan. Each range has nine bays, the middle three bays with two storeys and a pyramidal roof, and the outer bays with one storey and hipped roofs. The openings have segmental stone arches, and contain stable doors and casement windows.	II
Telephone kiosk 54.23251°N 1.59177°W		1935	The telephone kiosk on the north side of Church Street is of the K6 type designed by Giles Gilbert Scott. Constructed in cast iron with a square plan and a dome, it has three unperforated crowns in the top panels.	II
