= Robert Willoughby, 2nd Baron Willoughby de Broke =

English nobleman and soldier

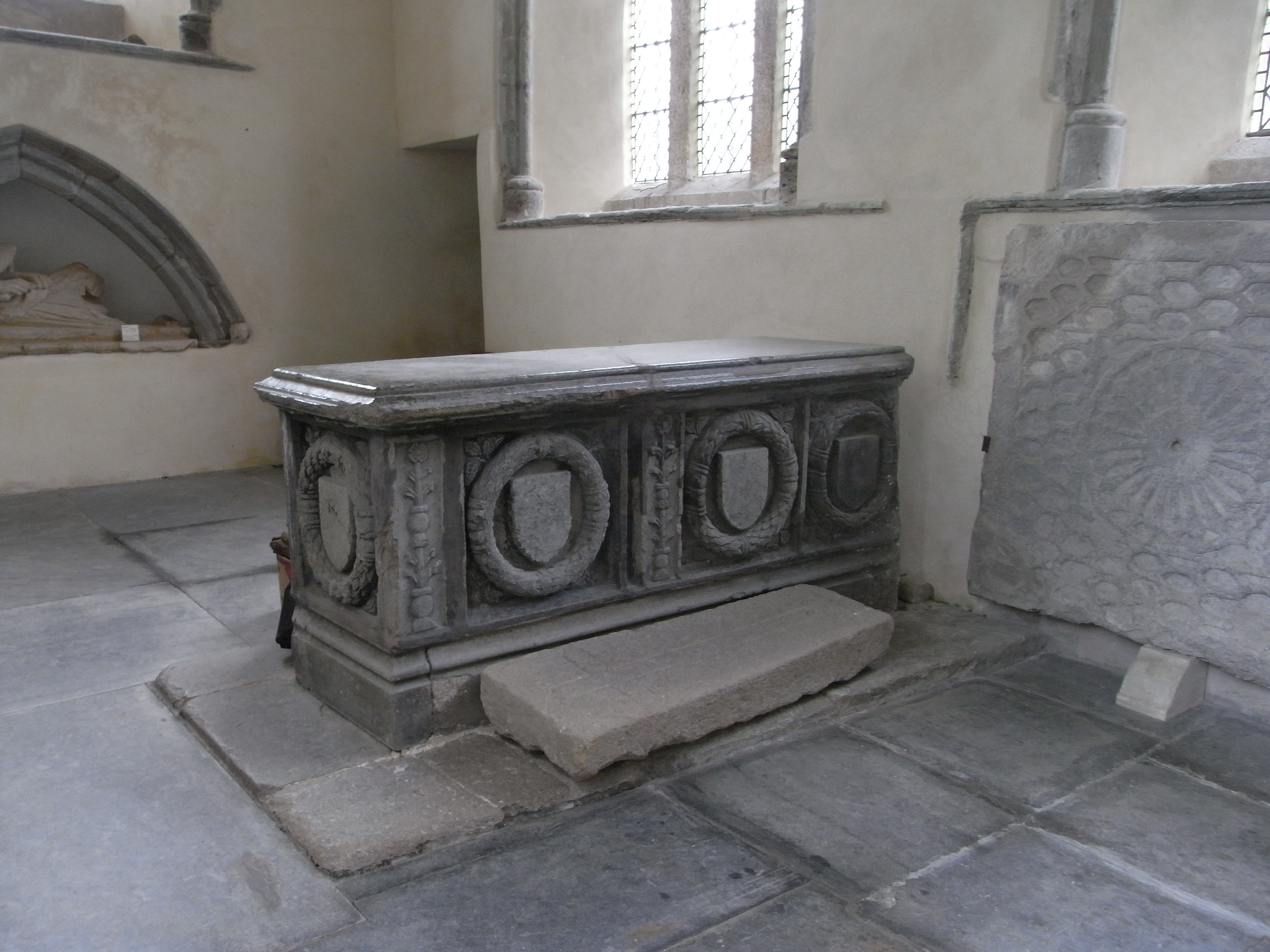
Chest tomb c. 1530 presumed to be that of Robert Willougby, 2nd Baron Willoughby de Broke, north transept, St.Andrew's Church, Bere Ferrers, Devon. Viewed from SW

Drawing of Willoughby tomb at Bere Ferrers, viewed from north-west, by Roscoe Gibbs, 19th century. The tomb is of purbeck marble, the cover stone is plain but is indented in a channel around the top edge where formerly existed a brass inscribed ledger line. The flat escutcheons on the chest, encircled by classical wreaths and separated by renaissance grotto-esque candelabra-like standards, are now devoid of their original heraldic charges, thought to have been engraved on brass affixed thereon.

Robert Willoughby, 2nd Baron Willoughby de Broke and de jure 10th Baron Latimer, KB (1472 – 10 November 1521) was an English nobleman and soldier.

Robert Willoughby was born about 1470–1472 (aged 30 in 1502, 36 in 1506), the son of Sir Robert Willoughby, 1st Baron Willoughby de Broke (c. 1452–1502) and Blanche Champernowne. He married firstly before 28 Feb. 1494/95, to Elizabeth Beauchamp, daughter of Richard Beauchamp, 2nd Baron Beauchamp of Powick and Elizabeth Stafford, daughter of Sir Humphrey Stafford, of Grafton; secondly, c. 1509, to Lady Dorothy Grey, daughter of Thomas Grey, 1st Marquess of Dorset and Cecily Bonville, 7th Baroness Harington.

He was knighted before 1504. He served in the army in France in 1513, and was apparently to be present at the Field of the Cloth of Gold in June 1520.

He inherited the title 2nd Baron Willoughby de Broke and 10th Baron Latimer on the death of his father in 1502, will proved.

On his death, on 10 November 1521 at Bere Ferrers in Devon the title went into abeyance. His widow, Dorothy, married (2nd) before 29 July 1523 as his fourth wife, William Blount, 4th Baron Mountjoy.

By his first wife he had two sons, Edward, Esq. (died 1517) and Sir Anthony, Kt., and by the second wife 6 children, including sons Henry and William, and daughters Elizabeth, who married John Paulet, 2nd Marquess of Winchester, and Anne, who married Charles Blount, 5th Baron Mountjoy.

== Family ==
First marriage of Sir Robert Willoughby, '1st Baron Willoughby de Broke', 28 February 1494/95 to Elizabeth Beauchamp, of Grafton, produced two sons.

- Edward Willoughby, Esq., of Alcester and Powick (died November 1517), married Margaret Neville, daughter of Richard Neville, 2nd Baron Latimer, and Anne Stafford, father of Elizabeth, Anne and Blanche
- Sir Anthony Willoughby, Kt.

His second marriage to Dorothy Grey, who would become Baroness Mountjoy during her lifetime through her second marriage to William Blount, '4th Baron Mountjoy they had the following children:

- Henry Willoughby
- William Willoughby
- Elizabeth Willoughby, married John Paulet, 2nd Marquess of Winchester
- Anne Willoughby, married Charles Blount, 5th Baron Mountjoy

== Notes ==
Peerage of England
Preceded by Robert Willoughby	Baron Willoughby de Broke; 1502–1521	Succeeded by Elizabeth Verney nee Willoughby
