= William Bourchier, 1st Count of Eu =

English knight, 1st Count of Eu (1375–1420)

Canting arms of Bourchier: Argent, a cross engrailed gules between four water bougets sable

William Bourchier, 1st Count of Eu (2 March 1375 – 28 May 1420), was an English knight created by King Henry V 1st Count of Eu, in Normandy.

== Life ==
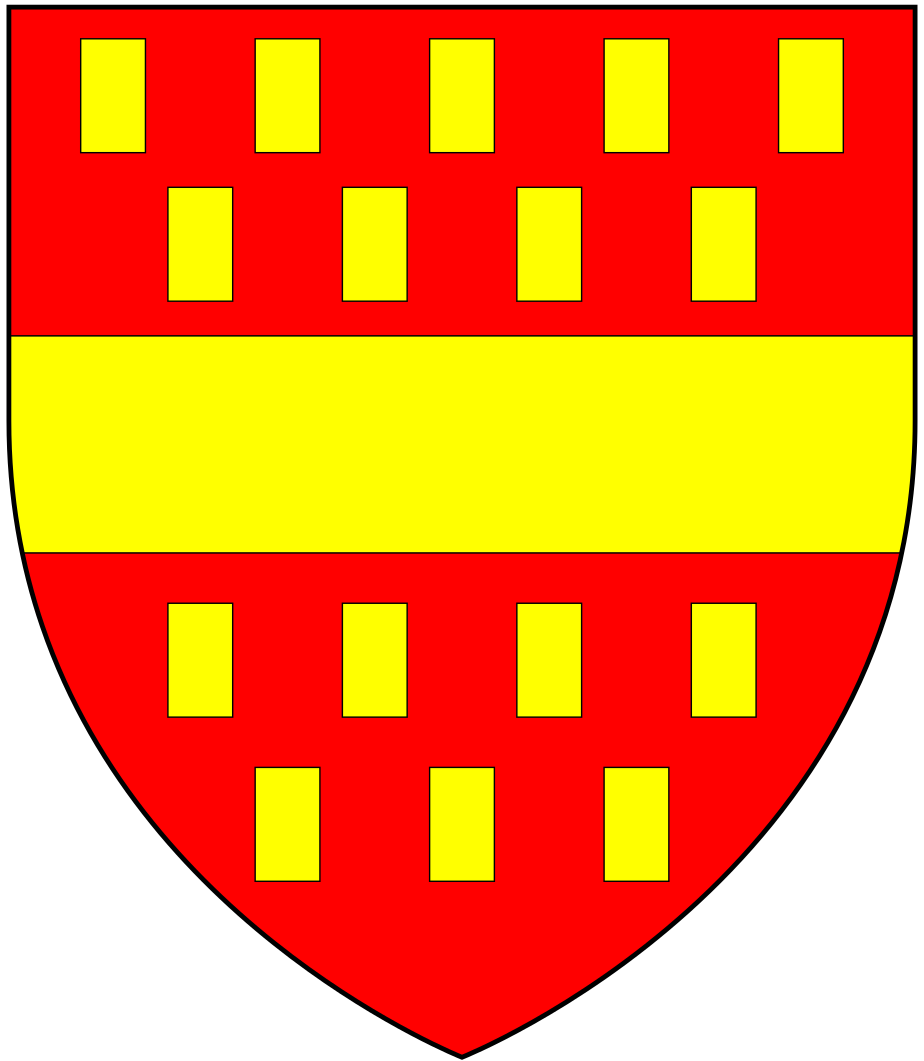
Arms of Louvain of Little Easton: Gules billety or a fess of the last

William was born 2 March 1375, the son of Sir William Bourchier and Eleanor de Louvain, daughter and heiress of Sir John de Louvain, feudal baron of Little Easton in Essex.

== Career ==
William fought at the Battle of Agincourt in 1415. In 1417 he was in the retinue of King Henry V during his second expedition to France, and played a significant role in the capture of Normandy. In 1419, William was appointed Captain of Dieppe and was granted powers to receive the submission of the town and Comté of Eu. The French count of Eu had refused to pay homage to King Henry V of England and thus had been held prisoner in England since Agincourt. In June 1419, Henry V awarded six captured French counties to his more significant English supporters, and the County of Eu was granted to William Bourchier, thus making him 1st Count of Eu.

== Marriage and children ==
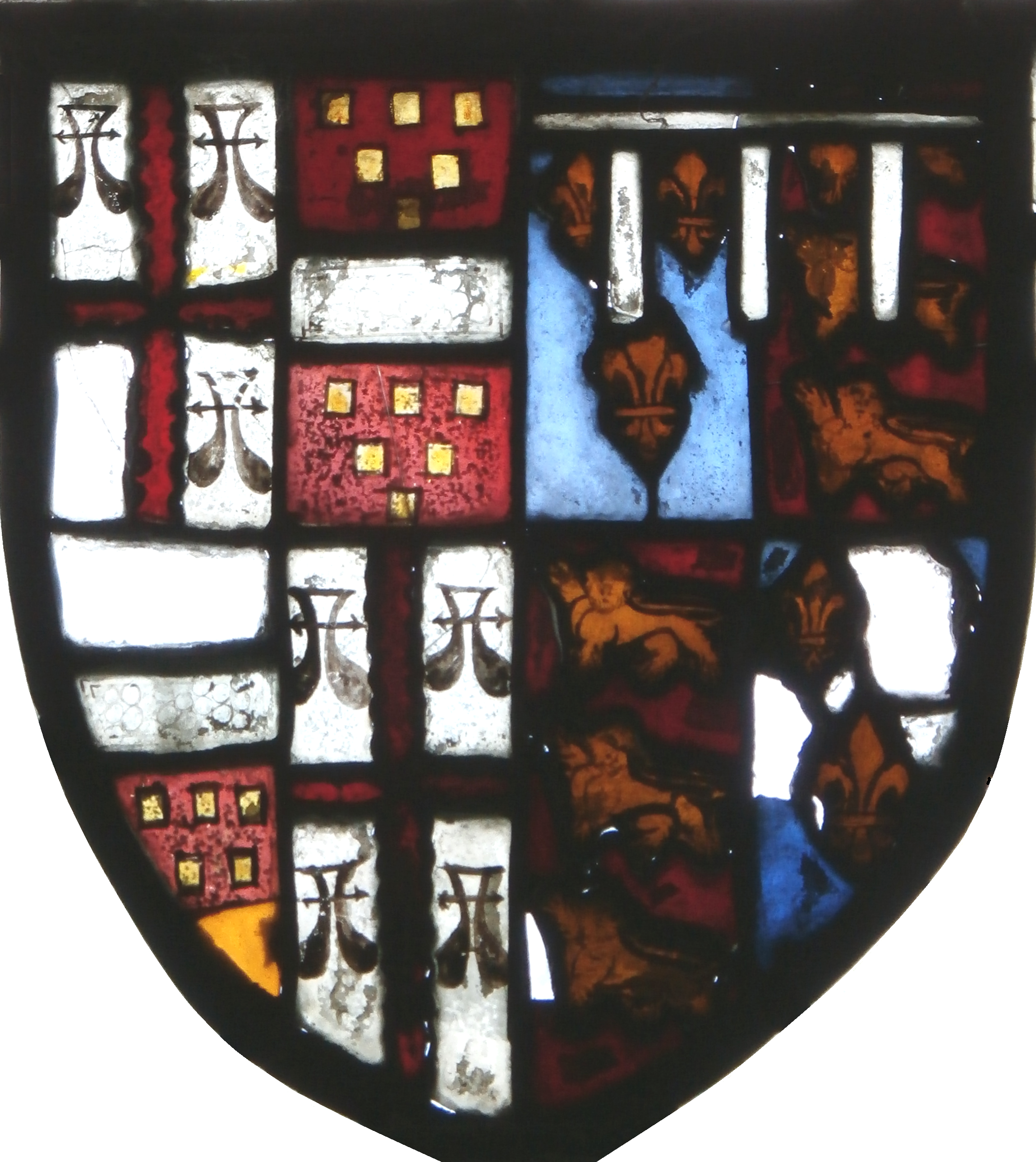
Arms of William Bourchier, 1st Count of Eu (1374–1420) (Quarterly Bourchier and Lovain, feudal barons of Little Easton, Essex) impaling arms of his father-in-law Thomas of Woodstock, 1st Duke of Gloucester (1355–1397), youngest son of King Edward III (Royal Arms of England, a label of three points argent for difference). Stained glass, west window, Tawstock Church, Devon. The Count's son William Bourchier, 9th Baron FitzWarin (1407–1470) was the first to be connected with the manor of Tawstock, having married the heiress of that manor

William married Anne of Gloucester, Countess of Stafford, daughter of the Plantagenet prince Thomas of Woodstock, 1st Duke of Gloucester (1355–1397). The Wrey baronets, who were the heirs of the Bourchier Earls of Bath, quartered the arms of Wrey with the arms of Bourchier and Bohun, and the Royal Arms of England. They had the following children:

- Henry Bourchier, 1st Earl of Essex (1404 – 4 April 1483)
- William Bourchier, (25 October 1415 – 1474), jure uxoris 9th Baron FitzWarin
- John Bourchier, 1st Baron Berners, (c. 1416 – 16 May 1474)
- Thomas Bourchier, (c. 1418 – 30 March 1486), Archbishop of Canterbury and cardinal
- Eleanor Bourchier, (c. 1417 – November, 1474), wife of John de Mowbray, 3rd Duke of Norfolk.

== Death and burial ==
William died at Troyes, France on 28 May 1420 and was buried at Llanthony Secunda Priory, Gloucester.

== Ancestry ==
Ancestors of William Bourchier, 1st Count of Eu

8. John de Bourchier
4. Robert Bourchier, 1st Baron Bourchier
18. Walter of Colchester
9. Helen Colchester
19. Joan/Helen de Mountchensy
2. Sir William Bourchier
20. Richard de Praers
10. Thomas Prayers
21. Johanna Crewe
5. Margaret Prayers
22. Hugh of Essex
11. Margaret de Essex
23. ??
1. William Bourchier, 1st Count of Eu
24. Matthew II de Lovaine
12. Thomas de Louvaine
25. Maud Louvain Poyntz
6. Sir John de Louvaine
26. Robert De Basing
13. Joan de Basing
27. Margery de Basing
3. Alianore de Lovayne
14. Sir Thomas Weston
7. Margaret Weston
15. ??

== Sources ==
- Arkenburg, Jerome S. (2001). "Bouchier, Thomas (1411-86)". In Drees, Clayton J. (ed.). The Late Medieval Age of Crisis and Renewal, 1300-1500. Greenwood Press. ISBN 0-313-30588-9.
- Ashdown-Hill, John (2019). Elizabeth Widville, Lady Grey: Edward IV's Chief Mistress and the 'Pink Queen'. Pen and Sword. ISBN 978-1-52674-501-9.
- Woodger, L.S., biography of Sir William Bourchier, published in The History of Parliament: House of Commons 1386-1421, ed. J.S. Roskell, L. Clark, C. Rawcliffe, 1993
