= Thorp Perrow Arboretum =

Arboretum in North Yorkshire, England

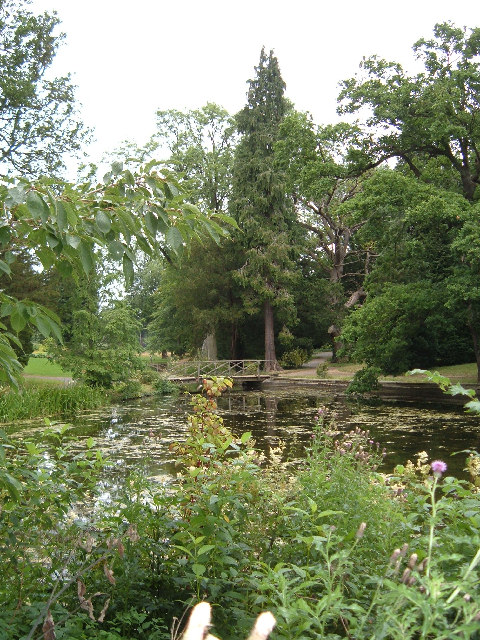
- Thorp Perrow Arboretum

- Location within North Yorkshire
- Type: Arboretum
- Location: Bedale, North Yorkshire
- Coordinates: 54°15′55″N 1°35′55″W
- Area: 100 acres (40 ha)
- Created: 1931
- Operator: Thorp Perrow Estate

Thorp Perrow Arboretum is an 85-acre (34 ha) woodland garden arboretum near Bedale in North Yorkshire, England.

== History ==
Thorp is a common place-name of Old Norse origin meaning hamlet or small village. In the Domesday Book of 1086 Thorp was a possession of Count Alan of Brittany. Perrow derives from the lords of the manor of Pirnhow (also written Pirhou or Pirho) in Norfolk, who were the earliest known tenants here. In 1286-87 Helewise de Perrow was a tenant.

There is no surviving record of a village at Thorp Perrow. A park called Thorpe Park went with the manor of Thorp Perrow in the 16th and 17th centuries. Spring Wood was planted in the 16th century, and survives to this day. Thorp Perrow Hall was built in the early 18th century. Ornamental gardens and lakes were laid out around 1800, and a collection of exotic conifers called Milbank Pinetum was planted between 1840 and 1870 by Lady Augusta Milbank.

The Arboretum was originally created by Colonel Sir Leonard Ropner (1895–1977) in 1931. Leonard Ropner also founded several gardens in the park. Today the Thorp Perrow estate is considered to be one of the finest arboreta in the United Kingdom; The Times listed it as one of the top ten.

In July 2006 the gardens celebrated their 75th anniversary by planting the 1,750th tree.

== The arboretum today ==
Thorp Perrow is now open to the public. It holds five National Plant Collections: Tilia (Lime), Fraxinus (Ash), Cotinus (Smoke Bush), Laburnum and Juglans (Walnut), and has 48 Champion Trees in its collection. It also contains a Birds of Prey Centre, with regular flying demonstrations.

== See also ==
- Snape, North Yorkshire § Thorp Perrow
