= Robert Willoughby, 1st Baron Willoughby de Broke =

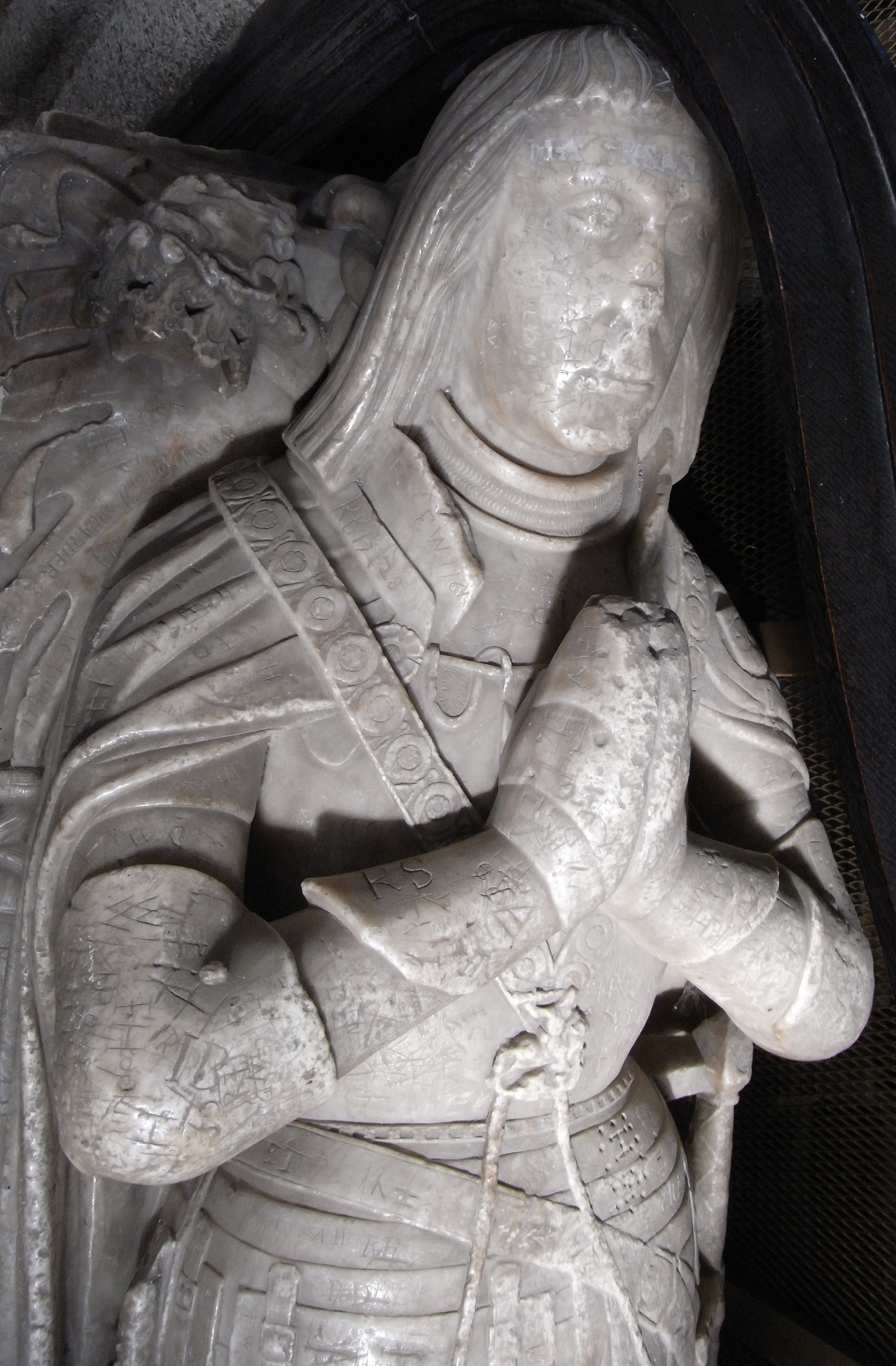
Effigy of Robert Willoughby, 1st Baron Willoughby de Broke (d. 1502), alabaster, St Mary's Church, Callington, Cornwall

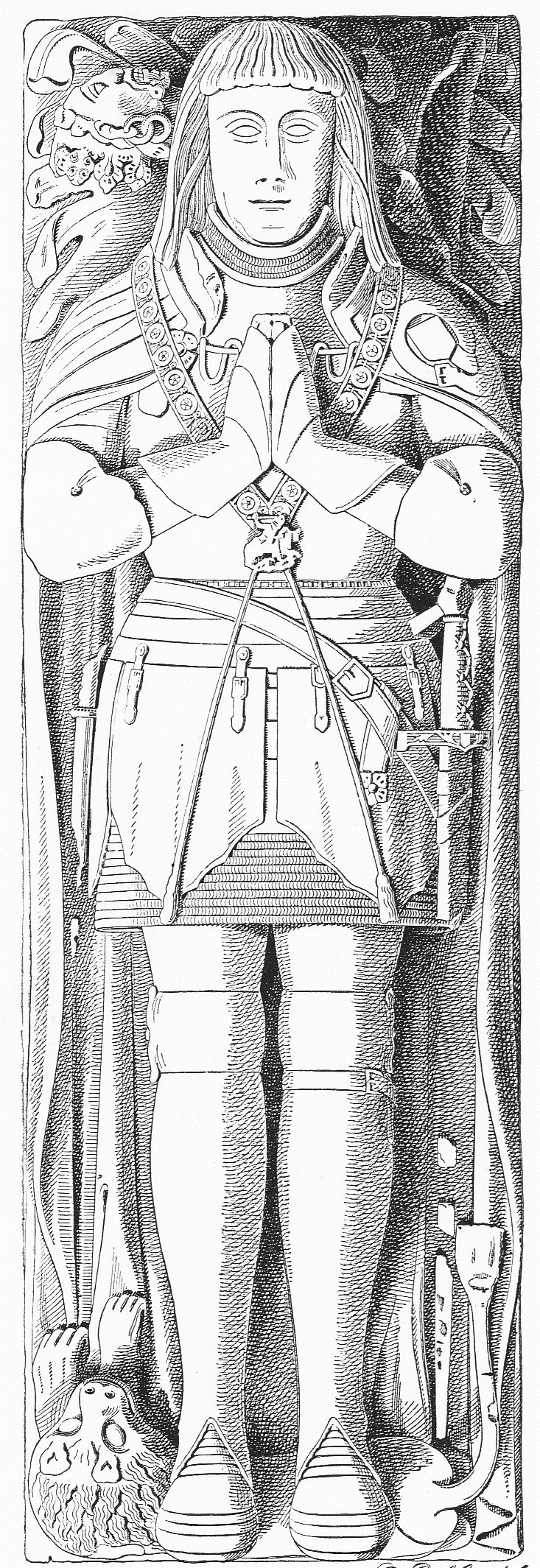
19th-century drawings of monumental effigy of Robert Willoughby, Callington Church, Cornwall. He wears the collar of the Order of the Garter and his head rests on the crest of Willoughby a Saracen's head, couped at the shoulders, ducally crowned, and with earrings

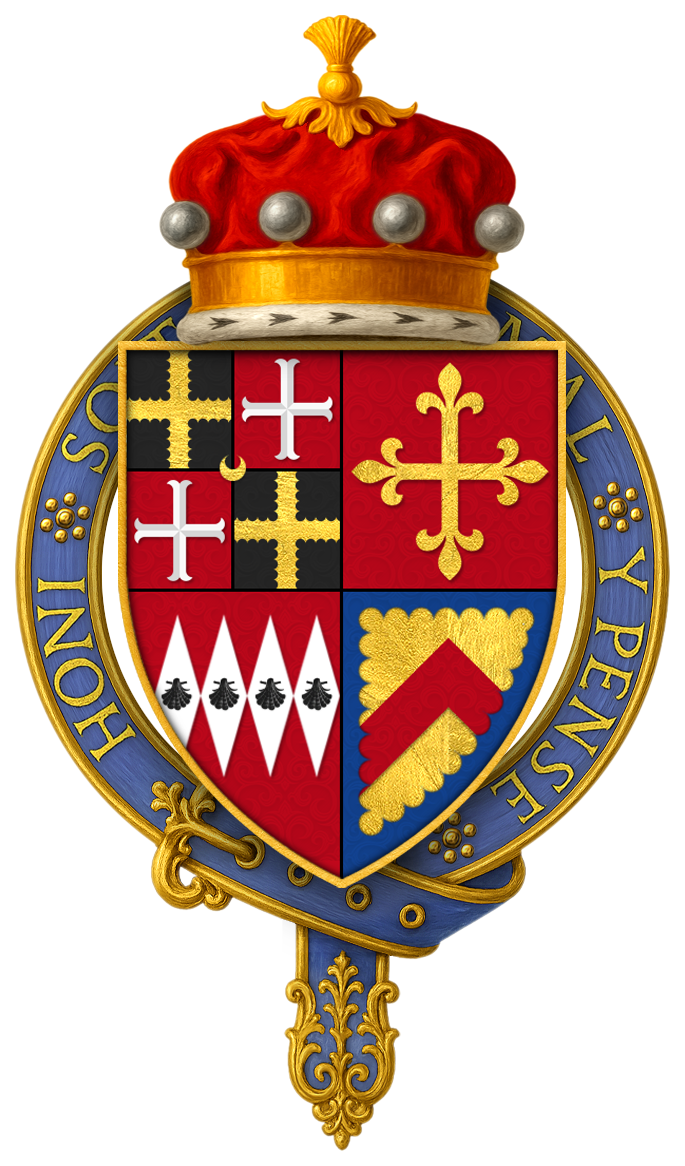
Arms of Sir Robert Willoughby, 1st Baron Willoughby de Broke, KG on his Garter stall plate

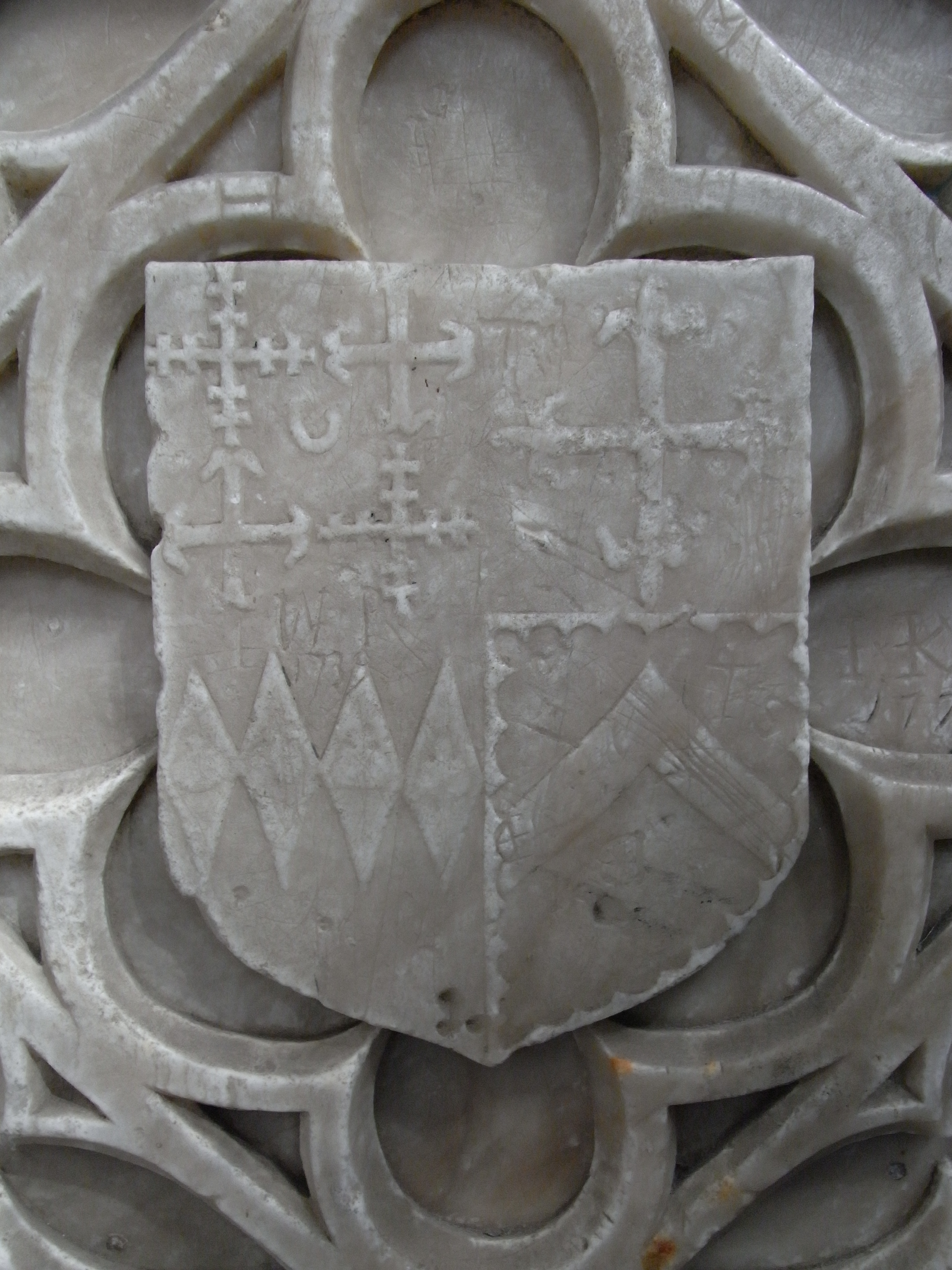
One of six similar Escutcheons of Robert Willoughby, some shown within the cordon of the Order of the Garter, on his tomb at Callington, blazoned: Quarterly, 1st grand quarter quarterly, 1st and 4th a cross crosslet double crossed 2nd and 3rd a cross moline; a crescent superimposed on the fess-point for difference; (Willoughby) 2nd grand quarter, a cross fleurie (Latimer) 3rd grand quarter, 4 fusils in fess each charged with an escallop (Cheyne) 4th grand quarter, a chevron within a bordure engrailled (Stafford)

Robert Willoughby, 1st Baron Willoughby de Broke, de jure 9th Baron Latimer (c. 1452 – 23 August 1502), KG, of Brook, near Westbury, Wiltshire, was one of the chief commanders of the royal forces of King Henry VII against the Cornish rebellion of 1497.

== Origins ==
Born about 1452 at Brook, then written "Broke", in the parish of Westbury in Wiltshire, he was the eldest son of Sir John Willoughby (1421–1477). His mother was Anne Cheyne, second daughter and co-heiress of Sir Edmund Cheyne (1401–1430) of Brook, by his wife Alice Stafford, only daughter and eventual heiress of Sir Humphrey Stafford (c.1379–1442) "With the Silver Hand", of Hooke, Dorset, and of Southwick, North Bradley, Wiltshire, and an aunt of Humphrey Stafford, 1st Earl of Devon (d. 1469). The de Cheney (also known as Chesney or Cheyne) family holds a significant place in the history of the Channel Islands. They emerged as prominent figures in governance and were among the most substantial landowners after the Crown. Edmund de Cheney served as the governor of both Guernsey and Jersey in 1360. Prior to that, Nicholas de Cheney had been appointed as the Warden of the Islands in 1297. The de Cheney family also owned extensive lands in Guernsey, including the Fief of Anneville, recognized in Guernsey tradition as the oldest fief. Through the seigneury of this fief, the de Cheney family held feudal rights over more than a quarter of the island and were de jure members of the Royal Court of Chief Pleas, the then governing body of the island. The fief of Anneville had been purchased by Guillaume de Chesney in 1248. Robert Willoughby inherited it in right of his mother. Sir Edmund was the son and heir of William Cheyne (c.1374–1420) by his wife Cecily Strecche (d.1443); William was the son of Sir Ralph Cheyne (c.1337–1400) of Poyntington in Somerset, and of Brook (three times Member of Parliament for Wiltshire, Deputy Justiciar of Ireland, Lord Chancellor of Ireland, and Deputy Warden of the Cinque Ports) by his wife Joan Pavely, daughter and co-heiress of Sir John Pavely of Brook.

== Career ==
He was High Sheriff of Cornwall in 1479 and High Sheriff of Devon in 1480. He was Lord of the Manor of Callington and steward of the Duchy of Cornwall.

He was involved in the Buckingham Rebellion in 1483 and, after its failure, fled to Brittany to join Henry Tudor. He later fought with Henry at Bosworth.

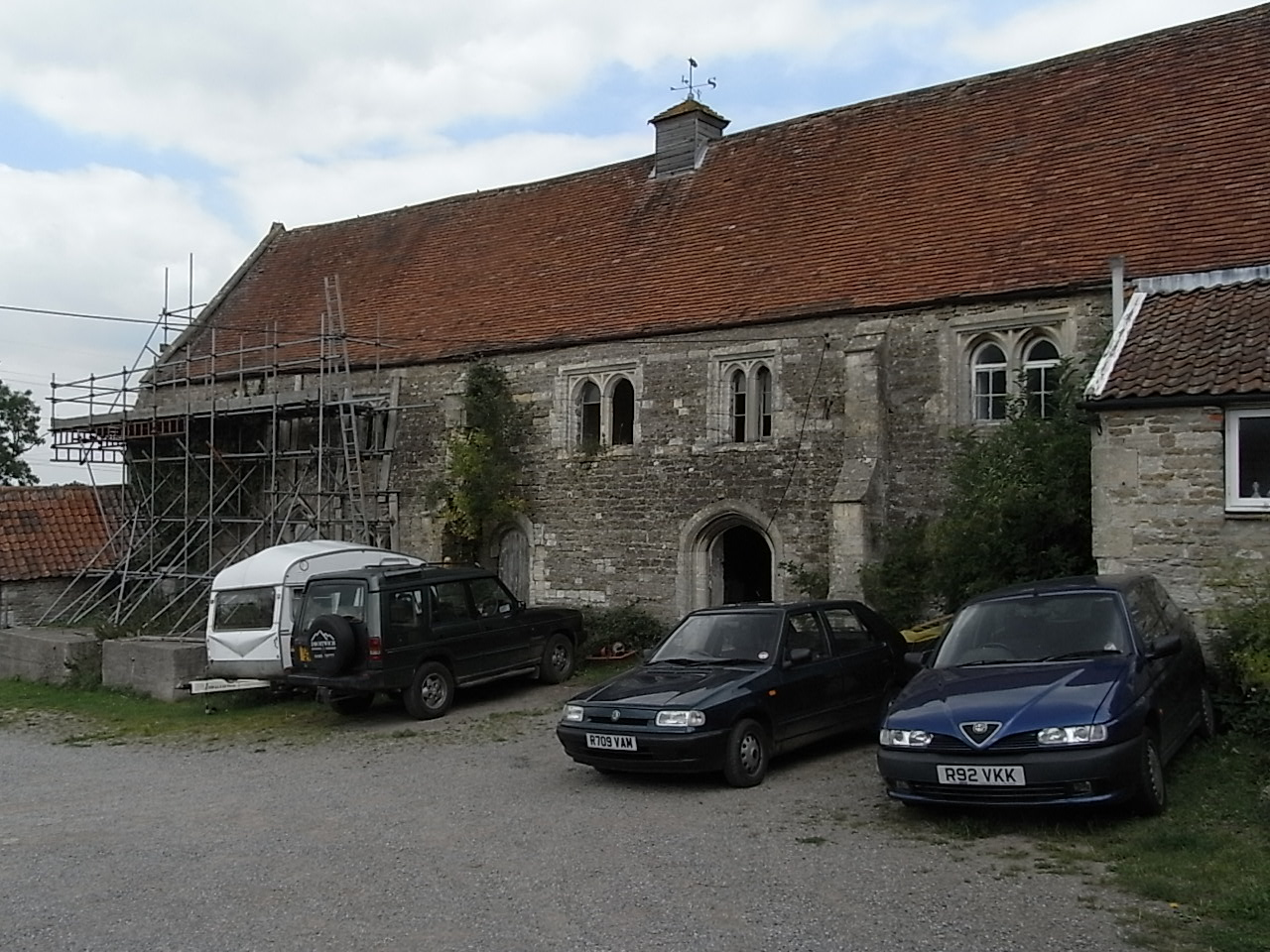
Mediaeval wing of Brook Hall, 2011, remnant of the manor house built by Robert Willoughby

The barony of Willoughby de Broke, named after the manor of Brook, Westbury, Wiltshire, was created when Robert Willoughby was summoned to Parliament by writ in 1492. On his death on 23 August 1502, the title passed to his eldest son Robert Willoughby, 2nd Baron Willoughby de Broke. He died at the manor house of Callington, for he directed in his will that he should be buried in the church of the parish he died in.

== Marriage and children ==
He married in 1472 Blanche Champernowne, daughter and heiress of John Champernowne of Bere Ferrers, Devon, by Elizabeth Bigbury. John was the son of Alexander Champernowne of Modbury and Joan Ferrers, daughter of Martyn Ferrers of Bere Ferrers. He thus acquired the manors of Callington, Cornwall and Bere Ferrers, amongst others.

He had four children with Blanche:

- Robert Willoughby, 2nd Baron Willoughby de Broke (d. 1521). Predeceased by his son and heir Edward, whereupon the title became abeyant in 1521 between Edward's three daughters and was terminated around 1535, when daughter Elizabeth became sole heiress. Buried at Bere Ferrers.
- Elizabeth, who married firstly John Dynham, 1st Baron Dynham, and secondly William FitzAlan, 18th Earl of Arundel.
- John (died young)
- Anthony (died young)

== Sources ==
- Hamilton Rogers, W.H., The Strife of the Roses & Days of the Tudors in the West, Exeter, 1890, "Our Steward of Household", Robert, Lord Willoughby de Broke, K.G., pp. 1–37 online text, freefictionbooks; online text, with images, Project Gutenburg. Although Hamilton Rogers claims that de Broke was Steward of the Duchy of Cornwall, he may have confused him with his son, the 2nd Baron Robert Willoughby de Broke, who was Lord Steward and Lord Warden of the Stannaries in Cornwall and Devon: see list of Lord Wardens of the Stannaries.

Political offices
Preceded by William Carnesew	Undersheriff of Cornwall; 1478–1479	Succeeded by Richard Nanfan
Preceded by Halnatheus Maleverer	High Sheriff of Devon; 1480–1481	Succeeded by Sir Giles Daubeney
Preceded by Sir Richard Edgcumbe	High Sheriff of Devon; 1487–1488	Succeeded by Roger Holland
Preceded by The Lord FitzWalter	Lord Steward; 1488–1502	Succeeded by The Earl of Shrewsbury
Peerage of England
New creation	Baron Willoughby de Broke; 1492–1502	Succeeded by Robert Willoughby
