= Snape, North Yorkshire =

Village in North Yorkshire, England

Coordinates: 54°15′15″N 1°35′30″W

Snape
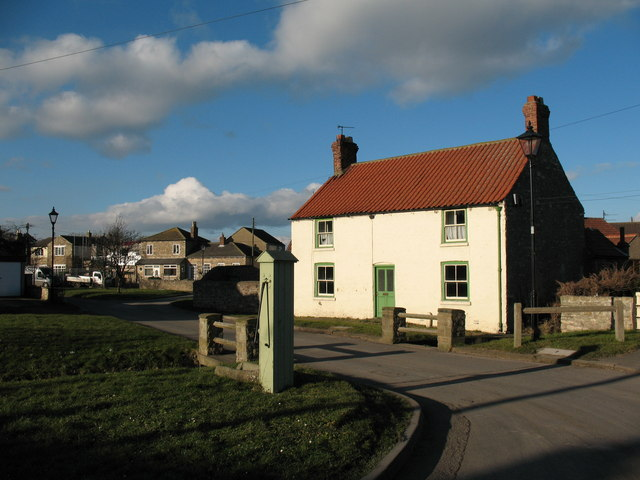
- Snape village pump

- Location within North Yorkshire
- OS grid reference: SE268842
- Civil parish: Snape with Thorp
- Unitary authority: North Yorkshire
- Ceremonial county: North Yorkshire
- Region: Yorkshire and the Humber
- Country: England
- Sovereign state: United Kingdom
- Police: North Yorkshire
- Fire: North Yorkshire
- Ambulance: Yorkshire
- UK Parliament: Thirsk and Malton

Snape is a large village in the civil parish of Snape with Thorp in the county of North Yorkshire, England, located about 3 miles (5 km) south of Bedale and 3 miles (5 km) west of the A1(M) motorway, it has a population of 350. Nearby is Thorp Perrow Arboretum. The name is Old Norse for a boggy tract of uncultivated land.

From 1974 to 2023 it was part of the Hambleton District, it is now administered by the unitary North Yorkshire Council.

== History ==
The village has many historic connections. It was the site of a Roman villa, and had a connection to the mother and wife of Richard III. Snape Castle was the residence of Katherine Parr and her husband, John Neville, 3rd Baron Latimer, before she became the sixth wife of King Henry VIII. It also had an involvement in the Pilgrimage of Grace in 1536, when Katherine Parr and her step-children were held captive at the castle.

Prior to the mid-19th century, Snape was a centre for the woolcombing trade.

== Snape Castle ==
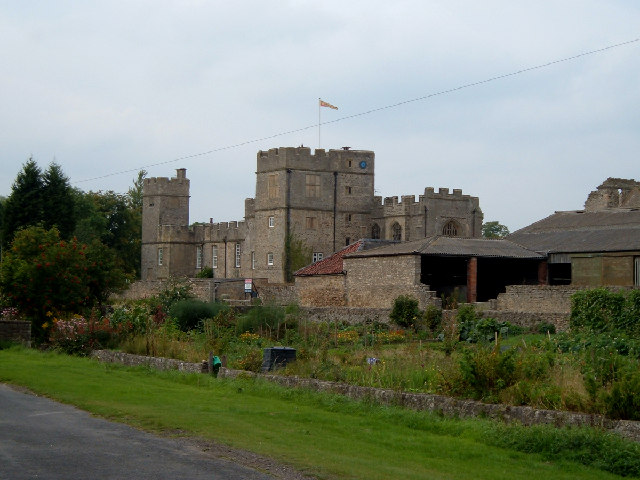
Snape Castle

Snape Castle was originally built c. 1430, when Ralph de Neville, 1st Earl of Westmorland gave Snape to his younger son, George Neville, 1st Baron Latimer. The second Lord Latimer was still only a minor when he inherited and the castle was held for a short while by Richard III. The third Lord Latimer was the second husband of Katherine Parr, later Queen of England. The daughter of the fourth Lord Latimer married Sir Thomas Cecil, 1st Earl of Exeter and the castle thus passed into the hands of the Cecil family.

Sir Thomas largely rebuilt the castle in the 16th century, adding the four towers, and transforming the building into an Elizabethan dwelling house. As the Cecils concentrated on their Burghley Park mansion Snape was left to deteriorate before being purchased by William Milbank in 1798. It was later divided into two domestic premises before being reunited as one home in 2003.

== Thorp Perrow ==
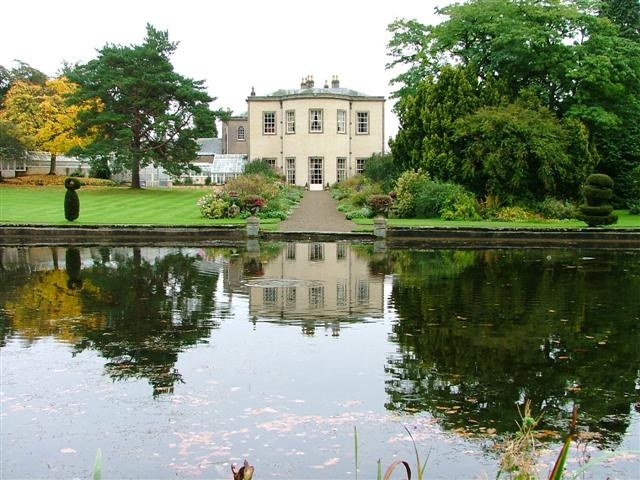
Thorp Perrow Hall

Thorp Perrow Hall is a large 18th-century country house standing in an estate on the northern edge of Snape village. It is built of cement rendered stone with a central 3-storey 5-bay block and 2-storey wings. The central three bays are bowed.

The Thorp Perrow estate belonged at one time to Sir Robert Danby but was then acquired by William Milbank, who also bought the castle and Snape village in 1798. His son and heir Mark Milbank was MP for Camelford. His wife, Lady Augusta, created the pinetum on the estate.

The estate was bought in 1927 by William Ropner and has since passed down in the Ropner family. His son, Sir Leonard Ropner, 1st Baronet created a renowned 85 acre Thorp Perrow Arboretum on the estate, incorporating the pinetum, which is open to the public throughout most of the year. In 2012, the Ropner family opened the house as a wedding venue.

== See also ==
- Listed buildings in Snape with Thorp
