= John Neville, 3rd Baron Latimer =

English politician and Baron

- Born: 17 November 1493
- Died: 2 March 1543 (aged 49)
- Noble family: Neville
- Spouses: Dorothy de Vere; Elizabeth Musgrave Catherine Parr (m. 1534)
- Issue: John Neville, 4th Baron Latimer; Margaret Neville
- Father: Richard Neville, 2nd Baron Latimer
- Mother: Anne Stafford

John Neville, 3rd Baron Latimer (17 November 1493 – 2 March 1543) was an English peer. His third wife was Catherine Parr, later queen of England.

== Family ==
John Neville, born 17 November 1493, was the eldest son of Richard Neville, 2nd Baron Latimer, by Anne Stafford, daughter of Sir Humphrey Stafford (died 1486) of Grafton, Worcestershire, and Katherine Fray (12 May 1482), the daughter of Sir John Fray, Chief Baron of the Exchequer, by Agnes Danvers (d. June 1478), the daughter of Sir John Danvers (died c. 1448). He had five brothers and six sisters.

== Career ==
The Neville family was one of the oldest and most powerful in the North, with a long-standing tradition of military service and a reputation for seeking power at the cost of the loyalty to the crown.

Neville came to court as one of the King's gentlemen-pensioners. In 1513 he served in King Henry VIII's French campaign, and was knighted after the capture of Tournai. He took part about 1517 in the investigation of the case of the Holy Maid of Leominster. He was knight of the shire (MP) for Yorkshire in 1529, his fellow knight of the shire being his cousin, Sir Marmaduke Constable, the son of his mother's sister, Joyce Stafford, and Sir Marmaduke Constable.

Neville's father died before the end of 1530. Neville was appointed to the Council of the North in that year, and signed the letter petitioning Pope Clement VII to grant Henry VIII a divorce from Catherine of Aragon. He had livery of his lands on 17 March 1531. He lived chiefly at Snape Castle, Yorkshire.

In 1536, he was implicated in the Pilgrimage of Grace, in an ambivalent role. It was rumoured that he was captured by the rebels, and he afterwards said of the part he had played: "My being among them was a very painful and dangerous time to me". He represented the insurgents, however, in November 1536 at the conferences with the royal leaders, and helped to secure the amnesty. He then returned home and took no part in Bigod's Rebellion of the following year. He did have to give up his town house in the churchyard of the Charterhouse to a friend of Lord Russell.

== Death ==
He died 2 March 1543 in London, and was buried in St. Paul's Cathedral.

== Marriages and issue ==
Neville married firstly, by 1520, Dorothy (d. 7 February 1527), daughter of Sir George de Vere by Margaret Stafford, and sister of John de Vere, 14th Earl of Oxford, by whom he had a son and a daughter:

- John Neville, 4th Baron Latimer (1520-1577), married Lucy Somerset and had issue. Latimer was buried next to Snape Castle in St. Michael's Church, Wells, within Nevilles' Chapel.
- Margaret Neville (1525-1546), was betrothed to Ralph Bigod. She died childless.

Neville married secondly, by licence dated 20 June 1528 Elizabeth (d. before 1533), daughter of Sir Edward Musgrave of Hartley, Westmorland, and Edenhall, Cumberland, by whom he had no issue.

Neville married thirdly, in 1534, Catherine (1512–1548), daughter of Sir Thomas Parr of Kendal, Westmorland, and widow of Sir Edward Borough (d. 1533), son of Thomas Burgh, 1st Baron Burgh. She afterwards became the sixth wife of King Henry VIII.

== Footnotes ==
Peerage of England
Preceded by Richard Neville	Baron Latimer; 1531–1543	Succeeded by John Neville
