= Well, North Yorkshire =

Village and civil parish in North Yorkshire, England

Coordinates: 54°13′56″N 1°35′32″W

Well
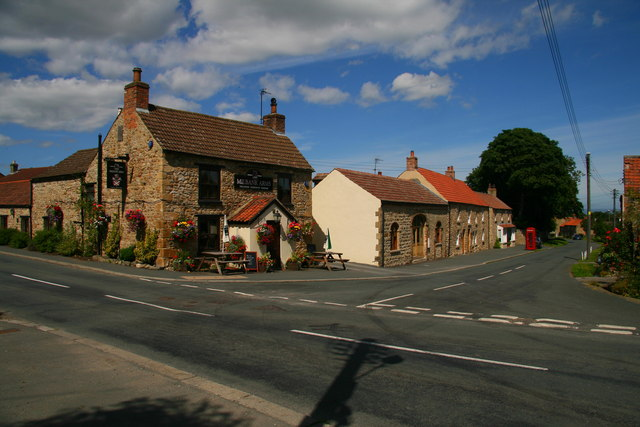
- Crossroads in Well, with the Milbank Arms on the left

- Location within North Yorkshire
- Population: 230 (2011 census)
- OS grid reference: SE266819
- Unitary authority: North Yorkshire
- Ceremonial county: North Yorkshire
- Region: Yorkshire and the Humber
- Country: England
- Sovereign state: United Kingdom
- Post town: Bedale
- Postcode district: DL8
- Dialling code: 01677
- Police: North Yorkshire
- Fire: North Yorkshire
- Ambulance: Yorkshire

Well is a small village and civil parish in the county of North Yorkshire, England. It is about 4 miles (6.4 km) south of Bedale, near Snape. The village is situated at the edge of a limestone escarpment that overlooks the Vale of Mowbray. The population recorded by the 2011 Census was 230.

From 1974 to 2023 it was part of the Hambleton District, it is now administered by the unitary North Yorkshire Council.

== History ==
The "well" of Well is a spring which, along with several other springs, feeds the beck running through the village. The well lends its name to the village, described as Wella in the Domesday Book. The name Wella is Old English, literally meaning well or stream. The village used to be in the wapentake of Hang East.

The village has an old school with a schoolhouse. The Old School, originally the workhouse school, was founded in 1605 by Thomas Earl of Exeter and his wife Dorothy, daughter of John Neville. The school was endowed with £30 a year for the maintenance of a master and mistress and 12 poor girls from Well and Snape. In 1788, it was converted into two single sex free schools, which each house in the village could send a boy and a girl between the ages of 6 and 13, with the option to pay for additional places. The school was rebuilt in 1867 and in 1890 had space for 80 pupils.

Built in 1722, the old schoolhouse is Grade II listed principally owing to its 18th-century roof structure, inglenook fireplace, and having been built by the same charitable trust. Today, they are both owned by The Neville Trust.

The village still has four almshouses called St Michael's Cottages with their own chapel. There is a family-run pub, The Milbank Arms, which serves food and drinks.

There is a Methodist Chapel, which holds regular services, and a village institute, which is used for children's parties, coffee mornings and other events. Every August, the village hosts a scarecrow trail in which many of the houses create a scarecrow and give it a name.

== The church ==
St Michael's Church, Well is a Grade I listed, 12th-century structure. A place of worship was noted in the Domesday Book, but the present structure dates from the 12th and 14th centuries, being built by Sir Ralph Neville. The church contains a portion of Roman mosaic found in 1859.

== See also ==
- Listed buildings in Well, North Yorkshire
