= Verney (surname) =

Verney is a surname, and may refer to:

- Anne-Charlotte Verney, French racing and rally driver
- Arthur Verney (1943–2013), British deaf and disability rights campaigner
- Bertha Des Verney (1890–1975), American pianist and composer
- David Verney, 21st Baron Willoughby de Broke (born 1938), British peer
- Edmund Verney (Cavalier) (1590 or 1596–1642), English royalist, MP for Buckingham 1624, New Romney, Aylesbury and Wycombe
- Edmund Verney (soldier) (1616–1649), English soldier, son of the above
- Sir Edmund Verney, 3rd Baronet (1838–1910), British naval officer, author and politician
- Sir Edmund Verney, 6th Baronet (born 1950), British peer
- Eleanor Verney (fl.1503), English courtier
- Ernest Basil Verney (1894–1967), British pharmacologist
- Frances Parthenope Verney (1819–1890), English writer and journalist
- Francis Verney (1584–1615), English adventurer, soldier of fortune and pirate
- Frederick Verney] (1846–1913), English Church of England cleric, barrister, diplomat and politician
- George Verney (1871–1950), English footballer
- George Verney, 12th Baron Willoughby de Broke (1659–1728), English peer and clergyman
- Gerald Lloyd-Verney (1900–1957), British general
- Greville Verney, 7th Baron Willoughby de Broke (1586–1642), English politician
- Greville Verney, 8th Baron Willoughby de Broke (c.1620–1648), English peer
- Greville Verney, 9th Baron Willoughby de Broke (1649–1668), English peer
- Harry Lloyd Verney (1872–1950), British courtier
- Sir Harry Verney, 2nd Baronet (1801–1894), British politician
- Sir Harry Verney, 4th Baronet (1881–1974), British politician
- Henry Peyto-Verney, 16th Baron Willoughby de Broke (1773–1852), British peer
- James W. Verney (1834–1902), Union Navy sailor in the American Civil War
- John Verney, 1st Viscount Fermanagh (1640–1717), Irish peer, English MP for Buckinghamshire and Amersham
- John Verney (judge) (1699–1741), British Master of the Rolls, MP for Downton
- John Verney, 20th Baron Willoughby de Broke (1896–1986), British officer, Lord Lieutenant of Warwickshire
- John Verney (author) (1913–1993), British author and illustrator
- John Peyto-Verney, 14th Baron Willoughby de Broke (1738–1816), British peer
- John Peyto-Verney, 15th Baron Willoughby de Broke (1762–1820), British peer
- Lawrence Verney (1924–2014), British judge
- Luís António Verney, Portuguese philosopher, theologian and pedagogue
- Margaret Verney (1844–1930), Welsh educationist
- Molly Verney (1675–1696), English noblewoman
- Ralph Verney (MP for City of London) (fl.1459), English politician
- Sir Ralph Verney, 1st Baronet, of Middle Claydon (1613–1696), English politician
- Ralph Verney, 1st Earl Verney (1683–1752), English politician
- Ralph Verney, 2nd Earl Verney (1714–1791), English politician, his son
- Sir Ralph Verney, 1st Baronet, of Eaton Square (1879–1959), Secretary to the Viceroy of India and the Speaker of the House of Commons
- Sir Ralph Verney, 5th Baronet (1915–2001), British Army officer, local politician and landowner
- Regan Verney (born 1992), New Zealand rugby union footballer
- Richard Verney (1563–1630), English landowner and politician
- Richard Verney, 11th Baron Willoughby de Broke (1622–1711), English peer
- Richard Verney, 13th Baron Willoughby de Broke (1693–1752), English peer
- Richard Verney, 19th Baron Willoughby de Broke (1869–1923), British politician
- Robert Verney, 17th Baron Willoughby de Broke (1809–1862), British peer
- Russ Verney, American political adviser
- Stephen Verney (1919–2009), English Bishop of Repton
- William Verney, 10th Baron Willoughby de Broke (1668–1683), English peer

== See also ==
- Verney family
- Verny (surname)
- Vernay (surname)
- Vernet
- Varney (surname)
- Veney (surname)
