= Baron Latimer =

Title in the Peerage of England

The title Baron Latimer or Latymer has been created, by the definitions of modern peerage law, four times in the Peerage of England. Of these, one (of Snape) was restored from abeyance in 1913; one (of Braybrook) is forfeit; the other two (both of Corby) are dormant, although their heir is well known.

== Name and title ==
All of these, and the title of Viscount Latimer, belong to the descendants of the same medieval family, whose surname was Latimer (Latiner or "translator"); the fourteenth-century form of the name should therefore be le Latimer, but it is often found as de Latimer as though it were a placename.

== Armorials ==
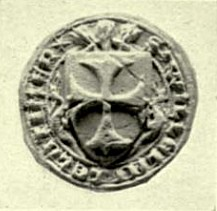
Seal of William Latimer, 1st Baron Latimer (died 1305), affixed to the Barons' Letter of 1301 to the Pope, in which he is called Will(elmu)s le Latimer D(omi)n(u)s de Corby ("William le Latimer Lord of Corby"), his seal showing a cross patonce

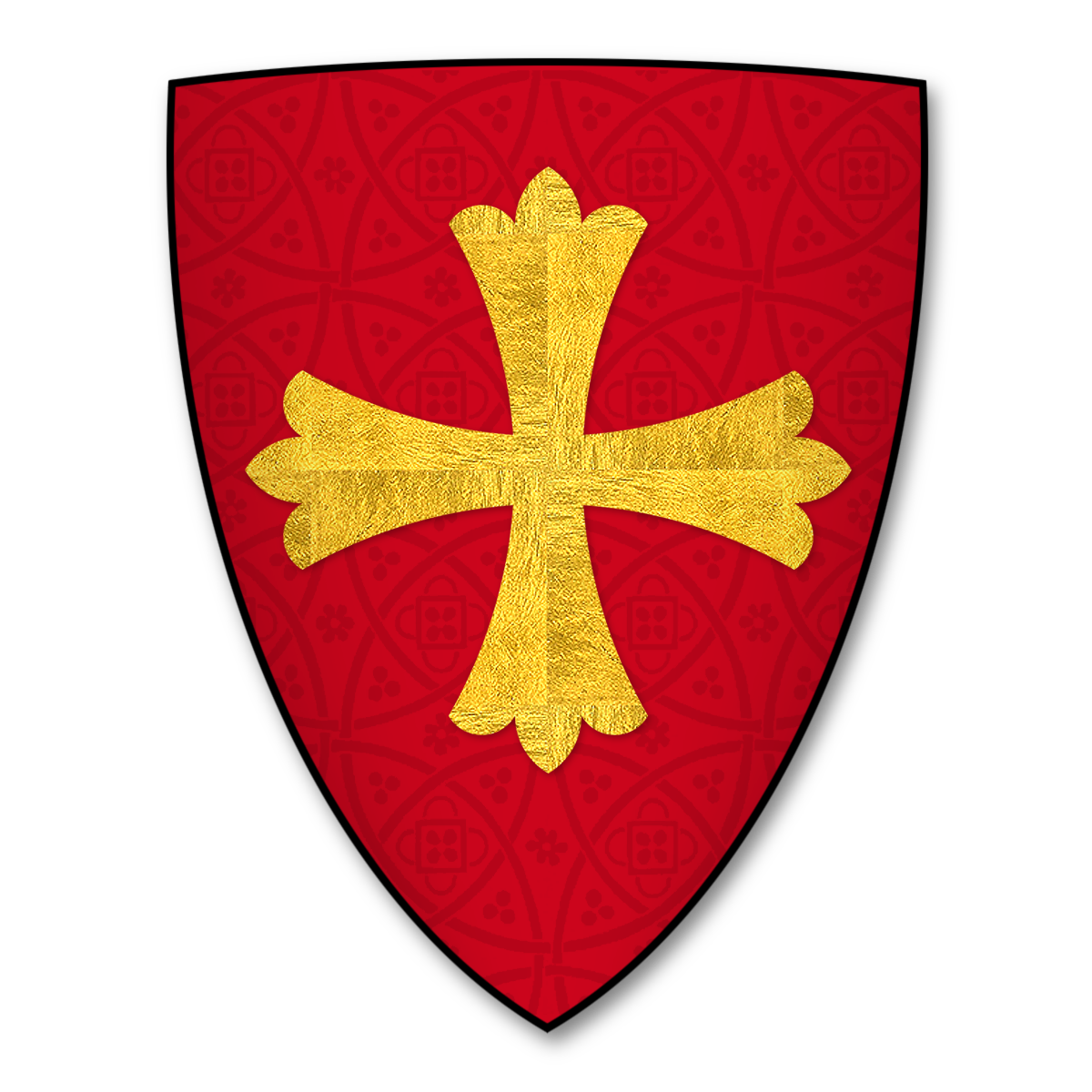
Arms of William Latimer, 1st Baron Latimer (died 1304): Gules, a cross patonce or

The arms of Latimer appear originally to have been Gules, a cross patonce or. The stems of a cross patonce should expand, as a cross pattée, then terminate more or less like a cross flory. The earliest surviving representation is on the seal of William Latimer, 1st Baron Latimer (died 1305), affixed to the Barons' Letter of 1301 to the Pope.

The arms of William le Latimer were blazoned in Franco-Norman verse by the heralds in the Caerlaverock Roll of Arms made in Scotland during the Siege of Caerlaverock in 1300 as follows:

De Guilleme le Latimer portoit en rouge bien pourtraite. Ki la crois patée de or mier ("William le Latimer bore in red well painted the cross patée of gold ...")

The term "patee" in this verse of the poem should not be interpreted as paty, or pattée, but rather as patonce. His cross patonce is also displayed in a contemporary stained glass window in Dorchester Church.

In the blazons of the Latimer arms in subsequent rolls the cross is blazoned as patee and patey, though in later times as cross patonce:

- Sire William de LATIMER: de goules, a un croys patee de or (Roll, tempore. ED. II.
- Monsire Le LATIMER, port de gules a une crois patey or (Roll, temp. ED. III)
- Gules, a cross patonce or (LATIMER, Northamp.)

The late-medieval heraldic Angevin French terms patee and patey were incorrectly considered equivalent to the 18th century heraldic English patée by most heralds of the 19th century, supposing an early variance in the family arms. But throughout the 14th century the arms consistently displayed Gules, a cross patonce or. One 19th century archivist incorrectly described the cross patonce of William Latimer, 4th Baron Latimer, as a cross flory.

== Barons Latimer (of Corby; 1299) ==
=== Latimer ===
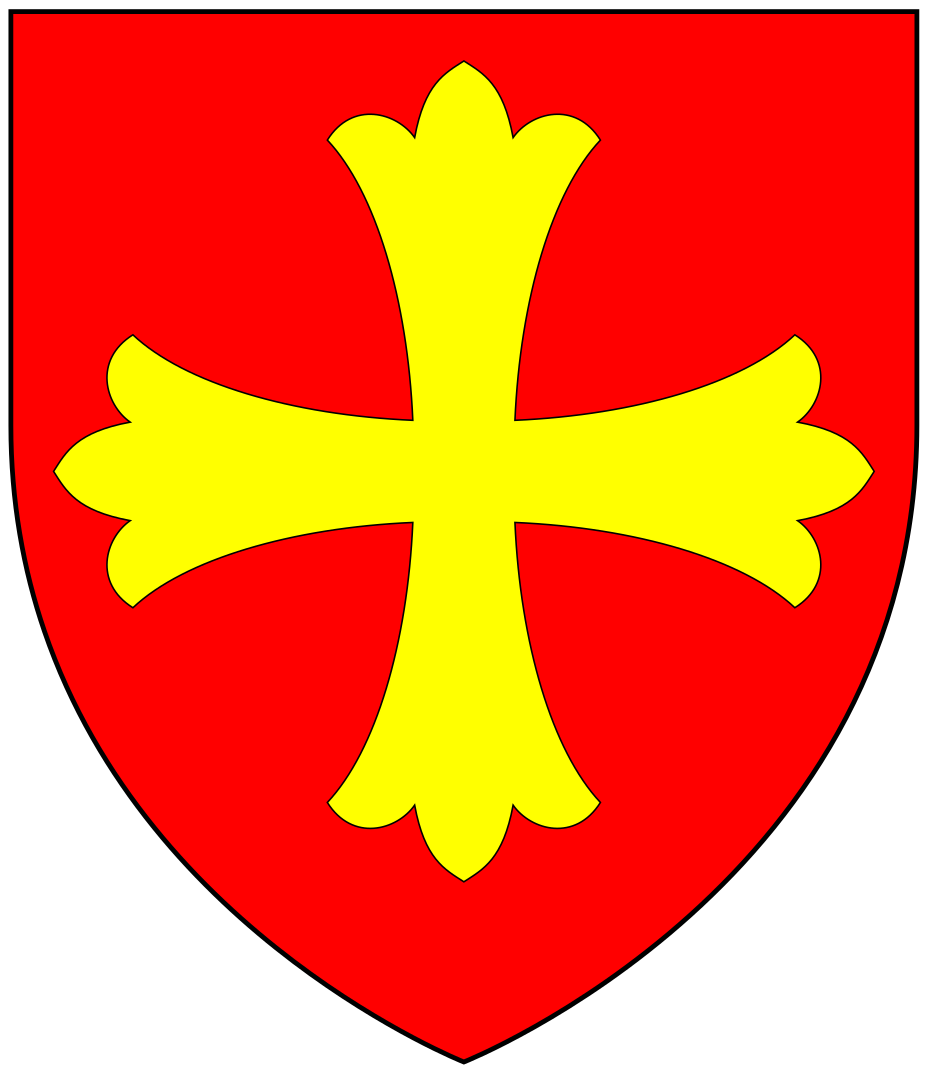
Arms of Latimer: Gules, a cross patonce or

By modern law the existence of a barony by writ requires three things: a (recorded) writ, evidence that the recipient of the writ actually sat in Parliament, and that the Parliament meets the modern legal definition by including representatives of the shires or towns. The oldest writs for the Latimers date from 1299, although the first Baron Latimer also sat in the Parliament of 1290.

- William Latimer, 1st Baron Latimer (died 1304). He sealed the Barons' Letter of 1301 to the Pope as Will(elmu)s le Latimer D(omi)n(u)s de Corby ("William le Latimer Lord of Corby"), his seal showing a cross patonce.
- William Latimer, 2nd Baron Latimer (died 1327), son.
- William Latimer, 3rd Baron Latimer (c. 1300 – 1335), son.
- William Latimer, 4th Baron Latimer (c. 1329 – 1381), son.
- Elizabeth Latimer, 5th Baroness Latimer (c. 1356 – 1395), only surviving child and Baroness in her own right. Within five months of her father's death she married (as his second wife) John Neville, 3rd Baron Neville, whom she survived and remarried to Robert Willoughby, 4th Baron Willoughby de Eresby, by whom she had a daughter Margaret. By her first husband John Neville she had children as follows:
  - John Neville, 6th Baron Latimer.
  - Elizabeth Neville, who married her step-brother Sir Thomas Willoughby.

=== Neville ===
Arms of Neville: Gules, a saltire argent

- John Nevill, 6th Baron Latimer (c. 1383 – 1430), who secured a divorce from his wife, and had no children. He left his lands to his half-brother, Ralph de Neville, 1st Earl of Westmorland, although he was not descended from the Latimers. The Earl died in 1425, and the lands were passed on to George Neville, one of his younger sons, who was summoned to Parliament as Baron Latimer (second creation).

By modern law, however, the ancient Latimer title could not be transferred by will. John Neville's sisters had both predeceased him. Margaret had died unmarried, and Elizabeth had married Sir Thomas Willoughby, one of her step-father's younger sons, so the Barony of Latimer is held to have passed to her son and heir, Sir John Willoughby.

=== Willoughby ===
Arms of Willoughby: quarterly 1st & 4th Or, a cross engrailed sable (Willoughby); 2nd and 3rd Gules, a cross moline argent (Beke)

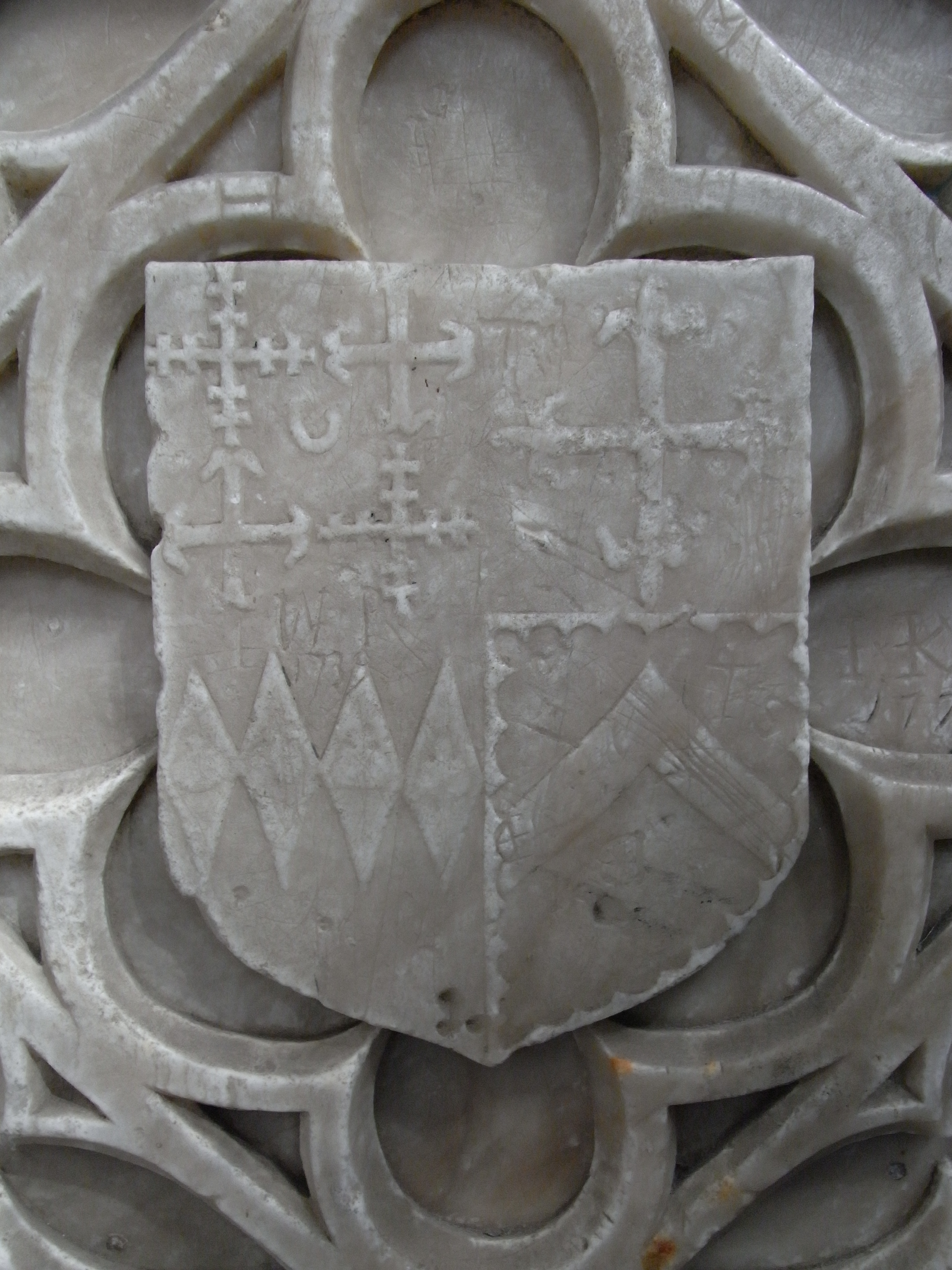
Quartered arms of Robert Willoughby, 1st Baron Willoughby de Broke (died 1502) on his monument in Callington Church in Cornwall, which display in the second quarter the arms of Latimer (or possibly arms of Paveley of Broke in Wiltshire: Azure, a cross flory or)

Three generations of Willoughbys succeeded, and are in modern law heirs to the barony of Latimer; the numbers are their ordinal as Baron(ess) Latimer, if the title is ever claimed:

7 John Willoughby (c. 1400 – 1437)
8 Sir John Willoughby (c. 1421 – 1477)
9 Robert Willoughby (c. 1452 – 1502)

In the intervening seventy years, it had been generally accepted that peers had an inheritable right to receive a writ, but it was not yet decided exactly how the right was inherited.

Robert Willoughby, who was one of Henry VII's military commanders, was summoned to Parliament under the style of Baron Willoughby de Broke in 1491. Richard Neville, 2nd Baron Latimer, the grandson of George Neville, 1st Baron Latimer above, sat in the same Parliament, having just come of age. There were land disputes between the two families, and the new Baron Willoughby de Broke claimed that he should have been summoned as Baron Latimer. Richard Neville responded through his counsel that baronies by writ were inherited in the male line; when John Neville died, his barony became extinct; his grandfather had been granted a new Barony of Latimer, because there wasn't one.

The decision was that there were two baronies of Latimer. Robert Willoughby was heir to the older one, created in 1299, and had a right to claim it, but the summons to George Neville in 1432 had created a second barony of Latimer. The land dispute was settled by a marriage between the younger members of the family, and Robert Willoughby chose not to claim the barony of Latimer. He already had a seat in the House of Lords.

9 Robert Willoughby, 1st Baron Willoughby de Broke (c.1452–1502; repeated from above)
10 Robert Willoughby, 2nd Baron Willoughby de Broke (1472–1521), often called Lord Broke or Brooke.
- His son, Edward Willoughby, (c.1495 - November 1517) married Margaret Neville, eldest daughter of Richard Neville, 2nd Baron Latimer, and died in his father's lifetime.

The death of the second Baron Willoughby de Broke gave rise to another clarification of peerage law. His son, Edward Willoughby, who predeceased him, left three daughters, two of whom, Anne and Blanche, died childless. The survivor, Elizabeth Willoughby (the greatest heiress of her time), married Sir Fulke Greville. Neither she nor her eldest son, another Fulke Greville, nor her grandson, Fulke Greville, 1st Baron Brooke, claimed the title. His grand-nephew and heir general, Sir Richard Verney, claimed the title of Lord Brooke in 1694 as the heir of Robert Willoughby, 2nd Baron Willoughby de Broke; this petition was rejected. However, in 1696 he made a second application, and it was decided that Elizabeth Willoughby had succeeded to the title about 1535, at her youngest sister's death - and Richard Verney therefore became Baron Willoughby de Broke.

11 Elizabeth Willoughby, 3rd Baroness Willoughby de Broke, granddaughter.

=== Greville ===
12 Sir Fulke Greville (c. 1526 – 1606), son.
13 Sir Fulke Greville, 1st Baron Brooke (1554–1628), son; cr. Baron Brooke 1621; by special remainder in the patent, that title passed to his Greville cousin and adoptive son Robert Greville, 2nd Baron Brooke.
14 Margaret Verney née Greville, (c. 1561 – 1631), sister.

=== Verney ===
15 Sir Greville Verney (c. 1586 – 1642), son.
16 Greville Verney (c. 1620 – 1648), son.
17 Sir Greville Verney (1649–1668), posthumous son.
18 William Verney (1668–1683), son, succeeded at the age of six weeks.
19 Richard Verney, 11th Baron Willoughby de Broke (1621–1711), great-uncle.
20 George Verney, 12th Baron Willoughby de Broke (1659–1728), son.
21 Richard Verney, 13th Baron Willoughby de Broke (1693–1752), son.
22 John Verney, 14th Baron Willoughby de Broke (1738–1816), nephew (brother's son).
- He later took the surname Peyto-Verney as beneficiary of the will of his cousin, Margaret Peyto; married the sister of Frederick North, Lord North, the prime minister.
23 John Peyto-Verney, 15th Baron Willoughby de Broke (1762–1820), son.
24 Henry Peyto-Verney, 16th Baron Willoughby de Broke (1773–1852), brother.
25 Robert John Verney, 17th Baron Willoughby de Broke (1809–1862), sororal nephew; born Robert John Barnard but assumed the name of Verney shortly after his accession.
26 Henry Verney, 18th Baron Willoughby de Broke (1844–1902), son.
27 Richard Greville Verney, 19th Baron Willoughby de Broke (1869–1923), son.
- Leader of the Ditchers in the dispute over the Parliament Act 1911.
28 John Henry Peyto Verney, 20th Baron Willoughby de Broke (1896–1986), son.
29 Leopold David Verney, 21st Baron Willoughby de Broke (b. 1938), son.
- One of the 92 representative peers under the House of Lords Act 1999 (UKIP).

All of the Lords Willoughby de Broke have also been heirs to the Barony of Latimer, but none of them have claimed it. The 21st Baron Willoughby de Broke, Leopold David Verney, would be the 29th Baron Latimer if he chose to claim it; his heir apparent is the Hon. Rupert Greville Verney (b. 1966).

== Barons Latimer or Latymer (of Snape; 1432) ==
As said above, George Neville, a younger son of the first Earl of Westmorland, succeeded to the lands of his uncle, John Neville, 6th Baron Latimer, although he was not descended from the ancient Latimers. He was summoned to Parliament as Baron Latimer in 1432; by modern law, as decided in the 1490s, this was a new creation of a new Barony of Latimer. It descended as follows.

- George Neville, 1st Baron Latimer (died 1469)
- Richard Neville, 2nd Baron Latimer (1468–1530), grandson.
- John Neville, 3rd Baron Latimer (1493–1543), son.
  - Married three times. His first wife was Dorothy de Vere, sister and eventual co-heiress of John de Vere, 14th Earl of Oxford; his third wife - and widow - was Catherine Parr, later Queen of England.
- John Neville, 4th Baron Latimer (1520–1577), only son (his mother was Dorothy de Vere).

These Barons Latimer held Snape Castle in Wensleydale.

John Neville, 4th Baron Latimer, had four daughters, all of whom had issue.

1. Catherine Percy, Countess of Northumberland.
2. Dorothy Cecil, afterward Countess of Exeter.
3. Lucy Cornwallis.
4. Elizabeth Danvers.

Tudor custom was divided on what happened in such a case; the style of Lord Latimer was claimed both by the earls and dukes of Northumberland, descendants of his eldest daughter, and by his cousin and heir male, another Richard Neville (died 1590), son of William Neville, younger brother of the 3rd Baron Latimer. Modern law, as worked out over the next century, was that the barony was divided into quarters among the four daughters and their heirs, a situation called abeyance. If three of the lines died out, the fourth would inherit; if not, the Crown might, at its pleasure, confer the title on any of the heirs - customarily, the one who petitioned for it.

Lucy Cornwallis had only daughters, so her share was itself divided. In 1911, the heritor of one of these sub-shares (Francis Burdett Thomas Money-Coutts, of the prominent Liberal banking family) petitioned that the abeyance be determined, and in February 1913, he was summoned to Parliament. He and his heirs have chosen to spell their title Latymer, and most sources follow them.

- Francis Money-Coutts, 5th Baron Latymer (1852–1923) (abeyance terminated 1913)
- Hugh Burdett Money-Coutts, 6th Baron Latymer (1876–1949), son
- Thomas Burdett Money-Coutts, 7th Baron Latymer (1901–1987), son
- Hugo Nevill Money-Coutts, 8th Baron Latymer (1926–2003), son
- Crispin James Alan Nevill Money-Coutts, 9th Baron Latymer (b. 1955), son

The heir apparent is the present holder's son the Hon. Drummond William Thomas Money-Coutts (b. 1986)

== Barons Latimer (of Corby; 1299; bis) ==
William, the first Lord Latimer above named, was of an advanced age when he received his first recorded writ of summons, to the Parliament of Christmas 1299. He is recorded as having sat in one of the Parliaments of 1290, but no writ is recorded; by modern law no peerage was formed.

Two members of his family were summoned and sat in Parliament in his lifetime: his eldest son, another William, and his nephew Thomas. The younger Sir William Latimer was summoned to, and sat in, the Parliament of Candlemas, 1299, ten months before his father, and continued to be summoned for the rest of his life. By modern law, this would create a separate Barony of Latimer, although the two have been held by the same people since the elder Sir William's death in 1305.

This barony is therefore also dormant, although the heir is, like the other barony of 1299, also the present Baron Willoughby de Broke. If David Verney, 21st Baron Willoughby de Broke claimed this title, he would be 28th Baron Latimer, but have somewhat higher precedence.

== Barons Latimer (of Braybrook; 1299) ==
Sir William Latimer, first Baron Latimer above, was also accompanied to the Parliament of Christmas 1299 by his nephew, Sir Thomas le Latimer, who was summoned by writ and sat; Sir William and his late brother Sir John had married sisters, the heiresses of Walter Ledet of Braybrook and Corby; each of the brothers had inherited one of the castles, and Sir John had died at the end of 1282.

This summons created a fourth Barony of Latimer by modern law, although Thomas Latimer, first Lord Latimer of this line, was only summoned until 1308, and none of his heirs were summoned at all. Complete Peerage traces the line of descent as follows:

- Thomas le Latimer (c. 1270 – 1334), founder.
- Warin le Latimer (c. 1300 – 1349), son.
  - Married Catherine la Warre, daughter of John la Warr, 2nd Baron De La Warr
- John le Latimer (c. 1323 – 1356), son.
- Warin le Latimer (c. 1341 – 1361), brother.
- Thomas le Latimer (1341–1401), brother, a Lollard sympathizer
- Edward le Latimer (c. 1345 – 1411), brother
- John Griffin (c. 1380 – 1445), great-nephew
  - Grandson of Elizabeth Griffin, née Latimer, sister of the previous heirs.
- Nicholas Griffin, (1426–1482), nephew.
- John Griffin (1454–1485), son
- Nicholas Griffin (1474–1509), son
- Thomas Griffin (1485–1566), son
  - His son, Rice Griffin, was killed 1549, in Kett's Rebellion, leaving a daughter:
- Mary Griffin, (before 1546 - ?), granddaughter, married Thomas Markham.
- Griffin Markham (c. 1570 - after 1644), attainted 1603.

Sir Griffin Markham was one of the bravoes employed in the Bye Plot, an effort to kidnap James I of England and Scotland. He was attainted and exiled, at which point this shadowy peerage became forfeit.

Unless this attainder were reversed, this barony would not belong to anybody. Even if it were, it is not clear who could claim it, since the accounts of Markham's family vary. One source says he left two daughters, another that he was childless; one that he himself was one of twelve sons, yet another that he was one of six sons and there were four daughters.

== Viscount Latimer ==
Thomas Osborne, the Restoration politician, worked his way up from a baronetcy to being first Duke of Leeds. In this climb, his third peerage title was Viscount Latimer, conferred 15 August 1673; he was to become Earl of Danby the next June.

All of Osborne's titles are now extinct at the death of the last Duke of Leeds in 1964; but Viscount Latimer was used as a title of courtesy for Osborne's eldest son from 1674 to his death, in his father's lifetime, in January 1689.

This title does recognize Osborne as a member of this same extended family: his grandmother was the daughter of Elizabeth Danvers, fourth daughter of John Nevill, 4th Baron Latimer, of the 1432 creation. He had no share in the abeyance; his grandmother had three brothers, his great-uncles: Charles Danvers, Henry Danvers, 1st Earl of Danby, and John Danvers the regicide, and her own heir was his uncle Thomas Walmesley, whose heir is the present Baron Petre.

== Sources ==
Complete Peerage of England, Scotland, Ireland, Great Britain and the United Kingdom, extant, extinct, or dormant London, 1910–1959, with supplemental volume XIV, 1994.

- "Latimer (of Braybrooke)"
- "Latimer (of Corby)"
- "Latimer or Latymer (Nevill)"
- "Willoughby de Broke"
- "Brooke"
- "Leeds"
