= Money-Coutts =

Money-Coutts is a surname used by descendants of Francis Money-Coutts, 5th Baron Latymer. Notable holders of the surname include:

- Francis Money-Coutts, 5th Baron Latymer (1852–1923), a British solicitor, writer, and heir to the Coutts banking family (article includes an explanation of the origin of the name)
- Hugh Burdett Money-Coutts, 6th Baron Latymer (1876–1949), son of 5th Baron, a British writer and politician
  - Mercy Seiradaki (née Money-Coutts, 1910–1993), a British archaeologist
- Thomas Burdett Money-Coutts, 7th Baron Latymer (1901–1987), son of 6th Baron, a British banker and hospital administrator
  - David Money-Coutts (1931–2012), his nephew, a British banker
- Hugo Money-Coutts, 8th Baron Latymer (1926–2003), son of 7th Baron, a British banker and sailor
- Crispin Money-Coutts, 9th Baron Latymer (born 1955), son of 8th Baron, a British banker, rower and sailor
- Drummond Money-Coutts (born 1986), son of 9th Baron, a British magician

== See also ==
- Baron Latimer#Barons Latimer or Latymer (of Snape; 1432), a title in the peerage of England
- Coutts (surname)
- Money (surname)
