= John Peyto-Verney =

John Peyto-Verney may refer to:

- John Peyto-Verney, 14th Baron Willoughby de Broke (1738–1816)
- John Peyto-Verney, 15th Baron Willoughby de Broke (1762–1820)
