= Coutts (surname) =

Coutts and Couts are surnames derived from the Scottish Gaelic language. The names are derived from the Gaelic cuilt. The chronicles of the Coutts family reach back into Scottish history to an ancient tribe known as the Picts. The ancestors of the Coutts family lived in Cults in Aberdeenshire where the name can be found since very early times. There are many place names in Cromar and Upper Deeside named Cults/Culsh.

== Early origins of the Coutts family ==
The surname Coutts was first found in Elginshire a former county in northeastern Scotland, in the present day Scottish Council Area of Moray, where they held a family seat from very early times.

William Coutts, a Coutts of Auchintoul, was a vassal of the Macdonalds, settled in Montrose, in the 16th century and became a provost of the town. The Coutts are associated with the Farquharsons.

== People with the surname ==
- Alicia Coutts, Australian medley, butterfly and freestyle swimmer
- Angela Burdett-Coutts, 1st Baroness Burdett-Coutts (1814–1906), 19th-century philanthropist
- Duncan Coutts (born 1969), member of Our Lady Peace
- Frank Coutts (1918–2008), Scotland international rugby union player
- Frederick Coutts (1899–1986), General of The Salvation Army (1963–1969)
- Gordon Coutts (1868–1937), Scottish-American painter
- Henry Coutts (1866–1944), New Zealand cricketer and soldier
- Ian Coutts (disambiguation)
- James Coutts (footballer) (born 1987), English footballer
- James Coutts Crawford (1760–1828), officer of the Royal Navy
- Jim Coutts (1938–2013), Canadian lawyer and businessman
- John Coutts (disambiguation), various people
- John Willie or John Alexander Scott Coutts (1902–1962), fetish photographer and bondage artist
- Joseph Coutts, Catholic Archbishop of Karachi
- Marion Coutts (born 1965), British sculptor, photographer, filmmaker, author, and musician
- Morton Coutts (1904–2004), New Zealand brewer and inventor
- Paul Coutts, Scottish association football player for Fleetwood Town
- Peter Coutts (cricketer) (1937–2015), New Zealand cricketer
- Russell Coutts, (born 1962), New Zealand competitive sailor
- Thomas Coutts (1735–1822), banker and founder of Coutts & Co
- Walter Coutts (1912–1988), British colonial administrator and Uganda's last governor before independence
- Wilfred Coutts (1908–1997), Australian politician

== See also ==
- Coutts, a bank
- Money-Coutts, a surname
- Coates (surname)
- Coats (surname)
