= Richard Verney (disambiguation) =

Richard Verney (1563–1630) was an English politician.

Richard Verney may also refer to:

- Richard Verney, 11th Baron Willoughby de Broke (1622–1711)
- Richard Verney, 13th Baron Willoughby de Broke (1693–1752)
- Richard Verney, 19th Baron Willoughby de Broke (1869–1923)
