= Vernay (surname) =

Vernay is a surname, and may refer to:

- Annie Vernay (1921–1941), French actress
- Arthur Stannard Vernay (1877–1960), American antique collector, hunter and explorer
- Clovis Vernay, French-Swiss chess grandmaster
- Denise Vernay (1924–2013), member of the French Resistance during World War II
- Jacques Aymar-Vernay (born 1662), French stonemason and dowser
- James D. Vernay (1834–1918), American soldier in the American Civil War awarded the Medal of Honor
- Jean-Karl Vernay (born 1987), French racing driver
- Manon Vernay (born 1989), Australian beach handball player
- Patrick Vernay, New Caledonian triathlete
- Robert Vernay (1907–1979), French screenwriter

== See also ==
- Verney (surname)
- Verny (surname)
