= Joan Russell =

English artist (born 1888)

Joan Russell (1888 – after 1958) was an English artist noted for her comprehensive study of the damage caused to Canterbury during the Baedeker Blitz.

== Life ==
Russell was born in Canterbury in 1888 as one of seven daughters of the Scottish-born, British Army officer John Cecil Russell who was then a colonel and commander of the cavalry depot in the city and his wife Hester Frances. She followed her father to the Isle of Mull, Scotland, and Bramford Hall in Suffolk. The family moved back to Canterbury in 1902, where they lived at Barton Court. Her father died in 1909 and the 1911 census records Joan living at Barton Court with her mother and her five spinster sisters; two children of her sister, Hester Frances, who had married Hugh Burdett Money-Coutts, 6th Baron Latymer, were also present on census day. The census also records the presence of six female servants in the 22-room house.

Because of the quality of her draughtsmanship and portraiture it is thought that she received formal training in art but it is not known where at. Russell is known to have completed several watercolour portraits and at least one in pastel. During the interwar years her work was exhibited at the Royal Academy, the Royal Scottish Academy, the New English Art Club, the Royal Society of Miniaturists and the Royal Society of Portraitists. She also completed drawings of many of the city's historic buildings.

During the Second World War Canterbury was targeted by German bombing raids as part of the Baedeker Blitz on culturally significant and historic English cities. Russell carried out a comprehensive study of the damage caused to Canterbury in drawings which were completed in pencil with a delicate watercolour wash. The historian Hubert Pragnell considers the work forms the most extensive record of bomb damage to any British city aside from London. The bulk of the drawings were made in 1943, in the year following the worst of the air raids.

Russell continued to paint after the war but no longer exhibited her work. In 1958 she, along with her sisters, presented a portrait of a man, to the Royal College of Physicians. The portrait was considered by the family to be that of an ancestor, the naturalist Alexander Russell (1715–1768), but the age of the sitter and style of dress mean it is likely a member of the later generations of the family. Joan Russell never married and, because only Hester among her sisters married, had little in the way of family to continue her legacy. This led to her becoming forgotten. Her work was donated to Canterbury Cathedral in the 1960s. Pragnall considers her work comparable to that of Dennis Flanders and Hanslip Fletcher who documented the London blitz.
