= Farther Common =

Settled common area in Hampshire, England

Coordinates: 51.0306°N 0.8849°W

Farther Common or Farther Commons is a geographical region of East Hampshire in the Parish of Liss, Hampshire, England. It is characterised by greensand topography, woodland and heath, which was a common on the Money-Coutts estate centred at Stodham House, Liss.

== Pre-history ==
There is a Bronze Age ring barrow at Saxonwood House and Peacewood.

== History ==
The plots of development land were sold off in parcels in the early part of the last century, served by two lanes which remain in use. Some of the plots are on steep parts of the greensand ridge. The original houses on both the north and south lanes of the Common were cedar houses, often now much altered. Other plots were sold off in parcels of an acre of more from the earlier plots and houses have been built in the 1960s, 1970s and 1980s.

== Geography ==
Farther Common is bounded to the East by Bones Bottom, to the West by Gravel Pit Bottom to the North by Stodham Lane and to the South by the North track. It is characterised by greensand topography, woodland and heath.

== Buildings ==
Stodham House was used as a Special Training School (STS 3) of the Special Operations Executive (SOE) during World War II, particularly for the training of Norwegian saboteurs. The Far House on the South Lane is a modernist, 1960s wooden house built by writer and former intelligence officer Selwyn Jepson while Ponticum on the North Lane is a remarkable 1960s modernist house looking out over the Chalk Hangars. The former Woodley House, (the gardeners cottage of Grey Walls House) and West Gables, the former servants quarters of the same property are not properly part of the Common, although now separated from their master house.

Some of the other houses built at a later time are built on smaller plots derived from the earlier larger ones. For instance, Fernhill from the 1970s. The site has previously been used for caravan accommodation for the staff of Hill Brow Nursing Home, now itself gone.

== Notable people ==
Some of those that came to build and live on the common have been notable.

- Money-Coutts; the family were part of the famous banking family, owners of Coutts & Co, London.
- Monica Storrs, "God's Galloping Girl" of Peace Wood.
- Henryk Zygalski. One of three Polish mathematicians/cryptologists credited with breaking the Enigma code in the 1930s. Operated for the Allies from a clandestine radio station in Vichy France and Algeria 1940-1942 during World War II. Lived with his partner, Mrs. B. Blofield in Greenwood (now known as Saxonwood House), Farther Common.
- Selwyn Jepson of the Far House, well-known author and intelligence officer (recruiting officer for F Section SOE) in World War II.
