= Verny (surname) =

Verny is a surname, and may refer to:

- Cécile Verny (born 1969), French jazz musician and singer
- Gérault Verny (born 1984), French politician
- Ivan Sherwood Verny (1798–1867), Russian Imperial Army officer of English descent
- Léonce Verny (1837–1908), French engineer
- Thibault Verny (born 1965), French archbishop
- Thomas Verny (1726–1808), French lawyer

== See also ==
- Verney (surname)
- Vernay (surname)
