= Baron Willoughby de Broke =

Title in the Peerage of England

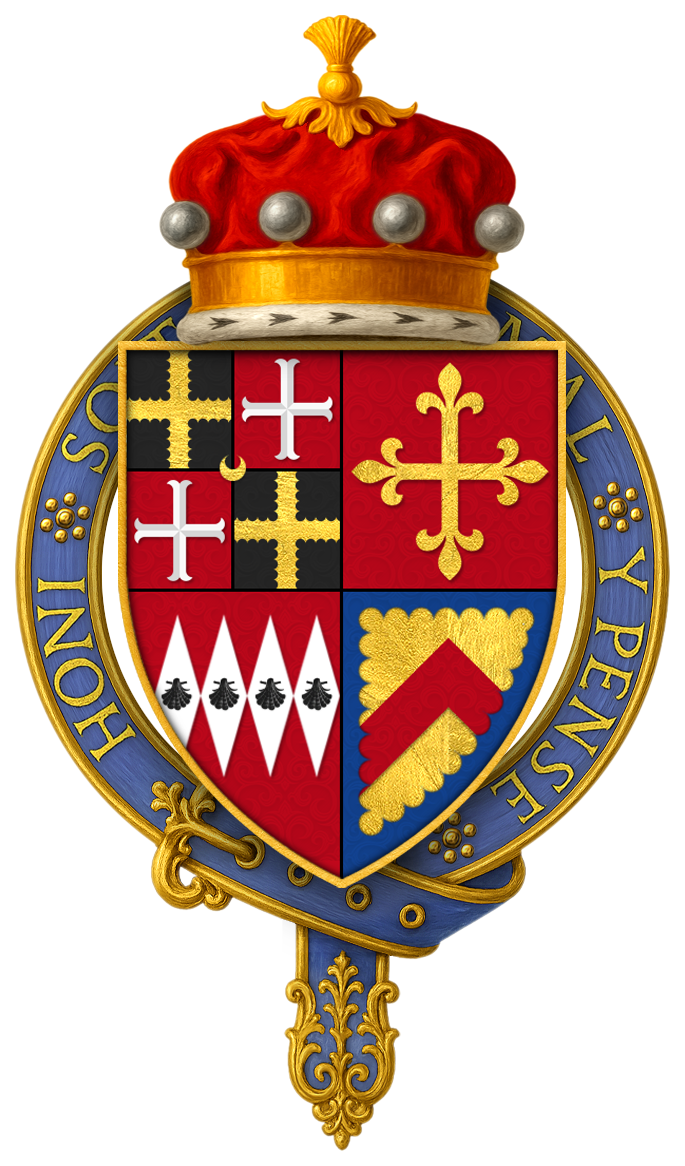
Arms of Robert Willoughby, 1st Baron Willoughby de Broke, Knight of the Garter

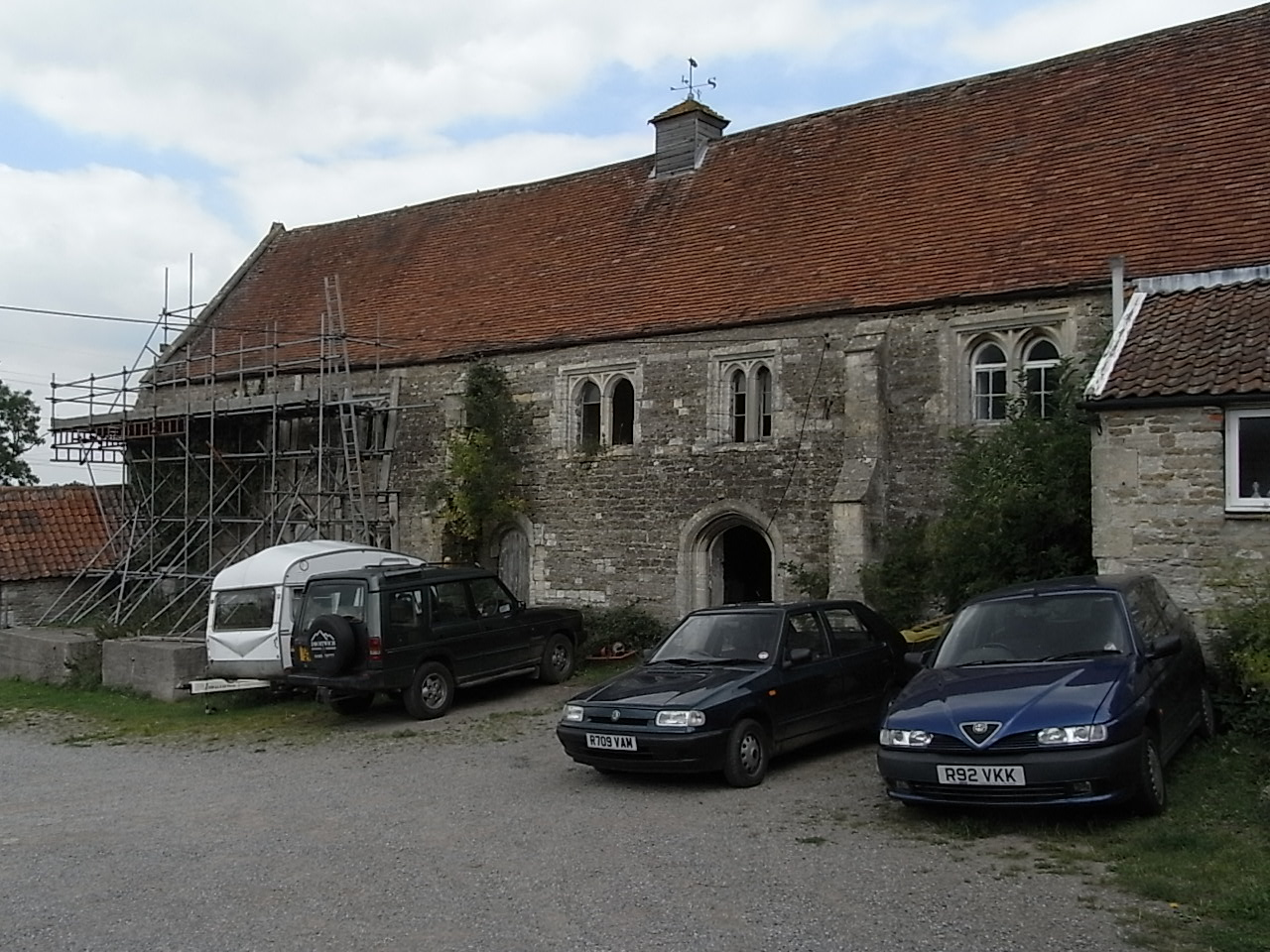
Medieval wing of Brook Hall, a Grade I listed building, looking north-westwards, in July 2011. This is the only surviving remnant of the manor house built by Robert Willoughby, 1st Baron Willoughby de Broke on his manor of Brook, in Heywood parish, Wilts.

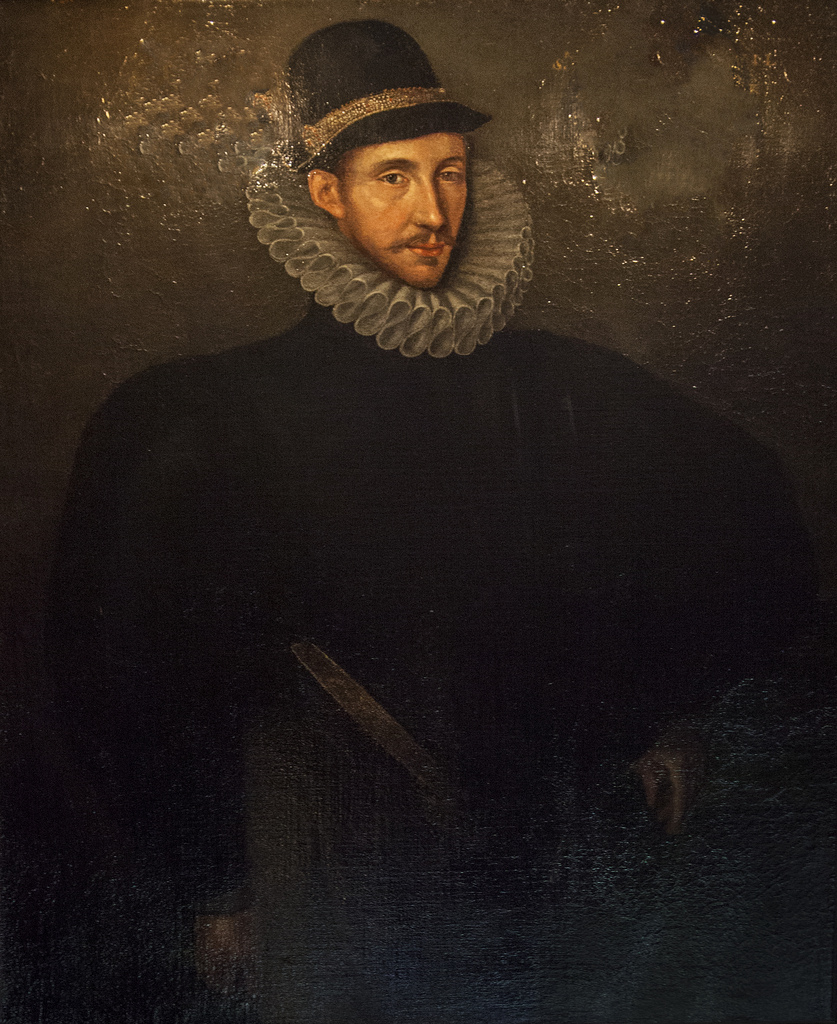
Fulke Greville, 1st Baron Brooke and 5th Baron Willoughby de Broke

Baron Willoughby de Broke is a title in the Peerage of England. It was created by writ in 1491 for Sir Robert Willoughby, of the manor of Broke, part of Westbury, Wiltshire, who according to modern doctrine was de jure 9th Baron Latimer. On the death of his son, the two baronies (the recognised barony of Willoughby de Broke and the de jure barony of Latimer) fell into abeyance. Around 1535, the abeyance was naturally terminated when the second Baron's granddaughter Elizabeth, who had married Sir Fulke Greville, became the only surviving co-heir, passing her claim to her son Sir Fulke Greville, father of the poet of the same name. The title stayed in the Greville family until after the death of the 5th Baron, when it passed to his sister, Margaret Greville, the wife of a Verney. Thereafter it remained in the Verney family. The Barons Willoughby de Broke remain heirs to the ancient Barony of Latimer (a title which predates their recognised Barony by almost two hundred years).

The current family seat is Ditchford Farm, near Moreton-in-Marsh, Gloucestershire. A former seat was Compton Verney House.

== Barons Willoughby de Broke (1491) ==
- Robert Willoughby, 1st Baron Willoughby de Broke (c. 1452–1502)
- Robert Willoughby, 2nd Baron Willoughby de Broke (1472–1521), on whose death title became abeyant
- Elizabeth Willoughby, 3rd Baroness Willoughby de Broke (buried 15 November 1562) (abeyance ended c.1535)
- Fulke Greville, 4th Baron Willoughby de Broke (c.1526–1606)
- Fulke Greville, 5th Baron Willoughby de Broke (1554–1628)
- Margaret Greville, 6th Baroness Willoughby de Broke (c.1561–1631)

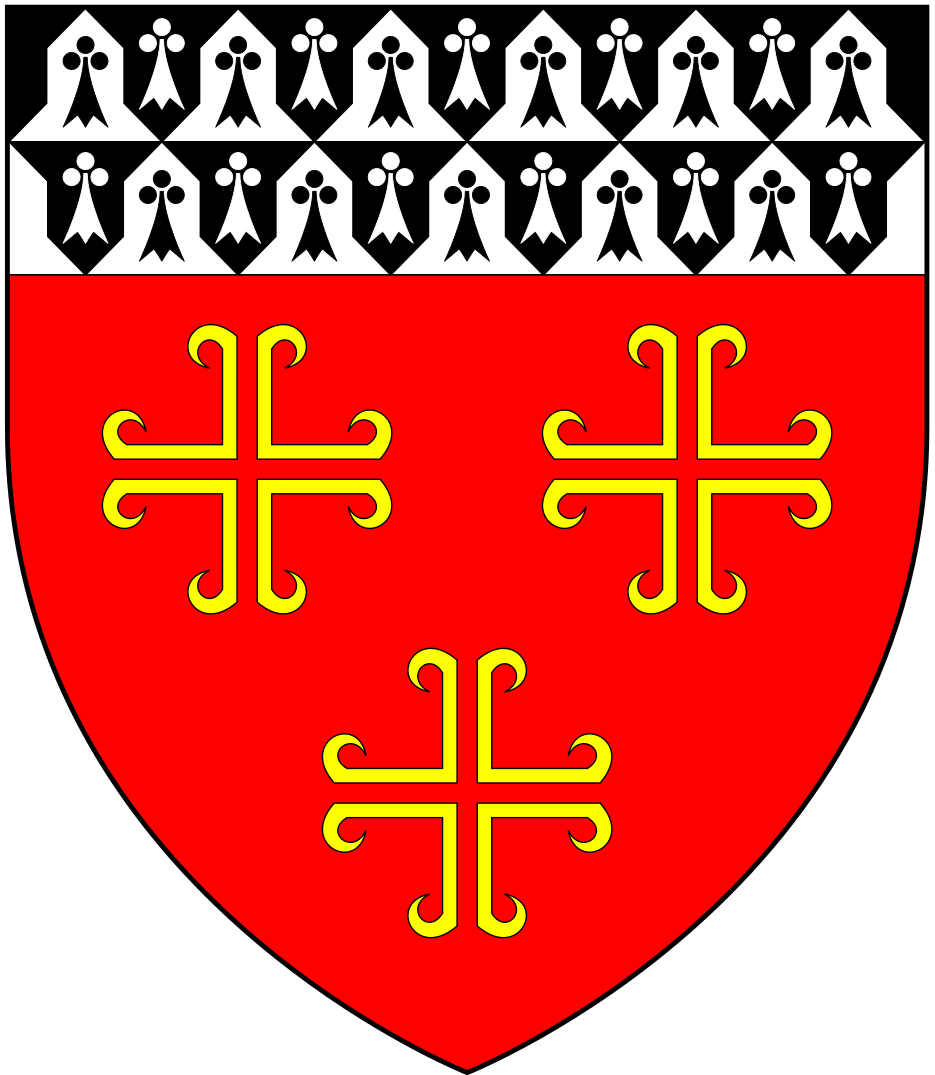
Arms of Verney: Gules, three crosses recerclée or a chief vair ermine and ermines

- Greville Verney, 7th Baron Willoughby de Broke (c.1586–1642)
- Greville Verney, 8th Baron Willoughby de Broke (c.1620–1648)
- Greville Verney, 9th Baron Willoughby de Broke (1649–1668)
- William Verney, 10th Baron Willoughby de Broke (1668–1683)
- Richard Verney, 11th Baron Willoughby de Broke (1621–1711)
- George Verney, 12th Baron Willoughby de Broke (1659–1728)
- Richard Verney, 13th Baron Willoughby de Broke (1693–1752)
- John Peyto-Verney, 14th Baron Willoughby de Broke (1738–1816)
- John Peyto-Verney, 15th Baron Willoughby de Broke (1762–1820)
- Henry Peyto-Verney, 16th Baron Willoughby de Broke (1773–1852)
- Robert John Verney, 17th Baron Willoughby de Broke (1809–1862)
- Henry Verney, 18th Baron Willoughby de Broke (1844–1902)
- Richard Greville Verney, 19th Baron Willoughby de Broke (1869–1923)
- John Henry Peyto Verney, 20th Baron Willoughby de Broke (1896–1986)
- Leopold David Verney, 21st Baron Willoughby de Broke (b. 1938)

The heir apparent is the present holder's son the Hon. Rupert Greville Verney (b. 1966).

== See also ==
- Baron Latimer
- Earl Brooke
