= John Cecil Russell =

British cavalry officer (1839–1909)

Major-General John Cecil Russell CVO
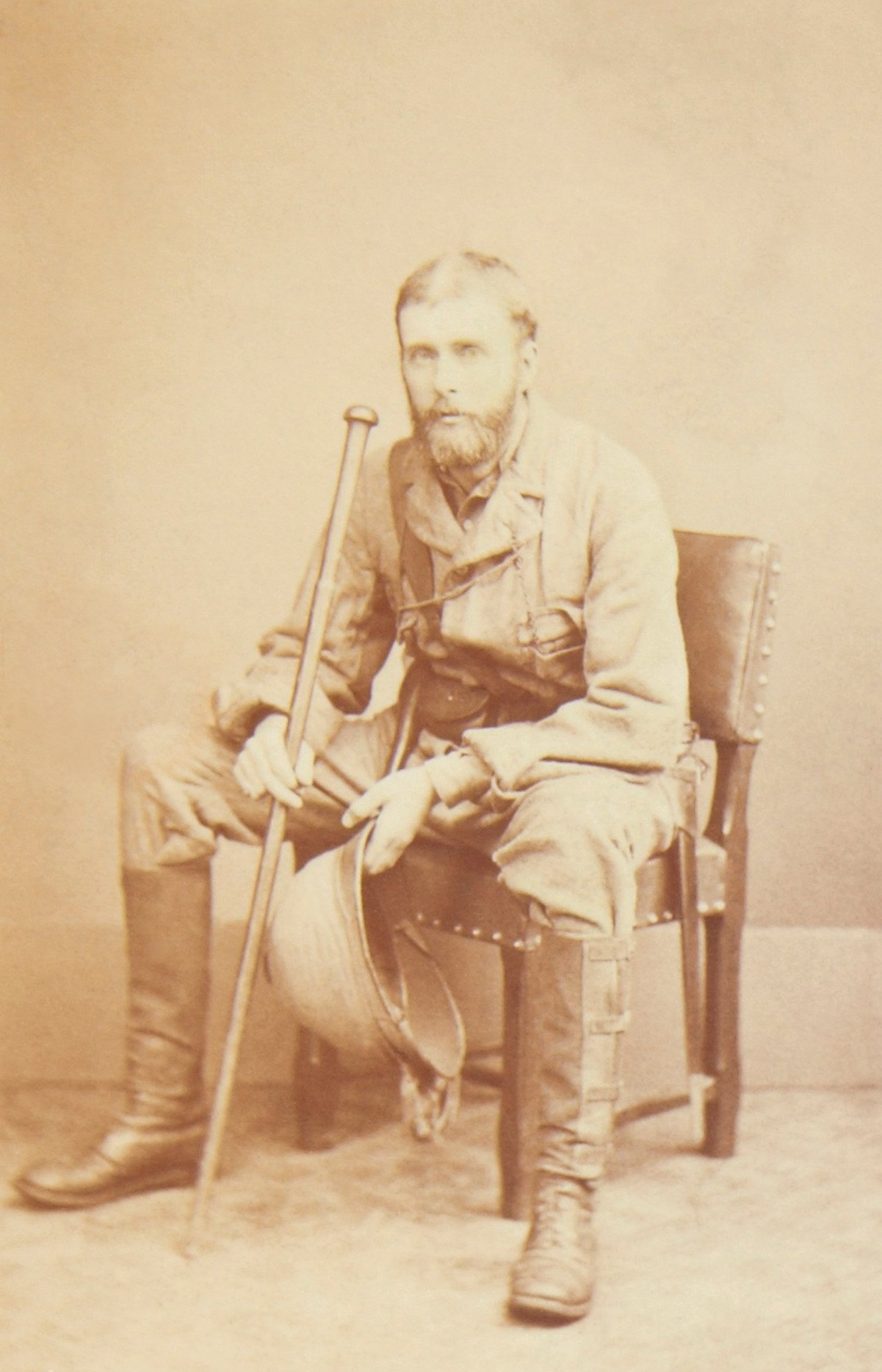
- Russell, pictured wearing the tropical field dress of the Ashanti War, 1874
- Born: 6 December 1839; Edinburgh, Scotland
- Died: 30 March 1909 (aged 69); Canterbury, Kent, England
- Relatives: Alexander James Russell (father); Hugh Burdett Money-Coutts, 6th Baron Latymer (son-in-law)
- Military career
- Allegiance: United Kingdom
- Branch: British Army
- Rank: Major-General
- Commands: 12th (The Prince of Wales's) Royal Regiment of Lancers (1881–1885); Cavalry depot, Canterbury (1887–1892)
- Conflicts: Third Anglo-Ashanti War (1873–1874); First Sekhukhune War (1879); Anglo-Zulu War (1879)
- Awards: Commander of the Royal Victorian Order

Major-General John Cecil Russell (6 December 1839 – 30 March 1909) was a British Army cavalry officer. While studying at New College, Oxford, Russell served in the university's Rifle Volunteer Corps. He purchased a commission in the 11th Light Dragoons in 1860 and almost immediately transferred to the 10th Light Dragoons. Russell rose to the rank of captain by purchase before transferring to the 12th (The Prince of Wales's) Royal Regiment of Lancers in 1872. Russell served with Major-General Garnet Wolseley in the 1873–1874 Anglo-Ashanti War and was considered a member of the Wolseley ring of men associated with the general. In 1875 he was appointed an equerry in waiting to Edward, Prince of Wales, and became an extra equerry in 1878.

Russell saw action in Southern Africa against the Pedi King Sekhukhune and, through his connections, received a post with the British forces for the Anglo-Zulu War of 1879, with the local rank of lieutenant-colonel. The British commander, Lord Chelmsford, appointed Russell to command the mounted contingent of the main Central Column. On the day of the British defeat at the Battle of Isandlwana, he was away with Chelmsford on a reconnaissance expedition. Russell was afterwards reassigned to Evelyn Wood's Left Column. On 28 March, Russell led part of the British force in the Battle of Hlobane, but was criticised for his perceived abandonment of a detachment commanded by Redvers Buller which was attacked by the Zulu. Russell's subordinate, Lieutenant Edward Browne, denounced Russell as a coward in a letter to Wood. At Wood's recommendation, Russell was removed from operations and assigned to a depot in the rear.

Russell returned to his regiment in 1880 and commanded them on a posting to India. He became a colonel in 1884 and from 1887 commanded a cavalry depot in Kent. He was promoted to major-general in 1895 and retired from the army in 1898. When the Prince of Wales acceded to the throne as Edward VII in 1901, Russell became an extra equerry to the king, and the following year was appointed Colonel of the Regiment of the 12th Lancers. He died at his home in Canterbury, Kent, and is buried in that city.

== Early career ==
Russell's crest

John Cecil Russell was born in Edinburgh on 6 December 1839, the only son of Alexander James Russell (Note: Alexander James Russell was a Scottish lawyer and headed a family firm that dated back to the end of the 17th century. An ancestor was a founding shareholder of the Bank of Scotland. He was a Writer to Her Majesty's Signet and a director of the Standard Life Assurance Company, John Watson's Institution and the National Bank of Scotland.) and Magdalene Stein. The family crest, derived from the Russells of Ashiesteel, was a fountain proper (a roundel with blue and white wavy bands) and the motto was agitatione purgatur (Latin for 'it is purified by motion'). Through his paternal grandmother Russell also had connections to the Murrays of Polmaise and the principal branch of Clan Robertson. Russell was educated privately before attending New College of the University of Oxford. He enlisted in the Oxford University Rifle Volunteer Corps and reached the rank of colour-serjeant before being commissioned as an ensign on 1 March 1860. Russell resigned his commission in the Rifle Volunteer Corps on 19 June 1860.

Russell purchased a commission as a cornet in the 11th Light Dragoons on 18 September 1860, (Note: Russell was one of 345 new officers to purchase their first commissions in 1860. Entry by purchase was the norm, there were exceptions for those commissioned from the ranks, orphans of military officers, pages of honour and cadets who achieved high marks in the final examinations at the Royal Military College, Sandhurst but these accounted for only 159 new officers in 1860. Russell would have been required to sit a very basic examination and to have the patronage of a member of the landed class. The regulation cost, paid to the government and reimbursable upon retirement, of a cornet's commission was £450 (equivalent to £62,550 in 2024).) and transferred to the 10th Light Dragoons on 16 October. (Note: Transfer between two regiments in the same rank was nominally free under army regulations but often required an illegal payment to the officer agreeing to the trade, particularly if their regiment was considered more desirable.) His regiment was then garrisoned in Norwich, England. It was renamed the 10th (The Prince of Wales's Own) Royal Hussars in 1861 and transferred to Yorkshire.

In 1863, the 10th Royal Hussars were posted as part of the garrison in Ireland where, on 28 June 1864 Russell was appointed an instructor of musketry. He purchased a lieutenant's commission in the regiment on 16 August 1864, (Note: Promotion up to and including the rank of lieutenant-colonel was by purchase in most cases, except where occasioned by the death of a senior officer. The opportunity to purchase promotion was offered to officers from within the regiment in order of seniority, provided they had the approval of the commanding officer. Russell would have had to pay the difference in the regulation prices between his cornet's commission and the lieutenant's commission, £250 (equivalent to £30,889 in 2024), and to have passed an examination.) and was appointed adjutant on 18 October, serving in that role until 2 April 1869. The 10th Royal Hussars were deployed in response to the Fenian Rising of 1867, but saw no action; they returned to England in 1868, being posted to the Aldershot Garrison. Later that year, Russell passed the examination for entry to the Staff College, ranking 19th out of 28 candidates, but there was space to admit only the top 16 candidates.

In June 1869, Russell was appointed aide-de-camp to the brigadier-general commanding the cavalry troops at the Aldershot Garrison. He purchased his captaincy in the 10th Royal Hussars on 28 May 1870. (Note: Russell was, by regulation, required to pass an examination to be eligible for promotion to captain, though this was not always enforced. He would have been required to pay the £1,100 (equivalent to £135,911 in 2024), difference in regulation price between the ranks. The purchase system was abolished by the Cardwell Reforms of 1871 and officers were reimbursed the regulation value of their current commission and an assessment of the market rate of their premium to transfer.) Russell transferred to the 12th (The Prince of Wales's) Royal Regiment of Lancers on 3 August 1872.

Russell wrote Notes on Cavalry Service, a military manual that was published by Cassell, Petter & Galpin in London in 1873. The book was written in the aftermath of the Franco-Prussian War where infantry, armed with breechloading rifles, demonstrated their ability to rapidly shoot down charging cavalry. Russell concluded that cavalry remained valuable for reconnaissance work, for screening other units and for exploiting opportunities quickly; but also recognised the value of mounted infantry, which could rapidly redeploy on the battlefield by horse before dismounting to lay down fire with rifles or carbines. He recommended that new units be raised to carry out the mounted infantry role so as not to dilute the "cavalry spirit" of the existing units.

From 5 December 1873, Russell participated in the 1873–1874 Anglo-Ashanti War. From the time of his arrival in the Gold Coast colony, Russell served as aide-de-camp to Brigadier-General Sir Archibald Alison and was present during the Battle of Amoaful, the Battle of Ordashu and the capture of Kumasi. From 9 February to 20 March 1874, he served as deputy assistant-adjutant and quartermaster-general. Russell came to the attention of the overall British commander, Major-General Garnet Wolseley, for his achievements as staff officer. He became a member of the Wolseley ring of officers who supported the general's attempts to reform the army and who benefited from Wolseley's patronage, being preferred over other officers when opportunities for promotion arose.

Russell was twice mentioned in despatches for his service in the Ashanti War, by Wolseley on 7 and 17 March 1874, and received promotion to the brevet rank of major on 1 April 1874. He was appointed an equerry in waiting to Edward, Prince of Wales on 1 March 1875. Russell's regiment was posted to India in 1877, but he remained at court. He resigned his position as equerry on 5 July 1878 to seek active service but was retained by Edward in the honorary role of extra equerry.

Russell was sent to the recently-annexed Transvaal on special duties, arriving on 29 May 1878, and fought in the First Sekhukhune War against the Pedi people. The Pedi chief Sekhukhune had refused to accept British rule and his forces attacked rebellious elements of the Maserumule client state, Boer settlers and British police. The British campaign under Colonel Hugh Rowlands was largely static in nature with a string of fortified posts established around the Pedi territory, but a British advance towards Sekhukhune's capital of Tsate was launched in August. Rowlands was hampered by Pedi skirmishing tactics, difficult terrain and drought conditions, and the British offensive was called off in late October. After British troops were withdrawn, Sekhukhune resumed his raids until he was captured by a renewed British campaign, the Second Sekhukhune War, in December 1879.

== Zulu War ==
=== Appointment ===
Through his royal connections and friendship with Lieutenant-General Frederic Thesiger, 2nd Baron Chelmsford, Russell gained a place with the British forces assembling for the 1879 Anglo-Zulu War. Although Russell had no experience leading cavalry in action, Chelmsford placed him in command of the mounted elements of the Centre Column, the principal component of the British forces involved in the first invasion of Zululand. Chelmsford also arranged for Russell to be appointed to the local rank of lieutenant-colonel.

Part of Russell's command was a force of around 100 Imperial Mounted Infantry, consisting of troops with riding experience seconded from the infantry regiments of the invasion force. This unit was led by Lieutenant Edward Browne of the 24th Regiment of Foot, who was well-liked, and his subordination to Russell caused resentment among the mounted infantry. The majority of Russell's command was formed of volunteer units raised by the Colony of Natal; these soldiers had expected to be commanded by John Dartnell of the Natal Mounted Police, a former British Army major and Indian Mutiny veteran who had become a farmer in the colony. The colonial volunteers, who had no obligation to serve outside Natal, had agreed to join Chelmsford's forces on the condition that they approved of their commander. When Russell was appointed, all the officers resigned in protest. The events were reported by newspapers in Pietermaritzburg and caused embarrassment for Chelmsford. His solution was to declare Dartnell was invaluable to him as an adviser and to appoint him to a position on his staff, while Russell retained command of the units in the field. The Natal Mounted Police officers rescinded their resignations as a personal favour to Dartnell.

=== First invasion ===
Russell commanded the Imperial Mounted Infantry in the first action of the war, the 12 January 1879 action at Sihayo's Kraal, encircling and defeating a small Zulu force. Three days later, while engineers improved the road to ease the progress of the column inland, Russell commanded a scouting party seeking the next camp site. He reported the plain at Isandlwana provided good sources of water and firewood and Chelmsford approved the location. On 18 January, Russell and his entire command set off on a patrol northwards into the area between the Centre Column and Colonel Evelyn Wood's Left Column, as a show of strength. Russell led the vanguard in the column's 20 January advance to the camp at Isandlwana.

On 22 January, Chelmsford led a portion of the Centre Column on a reconnaissance in force from Isandlwana to Mangeni Falls. Despite his official position as a staff officer, Dartnell was placed in command of the Natal mounted volunteers, reducing Russell's command to the Imperial Mounted Infantry. While the reconnaissance force was away from the camp, the remainder of the Centre Column were attacked by the Zulu and wiped out in the Battle of Isandlwana.

Around the time of the battle, Russell's squadron discovered a numerically superior Zulu force on Isipezi Hill, which lay between Chelmsford's force and the camp, and withdrew without engaging. Russell then received word from Commandant George Hamilton-Browne of the Natal Native Contingent that he could see the camp was under attack and Russell reported this in person to Chelmsford. Chelmsford ordered Russell to ride to the camp; he found a force of around 7,000 Zulus in possession of the camp and reported back to the general that "all was as bad as it could be".

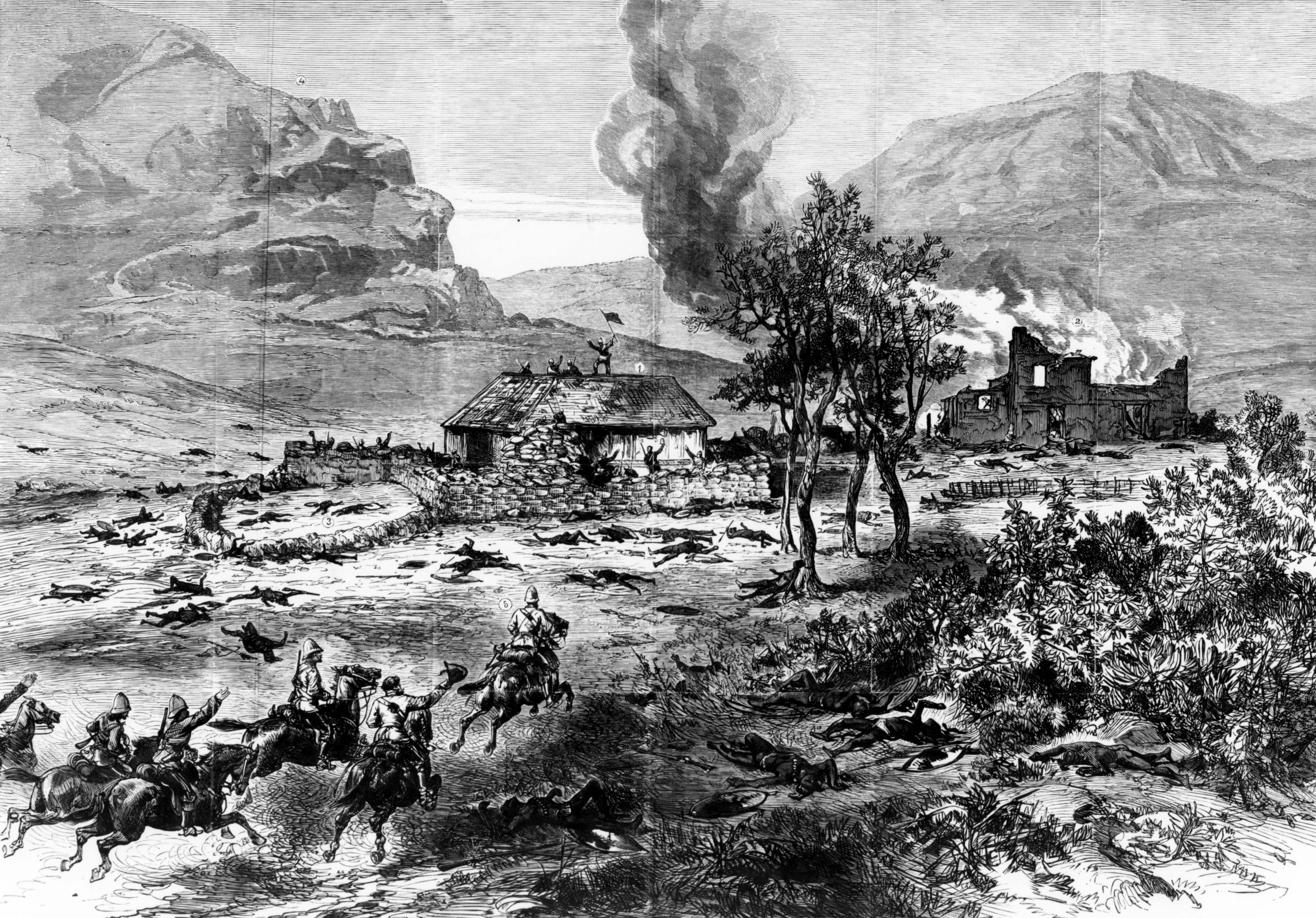
A two-page spread in the Illustrated London News of 8 March 1879 depicts Russell at the head of the relief force arriving at Rorke's Drift.

When Chelmsford's force retook the camp unopposed on the evening of 22 January, Russell and the Imperial Mounted Infantry formed part of the right flank of the advance. The group spent an uneasy night on the battlefield, sleeping fitfully among the bodies of the dead, which included eleven of Russell's mounted infantry he had left at the camp. Early the next morning, Chelmsford's force moved back into Natal to the British supply post at Rorke's Drift. Unsure if it had been lost to a Zulu attack, Russell led the Imperial Mounted Infantry forward to investigate. Finding the post in British hands, he was with the first group to enter the position. He afterwards rode on to confirm the supply base at Helpmekaar also remained in British hands.

In the following weeks, Russell was stationed at Helpmekaar with responsibility for co-ordinating mounted patrols of the frontier but lost interest in the work, his confidence and that of other officers shaken by the disaster at Isandlwana. His men had also lost all their kit and wagons at Isandlwana and their farriers were among the British dead. Russell's patrols were sporadic and ill-planned, and one of Chelmsford's staff officers, Major Francis Clery, criticised Russell for allowing the Zulus to roam at will. Clery wrote to Alison to state "I fear, between ourselves, that Russell was a little unnerved by Isandlwana, for a few days after he went to the general recommending that the whole of the mounted infantry should be disbanded, as they appeared demoralised and wished to go to their regiments". On 7 February, Chelmsford wrote to Wood "Russell appears to have lost heart and has allowed his men to get out of hand I fear".

=== Hlobane and Kambula ===
After Isandlwana, Chelmsford requested reinforcements before attempting a second invasion. During the pause in operations, on 15 February 1879, Russell was sent in command of the squadron of Imperial Mounted Infantry to Wood's Left Column. Russell took almost a month to reach Wood's camp at Kambula and was criticised for his slow progress by Chelmsford and Wood; the latter noted Russell was "in the dismals" and "his frame of mind cannot be good". When he joined the Left Column, in addition to his mounted infantry, Russell was given command of the Edendale detachment of the Natal Native Horse, which had survived the Battle of Isandlwana.

On 14 March, Wood sent Lieutenant-Colonel Redvers Buller, commanding a force of irregular horse, 50 miles (80 km) into Zululand to rescue around 1,000 dependents of Zulu chief uHamu, who had defected to the British. The following day, Russell rode out with his mounted infantry and some mules to help transport the women and children into the British camp. Although all three men were considered members of the Wolseley Ring and had served on the Ashanti campaign, Wood was wary of Russell, whose cautious approach to operations contrasted with Buller. On 27 March, Chelmsford's military secretary, Henry Hope Crealock, wrote to Russell to inform him his local rank was being rescinded and he was to revert to his brevet rank of major. This undermined Russell's position among the officers of Wood's column and he was outraged when he received this letter on 11 April.

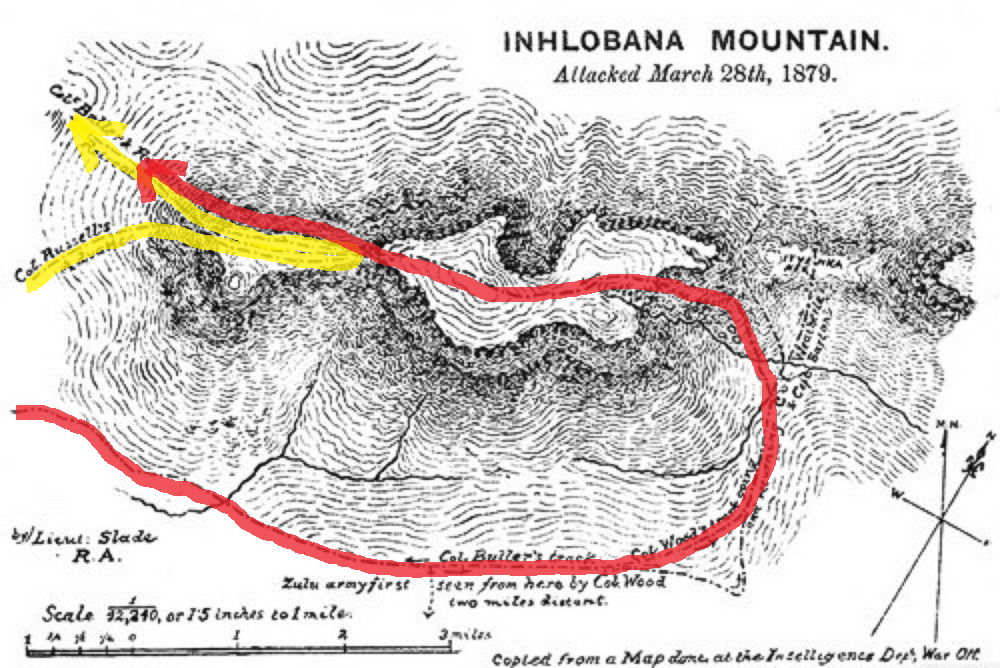
British movements at Hlobane. Russell's advance to Devil's Pass via Ntendeka and withdrawal in yellow. Buller's approach up Hlobane from the east and withdrawal via Devil's Pass in red.

In late March, Wood ordered Russell and Buller to attack Hlobane, a mountain stronghold of the AbaQulusi Zulu clan. At 4 am on 28 March, Russell left camp with a party of 640, which included his mounted infantry and Natal Native Horse, but also the irregular Kaffrarian Rifles and some African auxiliary infantry. Reaching the mountain around dawn, Wood's orders were for Russell to ascend the Ntendeka Mountain to the west, and to pass onto Hlobane by Devil's Pass. Buller's men were to ascend from east of Hlobane. On reaching Devil's Pass, Russell considered it impassable for horses and sent Lieutenant Edward Browne and a party of dismounted men to Buller to warn him of this, though Browne was unable to locate Buller. While Russell's men were seizing Zulu cattle on Ntendeka, they spotted the main Zulu army approaching from the southeast and Russell sent a message to alert Wood to this.

The Zulu secured the eastern flank of Hlobane, leaving Devil's Pass as Buller's only escape route. Russell meanwhile had withdrawn to the base of Ntendeka, where he considered he could support a withdrawal by Buller along the south side of Hlobane. Russell then received a message from Wood, who thought him still on the mountain, ordering him to move to "Zunguin Nek", from where he could cover Buller's retreat. "Nek" is a Southern African term for a ridge of land connecting two peaks. Wood intended his order to refer to the ridge connecting Ntendeka to Zungwini Mountain, but Russell, who was already very close to this location, interpreted the order as requiring him to take up position on the ridge connecting Zungwini to Kambula mountain, 4 miles (6.4 km) further to the west and of no use to Buller. Buller's unit descended Devil's Pass, covered only by Browne's small party which had remained on the Ntendeka. Buller's men were harried closely during their retreat and suffered heavy casualties before reaching Russell's force and returning to Kambula. Russell's quick withdrawal had also left behind his auxiliary infantry, 80 of whom were killed.

On the following day, 29 March, the Zulu attacked the British camp in the Battle of Kambula. With the Zulu army assembled before the British post, Russell's mounted contingent were ordered to provoke the Zulus into attacking the camp by riding to within 100 yards (91 m) of the Zulu and opening fire. When the Zulu charged, some of Russell's soldiers struggled to remount and he rode to the aid of a trooper of the Frontier Light Horse. Russell was unhorsed in the confusion and had to be rescued by Lieutenant Browne; troops of the Natal Native Horse saved the dismounted trooper. Browne received the Victoria Cross and Russell was commended by Wood to Chelmsford, though it is likely later communications from Wood and Buller persuaded him no medal was warranted. After the Zulu were defeated in a fruitless assault on the camp, the mounted troops participated in the pursuit of the retreating force. Buller, in the thick of the pursuit, told Crealock he had to ride a mile (1.6 km) back to assume command of Russell's unit after he refused to advance, fearful of exposing his flanks.

In his formal report on the battle of Hlobane, Wood criticised Russell's actions and came close to accusing him of cowardice. Buller and Browne were furious with Russell. On the day of the Battle of Kambula, Russell had apologised to Buller, saying: "you are quite right. My metier is not South African fighting". Buller told Russell he would never serve on a joint operation with him again. A week after the battle, Wood wrote to Crealock noting his lack of faith in Russell as a reconnaissance officer for failing to report on two companies of British infantry who had been threatened with attack by a large Zulu force. On 10 April, Browne handed a letter to Wood denouncing Russell for cowardice at Hlobane and stating he and his men would never serve under him again. Wood forwarded the letter to Chelmsford and recommended Russell be removed from operations and assigned to the remount depot in the rear at Pietermaritzburg; the general concurred and issued the order. The mounted infantry served under Buller's command for the rest of the war. Russell returned to Britain on 4 October 1879. He was mentioned in despatches four times during the war and, despite the controversy, was rewarded on 29 November 1879 with appointment to the brevet rank of lieutenant-colonel.

== Later career ==
Russell pictured in his later career

Russell returned to the 12th Lancers in his substantive rank of captain on 8 May 1880, when the regiment was still garrisoned in India. He was promoted to major on 5 June 1880 and to lieutenant-colonel on 1 July 1881, receiving command of the regiment. He was promoted to colonel on 7 February 1884 and ceased to command the regiment in 1885, being placed on half pay. In 1887, he was appointed to command the cavalry depot at Canterbury, Kent, a post he held for five years. He was promoted to major-general on 26 March 1895 and retired from the army in July 1898.

Upon the Prince of Wales's accession to the throne as Edward VII in early 1901, Russell was appointed as an extra equerry to the king. He was appointed to the honorary position of Colonel of the Regiment of the 12th Lancers on 2 April 1902. A contemporary article in the Evening Despatch considered that this removed the stain on Russell's reputation arising from Hlobane, and noted Field Marshal Frederick Roberts, 1st Earl Roberts, who was Commander-in-Chief of the Forces, had supported the appointment. Russell was appointed a Commander of the Royal Victorian Order on 9 November 1902; appointments to the order are the personal gift of the British monarch.

== Personal life and death ==
Russell married Hester Frances, the daughter of the Reverend Charles Thornhill, at Castlebellingham in Ireland on 11 March 1869; the bride's father carried out the marriage service. The couple had seven daughters born between 1869 and 1888, including the artist Joan Russell. Russell's fourth daughter, Hester Frances, married the banker and future Baron Latymer Hugh Burdett Money-Coutts, on 11 June 1900.

During his period commanding the Canterbury depot, Russell lived at the Hoystings, a house in the city. After he left Canterbury, Russell lived for a while on the Isle of Mull in Scotland, and at Bramford Hall in Suffolk, where Arthur Conan Doyle visited him to take part in the shooting of game birds. In 1902, Russell returned to Canterbury, where he lived at Barton Court and served as a Justice of the Peace. He died at his home on 30 March 1909 while recovering from an operation he had undergone in London. Russell's funeral was held at St Martin's Church, Canterbury, and he is buried in the city.

== Bibliography ==
- Notes on Cavalry Service. London: Cassell, Petter & Galpin. 1873.

== Sources ==
- Bruce, Anthony Peter Charles (1980). The Purchase System in the British Army, 1660–1871. London: Royal Historical Society. ISBN 978-0-901050-57-1 – via Internet Archive.
- Burke, John (1839). A Genealogical and Heraldic Dictionary of the Peerage and Baronetage of the British Empire. London: Colburn. OCLC 457007026.
- Caramello, Charles (2022). Riding to Arms: A History of Horsemanship and Mounted Warfare. Lexington, Kentucky: University Press of Kentucky. ISBN 978-0-8131-8232-2.
- Castle, Ian (March 2000). "The 'Wretched' Campaign of JC Russell, 12th Lancers: Zululand 1879". Soldiers of the Queen (100): 12–20. ISSN 0143-5515.
- Council of Military Education (1868). Report on the Examination for Admission to the Staff College, Held in July, 1868. London: Taylor and Francis.
- David, Saul (2004). Zulu: The Heroism and Tragedy of the Zulu War. London: Penguin. ISBN 978-0-670-91474-6.
- Fairbairn, James (1993). Fairbairn's Book of Crests of the Families of Great Britain and Ireland. Baltimore, Maryland: Genealogical Publishing Company. ISBN 978-0-8063-0107-5.
- Greaves, Adrian (2005). Crossing the Buffalo: The Zulu War of 1879. London: Cassell. ISBN 978-0-3043-6725-2.
- Greaves, Adrian (2012). Rorke's Drift. London: Cassell. ISBN 978-1-78022-497-8.
- Greaves, Adrian; Knight, Ian (2006). Who's Who in the Zulu War, 1879: The British. Barnsley, South Yorkshire: Pen & Sword. ISBN 1-84415-479-3.
- Knight, Ian (2004). The National Army Museum Book of the Zulu War. London: Pan Books. ISBN 033-0-48629-2.
- Laband, John (2009). Historical Dictionary of the Zulu Wars. Lanham, Maryland: Scarecrow Press. ISBN 978-0-8108-6300-2.
- Laband, John (2023). In the Shadow of Isandlwana: The Life and Times of General Lord Chelmsford and his Disaster in Zululand. Barnsley, South Yorkshire: Greenhill Books. ISBN 978-1-78438-771-6.
- Liddell, Robert Spencer (1891). The Memoirs of the Tenth Royal Hussars (Prince of Wales's Own): Historical and Social. London: Longmans, Green, and Company.
- Lodge, Edmund (1907). The Peerage, Baronetage, Knightage & Companionage of the British Empire for 1907. London: Kelly's Directories. OCLC 7102550.
- Manning, Stephen (2024). Sir Garnet Wolseley: Soldier of Empire. Barnsley, South Yorkshire: Pen and Sword. ISBN 978-1-3990-7247-2.
- Morris, Donald R. (1965). The Washing of the Spears. New York: Pen and Sword. ISBN 067-1-63108-X.
- Snook, Mike (2010a). Like Wolves on the Fold: The Defence of Rorke's Drift. London: Frontline Books. ISBN 978-1-84832-602-6.
- Snook, Mike (2010b). How Can Man Die Better. London: Frontline Books. ISBN 978-1-84832-581-4.
- Stapleton, Timothy J., ed. (2016). Encyclopedia of African Colonial Conflicts. Santa Barbara, California: ABC-CLIO. ISBN 978-1-59884-837-3.
- Stewart, Patrick Findlater (1950). The History of the XII Royal Lancers (Prince of Wales's). London: Oxford University Press.
