= Alexander James Russell =

Scottish lawyer

Alexander James Russell WS FRSE (1814–1887) was a Scottish lawyer.

== Life ==
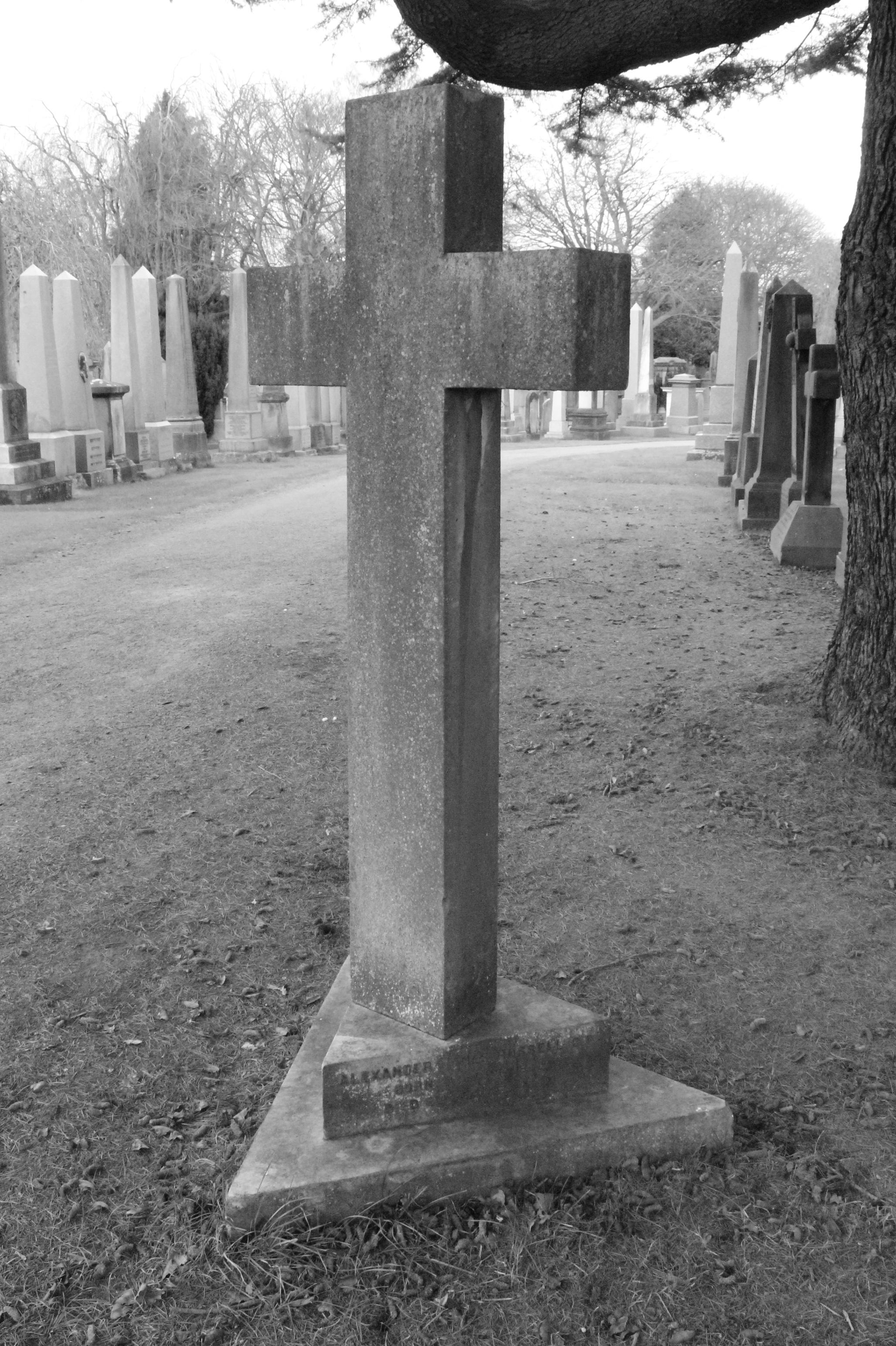
The grave of Alexander James Russell, Dean Cemetery

He was born at 101 George Street in Edinburgh on 21 June 1814, the son of John Russell FRSE Writer to the Signet. He was apprenticed to his father as a lawyer and qualified as a Writer too the Signet in 1837.

By 1840 he appears as a Clerk to the Signet (CS) living at 9 Shandwick Place at the west end of Princes Street. By 1850 he is in partnership with his father as "J & A J Russell CS".

In 1852 he was elected a Fellow of the Royal Society of Edinburgh. His proposer was James Thomson Gibson-Craig.

By 1860 his father had retired and moved to the "south Bank" of Canaan Lane in the Morningside district.

A few years after his father's death he went into business with James Nicolson to create the new firm of Russell & Nicolson at 11 George Street. The firm later evolved into Russell & Dunlop.

He died at Shandwick Place in Edinburgh on 8 January 1887. He is buried in Dean Cemetery.

== Family ==
He was married twice: firstly in 1839 to Magdalene Stein (1820-1857) and secondly in 1861 to Elizabeth Anne Lancaster (1835-1903), twenty years his junior. His son, born 1839, was army officer John Cecil Russell.
