= Death by Magic =

American reality magic series on Netflix

- Genre: Reality
- Starring: Drummond Money-Coutts
- Country of origin: United States
- Original language: English
- No. of seasons: 1
- No. of episodes: 8

Production
- Executive producers: Simon Dinsell; Toby Gorman; Arthur Smith; Martin Turner
- Editor: Andrew Payne
- Running time: 30–38 minutes
- Production company: A. Smith & Co. Productions

Original release
- Network: Netflix
- Release: November 30, 2018

Death by Magic is an American reality television show. The eight-episode first season premiered on Netflix on November 30, 2018. The series stars and was created by British magician Drummond Money-Coutts. It features Money-Coutts researching the myths and legends behind magic tricks and stunts that allegedly led to a performer's death. After learning the details of the original stunt gone wrong, Money-Coutts attempts to recreate the performance.

== Episodes ==
No.	Title	Original release date
1	"CAPE TOWN: The Great Escape"	November 30, 2018
Drummond attempts to recreate a stunt performed in the 1930s by Karr the Mysterious; escaping a straitjacket and a moving vehicle within 60 seconds. He is investigating the case with help from College of Magic in Cape Town. His final trick to re-enact the stunt of Charles Rowan is escaping a straitjacket inside a box locked with chains and lock on the way of an upcoming locomotive train within 60 seconds.
2	"MIAMI: Head Under Water"	November 30, 2018
In this episode, DMC tries a modernized "underwater escape", whilst also confronting his childhood fear of aquaphobia. The same stunt was done in 1930 by a former magician named Gilbert Genesta, who drowned to death in the process. He gets help from a retired Navy SEAL to learn how to overcome panic and fear being underwater. His final trick is to escape from handcuffs inside a vintage car filled with water.
3	"DETROIT: Death by Audience"	November 30, 2018
This is an episode paid tribute to the legendary Harry Houdini, where the power of life and death is in the audience's hands; unlike Houdini, who, after a brutal attack from an audience member, died of a ruptured appendix following his final performance at the Garrick Theatre in the late 1920s. The final trick is to lead the audiences to choose which rope to be cut, preventing Drummond from being crushed to death at the hands of the audience.
4	"LONDON: Buried Alive"	November 30, 2018
Drummond goes back to his roots where he reenacts a deadly trick performed in 1990 by The Amazing Joe Burrus; being buried alive. He learned the story of Joe Burrus from his sons who witnessed the event years ago. While in London, Drummond learns about the fear of buried alive and safe coffins, eventually applying those to his re-enactment final trick. Also, Drummond tells about his family history and his first discovery of magic.
5	"LAS VEGAS: Against the Odds"	November 30, 2018
Drummond travels to Las Vegas, Nevada in an attempt to recreate the most dangerous trick in magic history - the bullet catch. This trick is in honor of Doc Conrad, who got shot while performing the trick. His final trick involving Drummond to stand behind a target range with his appointed shooter to not pick the gun which is loaded among six guns.
6	"INDIA: The Rope Trick"	November 30, 2018
Drummond goes to Udaipur, India, where he pursues his passion in magic after escaping his family's legacy years ago. He is investigating the myth of an Indian rope trick whether if it is real or not. After the investigation, he will perform his interpretation of the rope trick - bound with rope inside a metal cage with swords suspended on a burning rope above the burning spikes below.
7	"EDINBURGH: Trial by Fire"	November 30, 2018
In Edinburgh, Drummond investigates the death of magician Sigmund Neuberger, also known as "The Great Lafayette". He is inspired by the rich history of witch hunting in Scotland back in 1597 - trial by fire. Due to heavy snowfall in Scotland, Drummond cannot perform his final trick there, so he performs in Simi Valley, California instead.
8	"LOS ANGELES: Daredevil"	November 30, 2018
In this final episode, Drummond recreates stunt performed by Karel Soucek, Canadian daredevil who had conquered the Niagara Falls, but died in his stunt at Los Angeles. After learning from a Hollywood stunt supervisor, Drummond is confident enough to perform his final trick - plummeting in a wooden barrel to a small pool of water.
