= Money (surname) =

Money is a surname. Notable people with the surname include:

- C. V. Money (1901−1977), American college sports coach
- Della Money, British speech and language therapist
- Don Money (born 1949), American baseball player
- Eddie Money (1949–2019), stage name of Edward Mahoney, American rock singer and songwriter
- Eldon A. Money (1930–2020), American politician, farmer, and rancher
- Ernle Money (1931–2013), English Conservative politician, MP for Ipswich
- Griffin Money (1865–1958), Australian politician
- Hernando Money (1839–1912), American politician in Mississippi
- Jerry H. Money (1946−1990), American politician
- John Money (1921−2006), New Zealander-American psychologist
- Ken Money (1935−2023), Canadian astronaut and scientist
- Leo Chiozza Money (1870−1945), Italian-born British economist and politician
- Monte Money, American musician, founding member of Escape The Fate
- Richard Money (born 1955), English footballer and football manager
- Walter Money (1848–1924), English clergyman and cricketer
- William Taylor Money (1769–1834), English East India company navy captain and MP
- Zoot Money (born George Bruno Money; 1942–2024), British musician and actor

== See also ==
- James Kyrle-Money (1775−1843), British soldier
- Money-Coutts family
