= Monica Storrs =

Monica Melanie Storrs (February 12, 1888 – December 14, 1967) was a British-born Canadian pioneer and Anglican missionary.

She was born at St Peter's Vicarage, Grosvenor Gardens, in the City of Westminster, London to John Storrs and Lucy née Cust. Her elder brother was Ronald Storrs.

Monica, at two years of age, developed a medical condition which left her unable to walk for ten years. Not physically capable of attending school during this time, her parents educated her themselves. She was later educated at Francis Holland School and St Christopher's College, Blackheath, London.

After her parents died, Storrs, although educated for upper-class English life, arrived in Fort St John, British Columbia in October 1929 as the Great Depression began. She was the first missionary to teach Sunday school and take regular Christian services. The group of women, the Companions of the Peace, were funded by the Fellowship of the Maple Leaf (which still promotes links between churches in Canada and the United Kingdom.)

Although only intending to work for one year, she stayed as missionary for more than 21 years in Peace River Country, British Columbia. She was nicknamed 'God's Galloping Girl' for her marathon rides in all weathers and over rough terrain, to visit remote farm families and promote their welfare. "...we had another mile across stubble fields and between hundreds of ghostly stooks. Once I charged straight upon a barbed wire fence, and was nearly impaled..."

Storrs and the other workers were all women, and sometimes regarded as feminist pioneers. Their pioneer chapel is preserved at Fort St John as part of the North Peace Museum, where it has been restored.

She left Peace Country in 1950 to return to England, where she lived at Peacewood, Farther Common, Liss, Hampshire. She continued her work until 1967, when she had a stroke and died.
