= Tom Lyon =

British escapologist and magician

Tom Lyon is a British escapologist and magician.

== Background ==
Lyon wanted to be an escapologist from a very early age, picking toy handcuffs with a toothpick. He attended Eton College in the 1990s, where he met fellow magician Drummond Money-Coutts with whom he reformed the Eton College Magic Society, hosting such performers as Uri Geller. Whilst at Eton, he performed on many TV programs, such as Ant & Dec's Saturday Night Takeaway, Richard & Judy, MAGIC, Revolver, Blue Peter (five times), Innovation Nation, Xchange and several international television programs. On one episode of Richard & Judy he got out of a straitjacket and undid his handcuffs in 1 minute and 53 seconds, and then, in under 3 seconds, got out of handcuffs he was wearing and tied Richard and Judy together. He has also been featured in several newspaper articles. He made front page news in America in 2004 when he escaped from a vault.

Lyon became the youngest member of The Magic Circle while still at school, being accepted into the society without having to audition. On leaving school in 2004 he travelled to Italy and France where he focused on close up sleight-of-hand magic. In 2006, he matriculated into Oriel College, Oxford. To concentrate on his studies, he left the public eye, although continues to perform at private engagements. Along with Drummond Money-Coutts, he toured Kenya performing magic in 2007, and a DVD, Kenyan Conjurations, was produced about their exploits. The advertising copy reads: "In August 2007, two English magicians travelled to Kenya and performed their mini-miracles wherever they went. They were chased by prostitutes, bribed to cheat in a casino and gave one man a seizure. This is their story." The profits from the DVD will fund the building of a new school in Kenya.

In August 2008, Lyon toured China with Money-Coutts to film a second DVD, this time raising money for a Chinese Children's charity. While in Asia, they also performed for the Olympic Handover Party at London House, Beijing. Lyon performed for the British Ambassador to China at his residence.

== See also ==
- Escapology
- Drummond Money-Coutts
- Eton College
