= Veney (surname) =

Veney is a surname. Notable people with the surname include:

- Bethany Veney (c. 1813–1916), American slave and memoirist
- John Veney (1889–1955), American Negro league catcher in the 1910s
- Keith Veney (born 1974), American basketball player
