= William Latimer, 1st Baron Latimer =

English baron and soldier

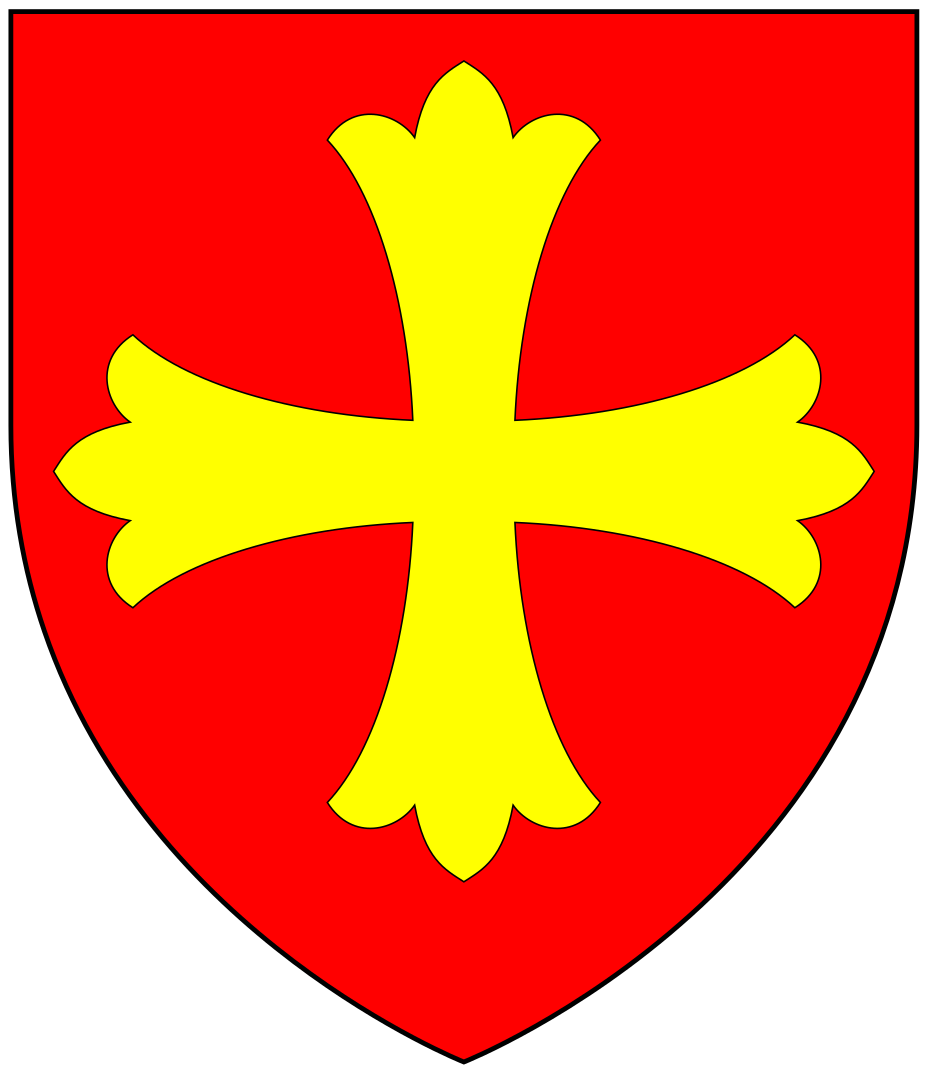
Coat of arms of William Latimer, Lord of Corby, Gules, a cross patonce Or.

William le Latimer (died 5 December 1304), Lord of Corby and Billinges was an English noble. He was a crusader and served in English campaigns in Wales, Gascony, France and Scotland.

== Biography ==
William was the eldest son of William le Latimer and Alice Hansard. He took the cross in 1271 and went on Prince Edward's campaign to the Holy Land and was summoned to serve in Wales in December 1276 and again in May 1282. At the defeat of the English at Menai Straits on 6 November 1282, he escaped the rout of the English forces by riding through the midst of the waves.

He was present in parliament on 29 May 1290, however his the first recorded writ of summons is dated 29 December 1299. In April 1292, William was summoned to attend at Norham equipped for the field. He sailed in the expedition for Gascony which left Plymouth on 3 October 1292, reaching Chatillon on 23 October. At the beginning of 1295, Latimer was in command at Rions and seems to have remained in Gascony till 1297, after which he was employed in Scotland, and was present at the Battle of Stirling Bridge on 10 September 1297, when the English were defeated by William Wallace.

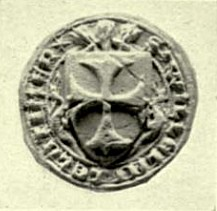
Seal of William Latimer, 1st Baron Latimer (died 1305), affixed to the Barons' Letter of 1301 to the Pope, in which he is called Will(elmu)s le Latimer D(omi)n(u)s de Corby ("William le Latimer Lord of Corby"), his seal showing a cross patonce

In 1298 he accompanied Edward I to Scotland, and was present at the battle of Falkirk on 22 July. In August, Latimer was in command at Berwick Castle. The following year, in April, he was appointed a commissioner to treat for the exchange of prisoners, and was one of those summoned to attend the council at York in July for the consideration of the affairs of Scotland. In July, he was engaged in a raid into Galloway, and in August was again at Berwick, being at this time the king's lieutenant in the Marches. William was at the siege of Caerlaverock, appointed in October 1300 again as keeper of Berwick and in September 1302 was in command at Roxburgh Castle. In February 1301, he was present in the parliament at Lincoln, and was one of the barons who signed the Baron's Letter to Pope Boniface VIII. The seal of William Latimer, 1st Baron Latimer, affixed to the Barons' Letter of 1301 to the Pope, displays the original arms of Latimer: Gules, a cross patonce or.

Latimer died on 5 December 1304, and was buried at Empingham, Rutland. He was succeeded by his eldest son William. His wife Alice died in 1316.

== Marriage and issue ==
William married Alice, elder daughter and co-heiress of Walter Ledet, Lord of Braybrooke and Ermentrude de Lisle. The wardship of Alice and her sister Christiana was held by the father of William Latimer, who married them to his sons. William and Alice had the following issue:

- William Latimer, married Lucy de Thweng, had issue.
- John Latimer (died 1299), married Isabel de Sherstede, without issue.
- Joan Latimer (died 1308), married Alexander Comyn, had issue.
- Christina Latimer, married Robert de Bosco, had issue.
