= John Coutts =

John Coutts may refer to:

- John Coutts (merchant) (1699–1750), Scottish merchant and banker
- John Coutts (pilot), former world number one gliding champion
- John Coutts (shipbuilder) (1810–1862), Scottish shipbuilding pioneer
- John Coutts aka John Willie (1902–1962) artist, fetish photographer, editor and the publisher
- John J. Coutts (born 1934), Scottish poet
- John Coutts (swimmer) (born 1955), former competitive swimmer from New Zealand
