= Thomas Burdett Money-Coutts, 7th Baron Latymer =

English aristocrat (1901–1987)

- Born: Thomas Burdett Money-Coutts; 6 August 1901
- Died: 24 May 1987 (aged 85)
- Title: Baron Latymer
- Predecessor: Hugh Burdett Money-Coutts, 6th Baron Latymer
- Successor: Hugo Money-Coutts, 8th Baron Latymer

Thomas Burdett Money-Coutts, 7th Baron Latymer (6 August 1901 – 24 May 1987) was an English peer. He inherited the title Baron Latymer from his father, Hugh Burdett Money-Coutts, 6th Baron Latymer.

Money-Coutts was educated at Radley College and Trinity College, Oxford. A banker by profession, he was also for forty years Vice Chairman of the board for the Middlesex Hospital. In 1925, he married Patience née Courtenay-Thompson: they had two daughters and one son, his heir Hugo.

Peerage of England
Preceded by Hugh Burdett Money-Coutts	Baron Latymer; 1949–1987	Succeeded by Hugo Money-Coutts
