= Hugo Money-Coutts, 8th Baron Latymer =

English banker and sailor

- Born: Hugo Nevill Money-Coutts; 1 May 1926
- Died: 10 November 2003 (aged 77)
- Title: Baron Latymer
- Predecessor: Thomas Burdett Money-Coutts, 7th Baron Latymer
- Successor: Crispin Money-Coutts, 9th Baron Latymer
- Parents: Thomas Burdett Money-Coutts, 7th Baron Latymer (father); Patience Margaret Money-Coutts (mother)

Hugo Nevill Money-Coutts, 8th Baron Latymer (1 March 1926 – 10 November 2003) was an English banker and sailor. He inherited the title Baron Latymer from his father, Thomas Burdett Money-Coutts, 7th Baron Latymer.

== Sailing ==
Both Latymer and his son, Crispin, have sailed across the Atlantic.

Peerage of England
Preceded by Thomas Money-Coutts	Baron Latymer; 1987–2003	Succeeded by Crispin Money-Coutts
