= Drummond Money-Coutts =

English magician

The Honourable Drummond Money-Coutts
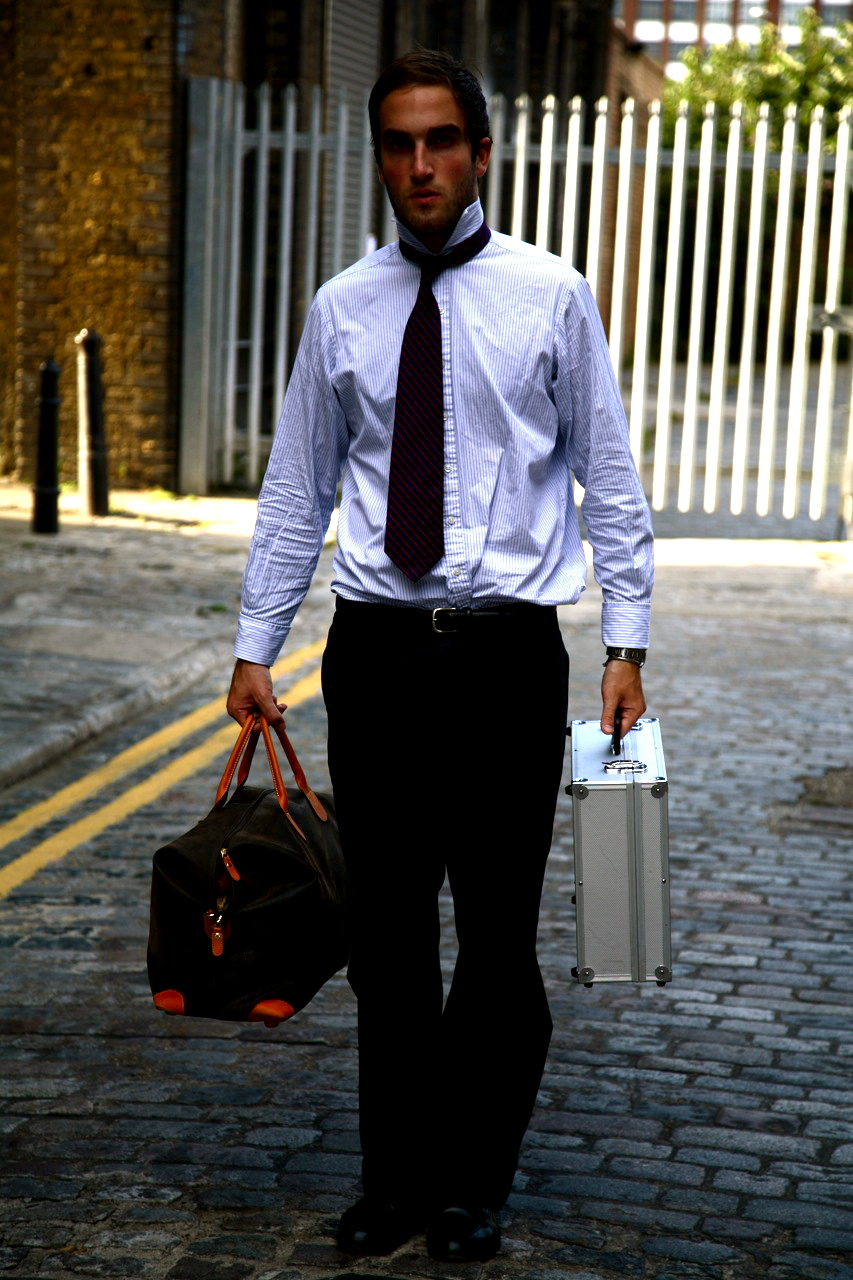
- Money-Coutts in 2008
- Born: Drummond Money-Coutts; 1985 (age 40–41); Westminster, London, England
- Education: Eton College
- Alma mater: University of Leeds
- Occupation: Magician
- Parent(s): The 9th Baron Latymer; Lucy Deedes
- Website: www.dmcmagic.com

Drummond Money-Coutts (born 1986), also known as DMC, is an English magician, and the heir apparent to the Latymer Barony. His first professional performance came in 2000 while he was still at school, at the Royal Horticultural Society.

== Early life and ancestry ==
Money-Coutts was born in the City of Westminster, in London. Money-Coutts' family are the founders of Coutts, a private bank which provides services to some of the wealthiest families in Britain, including the Royal Family. His father is Crispin Money-Coutts, the 9th Baron Latymer. Money-Coutts went to Eton College, and then attended University of Leeds, where he studied modern languages.

== Film productions ==
In August 2007, Money-Coutts travelled to Kenya with Tom Lyon to film Kenyan Conjurations: the School Built By Magic, a DVD documentary released in early 2008. It was produced to raise funds to build a primary school on the Kenyan coast.

In June 2013, his first mainstream television special was aired worldwide on the National Geographic Channel. Card Shark follows the story of the Three-Card Monte in which he travels from London to Paris and Bangkok to both perform and to meet with international card masters. Later that year, he began his second mainstream television series with the channel named Beyond Magic with DMC in which he traveled to places like London, Barcelona, Mexico City and Singapore to perform illusions on the streets along with card tricks.

== Death by Magic ==
In November 2018, Netflix released a series created by DMC titled Death by Magic. In the 8-episode series, Money-Coutts visits "Magic Acts" that have in the past been known for causing the death of the performer. The series was released on Netflix on 30 November 2018.

== Public stunts ==
On 11 July 2011, he announced a public treasure quest to take place in London's Natural History Museum. Towards the end of the week, an eleventh envelope would then be concealed somewhere in the museum by an anonymous assistant - inside which was £1,000 in cash. As he states in an online video - the contents and money would belong to whomever located each envelope.

Once hidden in the museum, the £1,000 envelope was not found for 72 hours but was finally located by Chris Howard and Javier Trapero on the first floor of the Central Hall, on Monday 18 July.

In November 2011, he spent eight consecutive evenings sleeping rough in London as part of a wider campaign for the youth homeless charity, Centrepoint.
