= George Verney, 12th Baron Willoughby de Broke =

English Baron (1659–1728)

George Verney, 12th Baron Willoughby de Broke and de jure 20th Baron Latimer (13 October 1659 – 26 December 1728) was an English peer and clergyman. He was Canon of St George's Chapel, Windsor 1701–13 and Dean of Windsor from 1713–28.

== Biography ==
Willoughby was the second son of Richard Verney, 11th Baron Willoughby de Broke (1621–1711), and Mary Pretyman, daughter of Sir John Pretyman. He was born at the Verney family seat at Compton Verney House in Warwickshire. He inherited the title Baron Willoughby de Broke and Baron Latimer on the death of his father in 1711, his elder brother, John, having died in 1707.

He was educated at Winchester College and became a fellow of New College, Oxford, graduating M.A. in 1686 and D.D. in 1699. After serving as a canon of St George's Chapel, Windsor from 1701 to 1713, he was installed Dean of St Georges Chapel, Windsor, a position he held until his death. He also became register of the Order of the Garter in 1713.

He undertook extensive remodelling of Compton Verney House to give it a more classical appearance, and re-landscaped the garden. He employed master mason John Townesend and son William, who had worked at Blenheim Palace and Christ Church, Oxford.

== Marriage and issue ==
Willoughby married Margaret Heath, daughter of Sir John Heath, on 2 December 1683. They had six children, three of whom reached aged 21:

- George (13 October 1689 – 16 March 1698), died young
- Philip (1690 – 9 June 1697), died young
- Thomas Verney (1691 – 5 May 1710), died of smallpox at age 19; married Hon. Eleanor, daughter of Thomas Leigh, 2nd Baron Leigh. His daughter and heiress, Eleanor (1710 – 14 December 1724), married George Bowes (1701–1760) at age 14 but died two months later; her death was the subject of a poem by Lady Mary Wortley Montagu, "On the Death of Mrs Bowes"
- Richard Verney, 13th Baron Willoughby de Broke (1693–1752), married twice but died without an heir
- Hon. Margaret Verney (18 March 1696 – 9 October 1755) married Anthony Duncombe, 1st Baron Feversham
- Hon. Sir John Verney (1699–1741), married Lady Abigail Harley, daughter of Edward Harley and sister of Edward Harley, 3rd Earl of Oxford and Earl Mortimer and father of 14th Baron Willoughby de Broke

He died 26 December 1728 and was buried at Compton Verney. The title passed to his eldest living son, Richard.

Peerage of England
Preceded by Richard Verney	Baron Willoughby de Broke; 1711–1728	Succeeded by Richard Verney
