= Ian Coutts =

Ian Coutts may refer to:

- Ian Coutts (sportsman) (1928–1997), Scottish cricketer and rugby union player
- Ian Coutts (writer), Canadian non-fiction author
- Ian Coutts (bishop) (born 1956), Anglican bishop
