= Richard Verney, 11th Baron Willoughby de Broke =

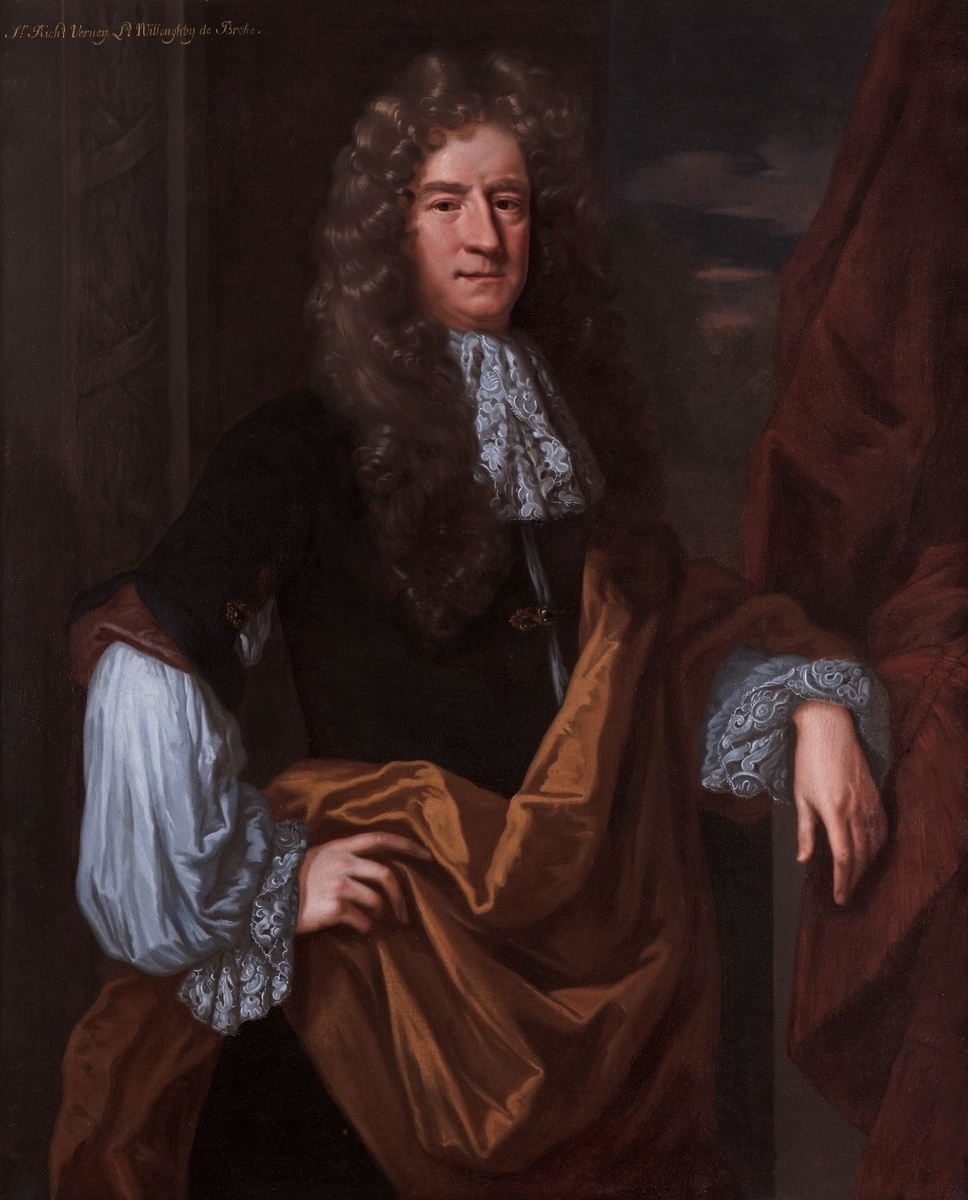

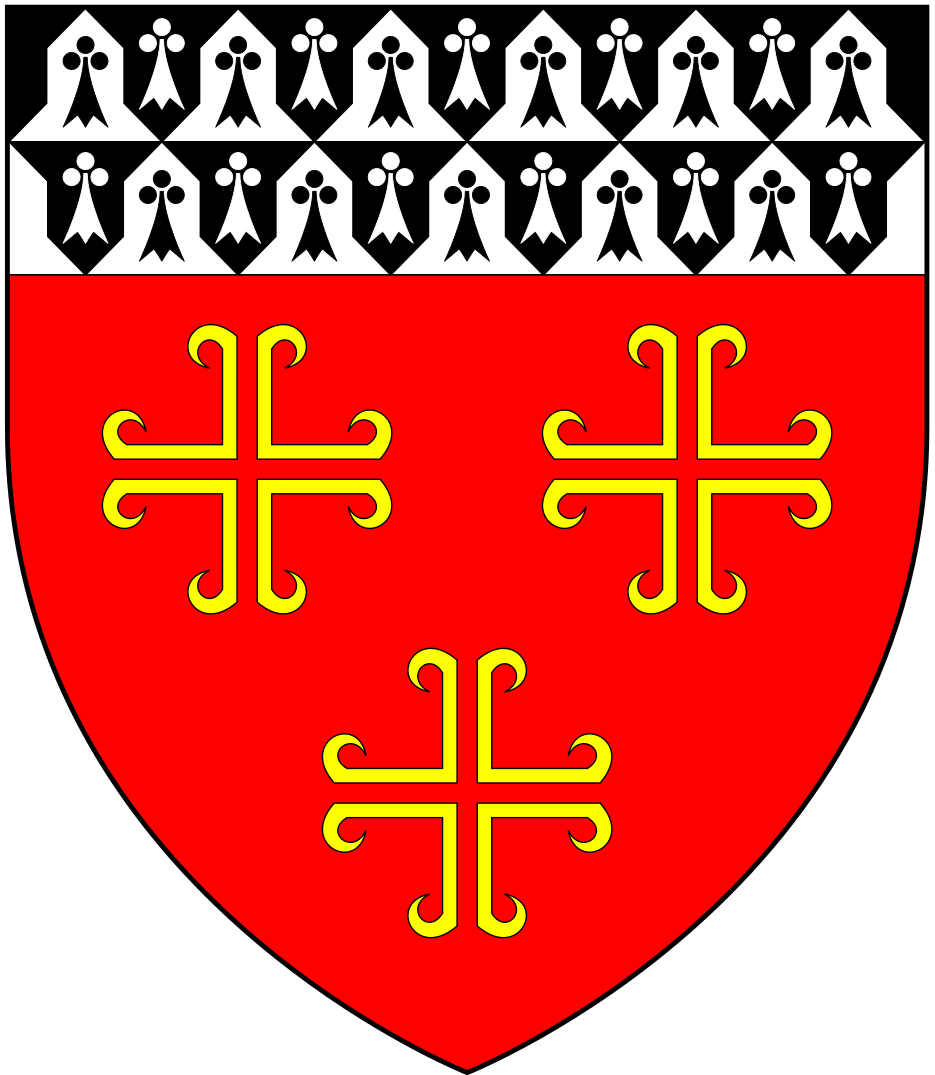
Arms of Verney: Gules, three crosses recerclée voided throughout or a chief vair ermine and ermines

Richard Verney, 11th Baron Willoughby de Broke and de jure 19th Baron Latimer (28 January 1622 – 18 July 1711) was a peer in the peerage of England, High Sheriff and Member of Parliament.

He was born in 1622, the second son of Sir Greville Verney, 7th Baron Willoughby de Broke (1586–1642) and Catherine Southwell of Compton Verney, Warwickshire. He became head of the Verney family in August 1683 following the early death of his fifteen-year-old great-nephew William Verney, 10th Baron Willoughby de Broke, only male descendant of his elder brother Greville, and moved from his Rutland estate to live at Compton Verney.

Richard Verney was High Sheriff of Rutland in 1682 and High Sheriff of Warwickshire in 1683. He was elected to Parliament in 1685 as knight of the shire for Warwickshire and knighted on 1 April 1685, when he presented an address of congratulation from his constituents to King James II on his accession to the throne. He was reelected in 1689.

In 1694 he formally laid claim to the dormant barony and, following a favourable ruling in the House of Lords, he assumed the title of 11th Baron Willoughby de Broke and 19th Baron Latimer in 1695. He married twice, firstly to Mary Pretyman, daughter of Sir John Pretyman of Leicestershire, and secondly to Frances Dove, daughter of Thomas Dove of Upton, Northamptonshire. By his first wife he had four children (Mary, John, George and Thomas), and by his second wife a daughter (Diana).

On his death on 18 July 1711 he was buried in the chapel at Compton Verney and the title passed to his second son George (his eldest son John, MP for Leicestershire, having died childless in 1707).

Parliament of England
Preceded by Thomas Mariet; Sir Richard Newdigate, Bt	Member of Parliament for Warwickshire; 1685–1690; With: Sir Charles Holte, Bt 1685–1689; Sir Richard Newdigate, Bt 1689–90	Succeeded by William Bromley; Andrew Archer
Peerage of England
Preceded by William Verney	Baron Willoughby de Broke; 1695–1711	Succeeded by George Verney
