= Crispin Money-Coutts, 9th Baron Latymer =

British peer (born 1955)

Crispin James Alan Nevill Money-Coutts, 9th Baron Latymer (born 8 March 1955), is a British peer who is a descendant of both the well-known Irish nationalist Thomas Addis Emmet and the banker Thomas Coutts. In 2003, he inherited the title Baron Latymer from his father, the 8th Baron Latymer (1926–2003). He was educated at Eton and Keble College, Oxford.

He rowed in the World Rowing Junior Championships in 1972 (in the eight) and in 1973 (in the eight and the coxless pair, winning a silver medal in the latter), then represented Oxford in the University Boat Race team in 1975 and 1977, winning the latter.

In 2005, Lord Latymer sailed single-handedly across the Atlantic Ocean, on the identical journey his father had taken some decades previously. Following the voyage, which raised £40,000 for Save the Children, Latymer wrote about the voyage in a book, Where the Ocean Meets the Sky (Adlard Coles Nautical, 2009), the name taken from the Rod Stewart song, Rhythm of My Heart.

Lord Latymer is a retired international private banker. He married Lucy Rose Deedes, the daughter of Bill Deedes, whom he has since divorced. They have three children: the newspaper columnist Sophia Money-Coutts, magician Drummond Money-Coutts, and another daughter, Rosie.

Peerage of England
Preceded by Hugo Money-Coutts	Baron Latymer; 2003–present	Incumbent
