= Clovis Vernay =

French-Swiss chess grandmaster (born 1989)

Personal information
- Born: July 15, 1989 (age 36) Saint-Chamond, Loire, France

Chess career
- Country: France (until 2022); Switzerland (since 2022)
- Title: Grandmaster (2022)
- FIDE rating: 2460 (July 2026)
- Peak rating: 2526 (November 2021)

Clovis Vernay is a French-Swiss chess grandmaster.

== Chess career ==
He joined the Lyon Chess Club in 2002. He earned his first GM norm in 2010, second GM norm in 2016, and earned the title in 2021. He switched his FIDE federation from France to Switzerland in 2022.

In July 2007, he won the Grenoble Masters tournament with a score of 6.5/9, defeating top seed and grandmaster Evgeni Janev.

In August 2022, he won the Martigny Open with a score of 6.5/7, finishing ahead of runners-up Fabrizio Patuzzo, Murtez Ondozi, Nicolas Brunner, and Sebastien Joie.
