= Thomas Verny =

French lawyer

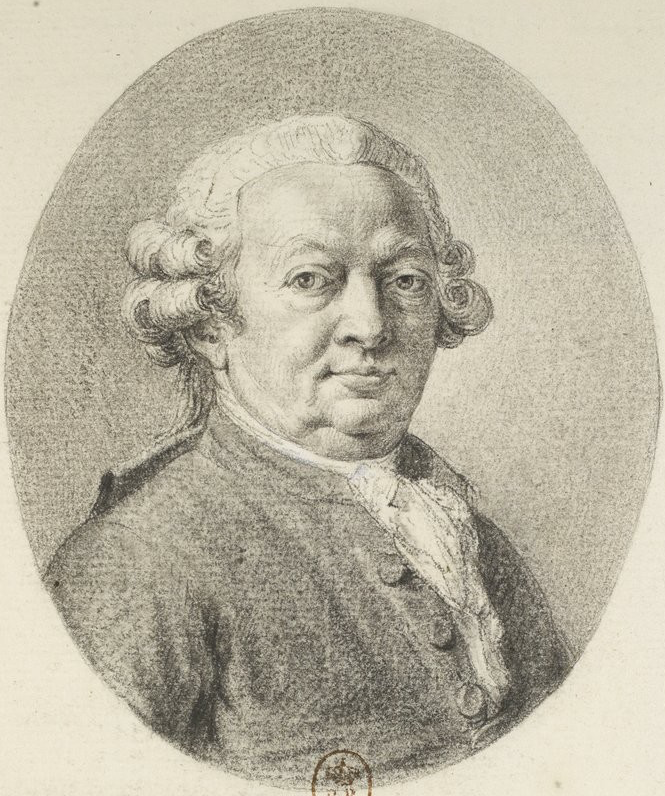

Thomas Verny (born 1726; died 16 July 1808 in Clermont-l'Hérault) was a French lawyer, who had a political career at the start of the Revolution.

Lawyer in the Parlement of Toulouse, Thomas Verny was elected député of the third estate of the bailiwick of Montpellier in the Estates-General of 1789; he was among those who took the Tennis Court Oath.

Thomas Verny was also a member of the Jeux floraux of Toulouse.
