= Hugh Burdett Money-Coutts, 6th Baron Latymer =

English peer and author (1876–1949)

Hugh Money-Coutts, 8th Baron Latymer
- Born: Hugh Money-Coutts; 13 August 1876
- Died: 23 November 1949 (aged 73)
- Title: Baron Latymer
- Predecessor: Francis Money-Coutts, 5th Baron Latymer
- Successor: Thomas Burdett Money-Coutts, 7th Baron Latymer
- Parents: Francis Money-Coutts, 5th Baron Latymer (father); Edith Ellen née Churchill (mother)

Hugh Burdett Money-Coutts, 6th Baron Latymer (13 August 1876 – 23 November 1949) was an English peer. He inherited the title Baron Latymer from his father, Francis Money-Coutts, 5th Baron Latymer.

Money-Coutts was educated at Radley College and New College, Oxford. After university he joined the Royal Navy Volunteer Reserve, where he was promoted to a lieutenant on 7 March 1904. He came within 50 votes of winning the seat of Petersfield for the Liberals in the 1906 United Kingdom general election. In 1908 he moved to Stoodleigh in Devon. In 1910 he left the Liberals to join the Conservatives. His Times obituary states that from this time he was an "effective controversialist" on the subject of Tariff Reform. During the World War I he served as an officer in the Royal North Devon Yeomanry.

He wrote 'The Broads' in 1919; 'Chances and Changes' in 1931; and 'Stalking in Scotland and New Zealand' in 1935.

== Family ==
Money-Coutts married in 1900 Hester Frances Russell, the 4th daughter of Major-General John Cecil Russell, CVO, they had three sons and one daughter:

- Thomas Burdett Money-Coutts, 7th Baron Latymer (1901–1987)
- Lt.-Colonel Hon. Alexander Burdett Money-Coutts (1902–1994)
- Major Hon. Godfrey Burdett Money-Coutts (1905–1979)
- Hon. Mercy Burdett Money-Coutts (1910–1993), who married in 1947 Michael Seiradhakis, and moved to Greece.

Peerage of England
Preceded by Francis Money-Coutts	Baron Latymer; 1923–1949	Succeeded by Thomas Burdett Money-Coutts
