= Henry Peyto-Verney, 16th Baron Willoughby de Broke =

English Baron

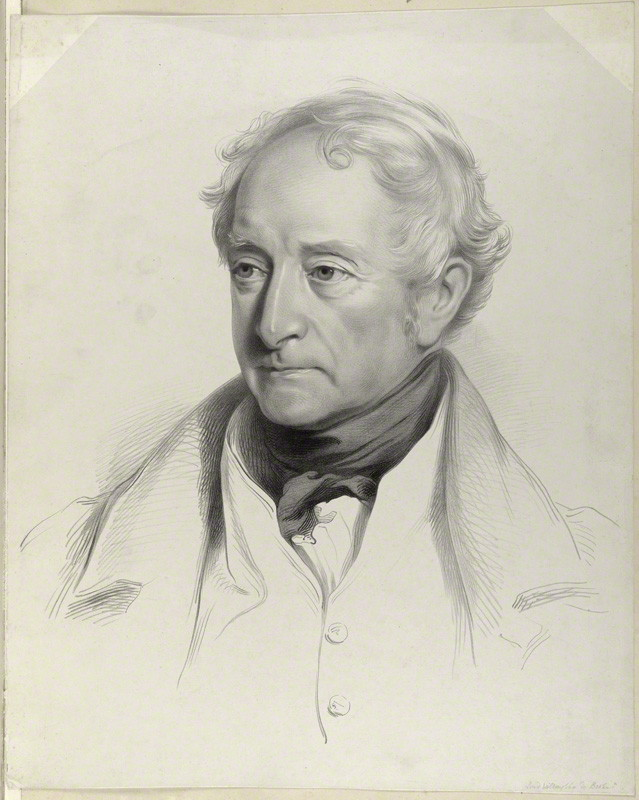

Henry Peyto-Verney, 16th Baron Willoughby de Broke and de jure 24th Baron Latimer (5 April 1773 – 16 December 1852) was a peer in the peerage of England.

Henry Peyto-Verney was born on 5 April 1773, the younger son of John Peyto-Verney (1738–1816),14th Baron Willoughby de Broke and Lady Louisa North, daughter of Francis North, 1st Earl of Guilford. He lived a somewhat reclusive life at the Verney family seat at Compton Verney House in Warwickshire, inheriting the title 16th Baron Willoughby de Broke and 24th Baron Latimer on the death of his elder brother John Peyto-Verney (1762–1820).

He married Margaret Williams, daughter of Sir John Williams, 1st Baronet Williams of Bodelwyddan in St Asaph Cathedral on 10 March 1829. Lady Margaret commissioned the building of the remarkable Marble Church, Bodelwyddan in North Wales to his memory soon after his death at Compton Verney on 16 December 1852. Margaret herself died in 1880. He was succeeded as 17th Baron by his nephew Robert John Barnard (1809–1862) who changed his name to Verney.

== Notes ==
Peerage of England
Preceded by John Peyto-Verney	Baron Willoughby de Broke; 1820–1852	Succeeded by Robert John Verney
