= William Verney, 10th Baron Willoughby de Broke =

William Verney, 10th Baron Willoughby de Broke and de jure 18th Baron Latimer (12 June 1668 – 23 August 1683), was a peer in the peerage of England.

William Verney was the only son of Sir Greville Verney, 9th Baron Willoughby de Broke (1649–1668), and Lady Diana Russell, daughter of William Russell, 1st Duke of Bedford. He inherited the title 10th Baron Willoughby de Broke and 18th Baron Latimer on the death of his father in 1668. On his premature death at the age of 15, his title went into temporary abeyance until claimed by his great-uncle Richard Verney in 1695.

== Notes ==
Peerage of England
Preceded by Greville Verney	Baron Willoughby de Broke; 1668–1683	Succeeded by Richard Verney
