= Greville Verney, 9th Baron Willoughby de Broke =

Greville Verney, 9th Baron Willoughby de Broke and de jure 17th Baron Latimer (1649 – 23 July 1668) was a peer in the peerage of England

Greville Verney was born in 1649, the only son of Greville Verney, 8th Baron Willoughby de Broke (c. 1620 – 1648), and Elizabeth Wenman. He inherited the title 9th Baron Willoughby de Broke and 17th Baron Latimer on the death of his father in 1648. He married on 29 August 1667 Lady Diana Russell, the daughter of William Russell, 1st Duke of Bedford. On his death on 23 July 1668, the title passed to his only son, William Verney.

Peerage of England
Preceded by George Verney	Baron Willoughby de Broke; 1649–1668	Succeeded by William Verney
