= Greville Verney, 8th Baron Willoughby de Broke =

Greville Verney, 8th Baron Willoughby de Broke and de jure 16th Baron Latimer (c. 1620 – 9 December 1648) was a peer in the peerage of England.

Greville Verney was born circa 1620, the elder son of Greville Verney, 7th Baron Willoughby de Broke (1586–1642), and Katherine Southwell. He inherited the title 8th Baron Willoughby de Broke and 16th Baron Latimer on the death of his father in 1642. He married Elizabeth Wenman. Upon his death, on 9 December 1648, the title passed to his only son, Greville Verney.

He served as High Sheriff of Warwickshire in 1647.

Peerage of England
Preceded by Greville Verney	Baron Willoughby de Broke; 1642–1648	Succeeded by Greville Verney
