= John Peyto-Verney, 15th Baron Willoughby de Broke =

John Peyto-Verney, 15th Baron Willoughby de Broke and de jure 23rd Baron Latimer (28 June 1762 – 1 September 1820) was a peer in the peerage of England.

John Peyto-Verney was born on 28 June 1762, the eldest son of John Peyto-Verney, 14th Baron Willoughby de Broke (1738–1816), and Lady Louisa North, daughter of Francis North, 1st Earl of Guilford at the Verney family seat at Compton Verney House in Warwickshire, inheriting the title 15th Baron Willoughby de Broke and 23rd Baron Latimer on the death of his father in 1816. Upon his death, on 1 September 1820, the title passed to his younger brother Henry.

Peerage of England
| Preceded by John Peyto-Verney | Baron Willoughby de Broke; 1816–1820 | Succeeded by Henry Peyto-Verney |
