= Richard Verney, 13th Baron Willoughby de Broke =

Richard Verney, 13th Baron Willoughby de Broke and de jure 21st Baron Latimer (1693 – 11 August 1752) was an English peer.

Richard Verney was born in 1693, the fourth but second surviving son of George Verney, 12th Baron Willoughby de Broke (1659–1728), and Margaret Heath, daughter of Sir Thomas Heath at the Verney family seat at Compton Verney House in Warwickshire.

He matriculated at New College, Oxford.

He inherited the title Baron Willoughby de Broke and Baron Latimer on the death of his father in 1728, his elder brother Thomas having died of smallpox in 1710. Two other elder brothers died young.

He married Penelope, daughter of Clifton Packe of Prestwold Hall, Leicestershire (died 1730). He married secondly Elizabeth Williams, daughter of Nathaniel Williams.

His only son died in infancy. Upon his death, on 11 August 1752, the title passed to his nephew John Peyto-Verney, who was the son of his younger brother Sir John Verney.

Peerage of England
Preceded by George Verney	Baron Willoughby de Broke; 1728–1752	Succeeded by John Peyto-Verney
