= John Peyto-Verney, 14th Baron Willoughby de Broke =

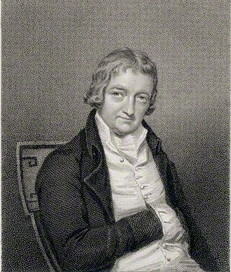
John Peyto-Verney, 14th Baron Willoughby de Broke

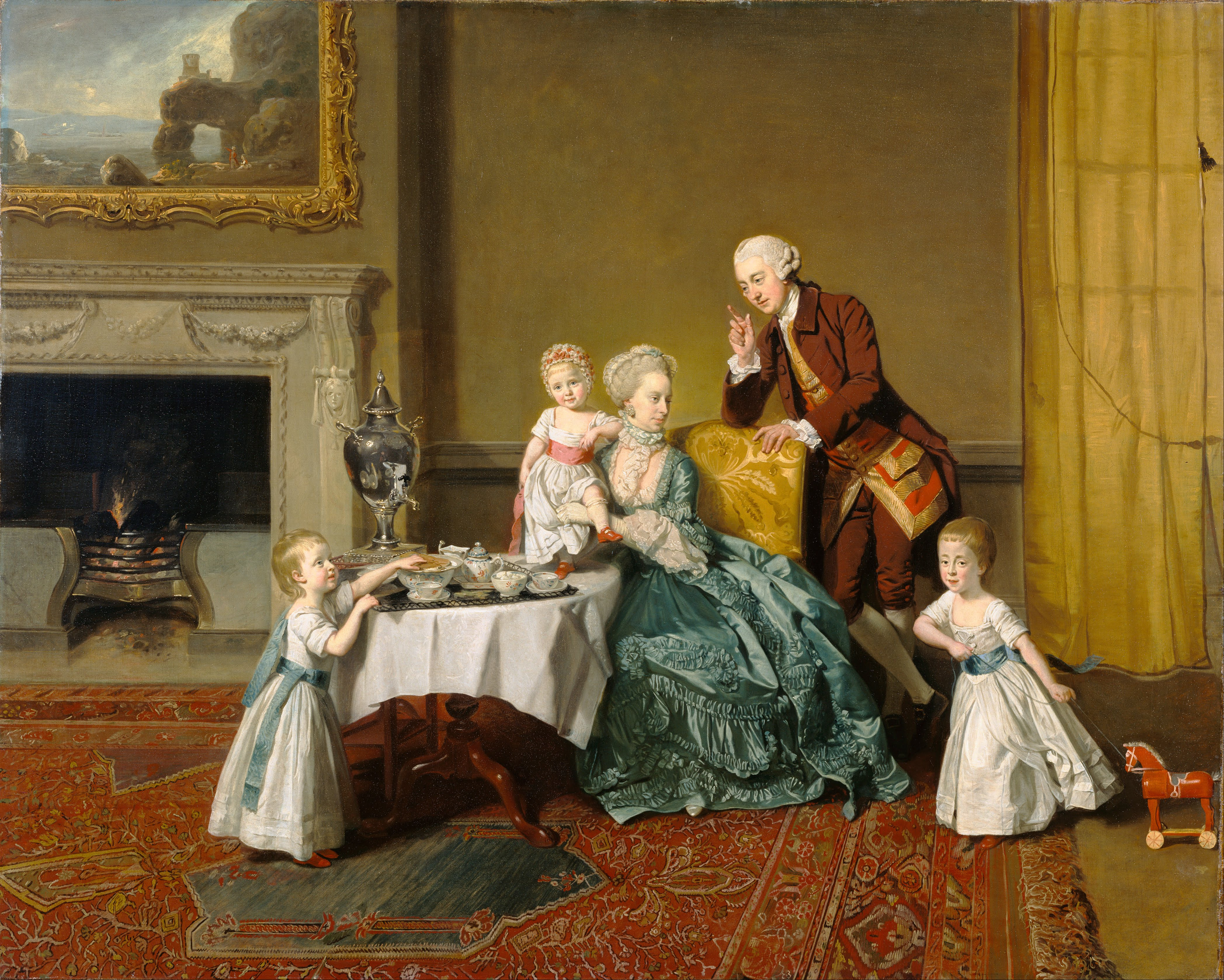
John Peyto-Verney, 14th Baron Willoughby de Broke and his Family in the Breakfast Room at Compton Verney. Painting c.1766 by Johan Zoffany, Getty Center, Los Angeles

John Peyto-Verney, 14th Baron Willoughby de Broke and de jure 22nd Baron Latimer (5 August 1738 – 15 February 1816) was a peer in the peerage of England.

John Peyto-Verney was born John Verney on 5 August 1738, the son of Sir John Verney, KC (1699–1741) and Abigail Harley, inheriting the title 14th Baron Willoughby de Broke and 22nd Baron Latimer on the death of his uncle Richard Verney, 13th Baron Willoughby de Broke in 1752. He married on 8 October 1761 Lady Louisa North, the daughter of Francis North, 1st Earl of Guilford and sister of Prime Minister Lord North. They had nine children including John, Louisa and Henry.

He undertook a major rebuilding of the family seat, Compton Verney House near Kineton, Warwickshire, between 1762 and 1768 to the designs of architect Robert Adam and then had the gardens landscaped by Capability Brown in 1769. He was made a Lord of his Majesty's Bedchamber in 1763. In 1772 he inherited valuable estates at neighbouring Chesterton from his cousin Margaret Peyto, last of the Peyto line, on condition he added the surname Peyto to his. Chesterton House, the previous home of the Peyto family, was subsequently demolished (1802).

On his death on 15 February 1816, his title passed to his eldest son John.

Peerage of England
Preceded by Richard Verney	Baron Willoughby de Broke; 1752–1816	Succeeded by John Peyto-Verney
