= Compton Verney =

Parish and manor in the county of Warwickshire, England

Coordinates: 52.17348°N 1.54519°W

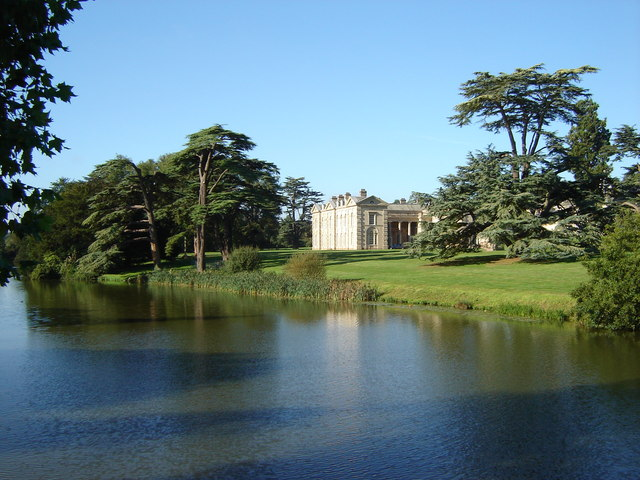
Compton Verney House, the manor house rebuilt 1762–68 by John Peyto-Verney, 14th Baron Willoughby de Broke

Compton Verney is a parish and historic manor in the county of Warwickshire, England. The population taken at the 2011 census was 119. The surviving manor house is the Georgian mansion Compton Verney House.

== Descent of the manor ==
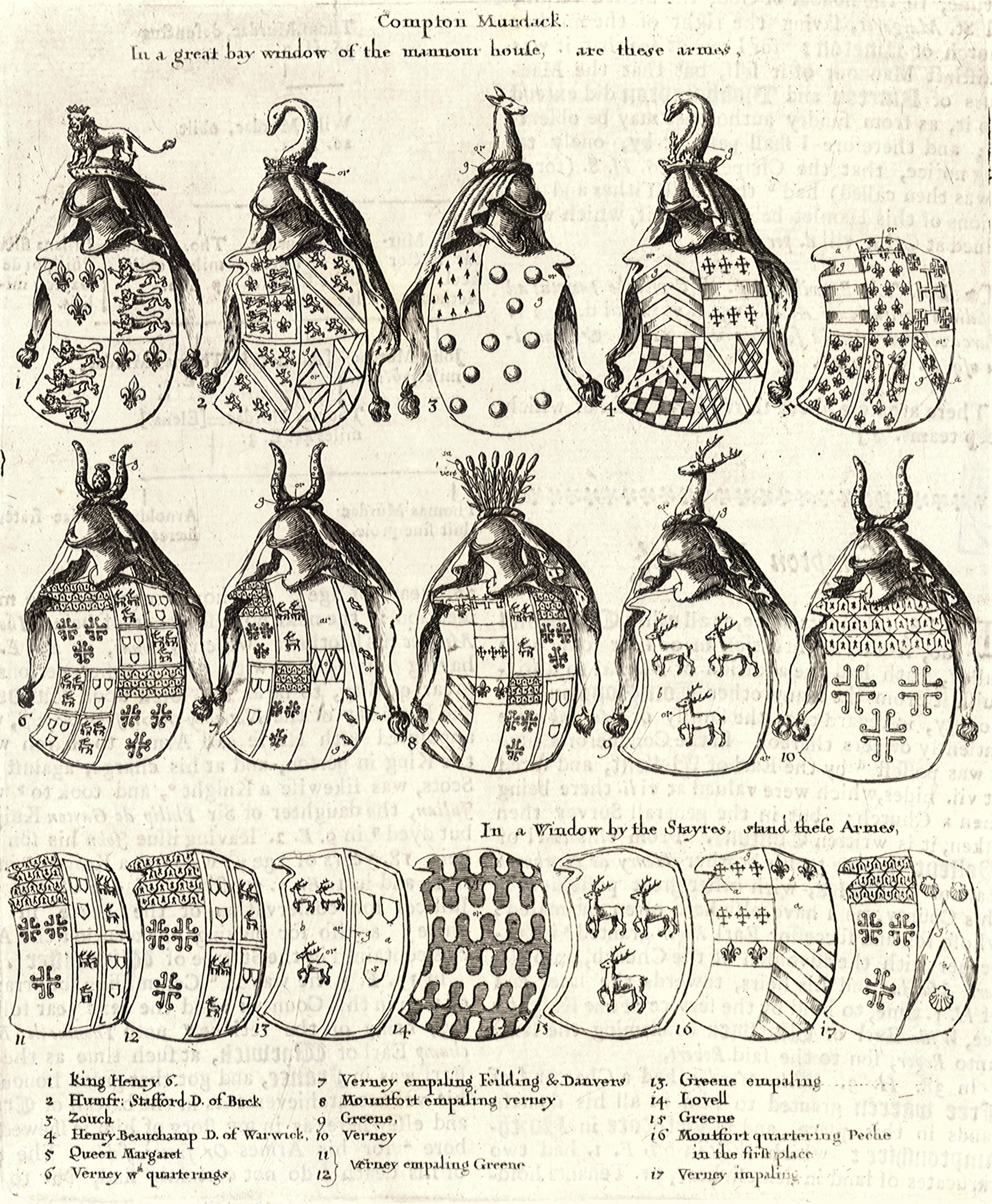
1656 drawing of heraldic glass set up by Sir Richard Verney (d.1489) in a "great bay window" of the great hall of old Compton Verney House

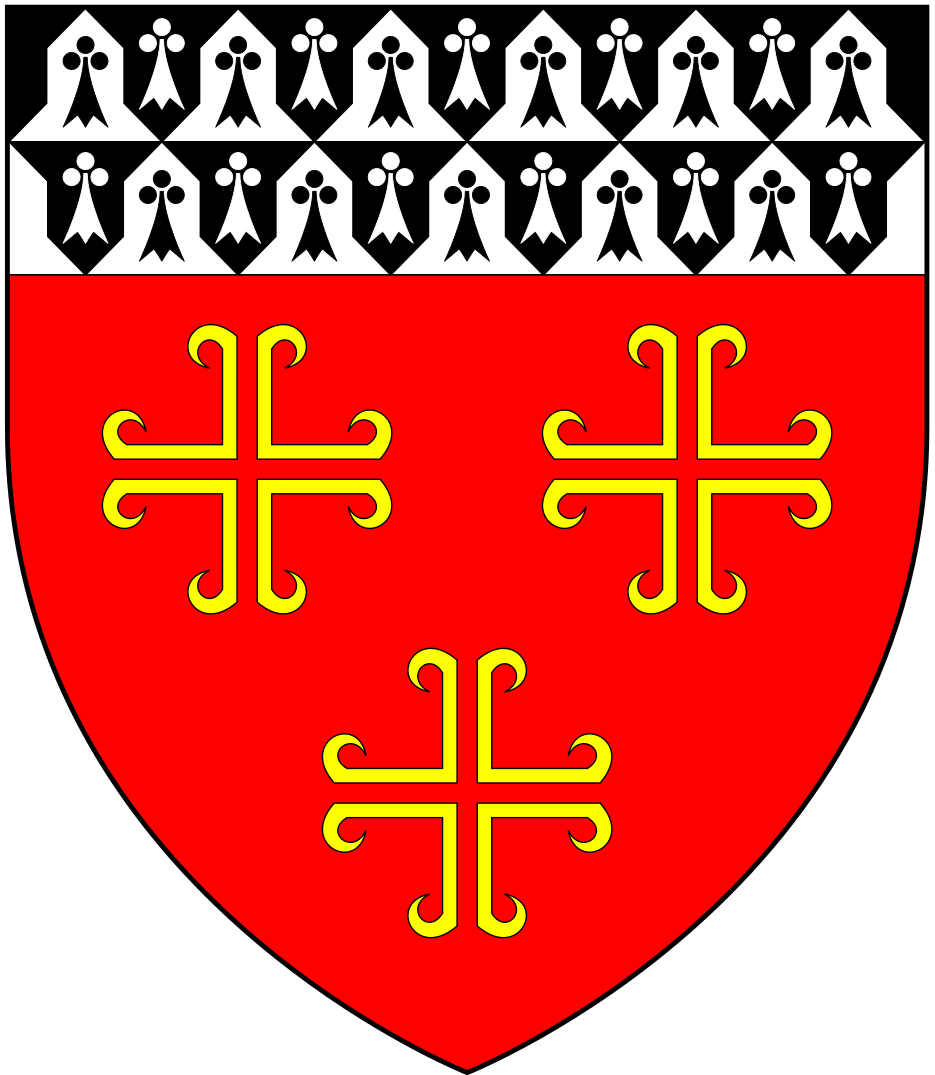
Arms of Verney of Compton Verney: Gules, three crosses recerclée voided throughout or a chief vair ermine and ermines

The first record of a settlement at Compton Verney was the late Saxon manor of Compton, meaning "settlement in a valley" (combe-town). It had good communications, being served by the Fosse Way, which runs north–south half a mile from the site and led originally from the Roman settlements of Cirencester to Leicester. The Domesday Book of 1086 lists Compton as two manors, the largest of which was among the many holdings of Robert de Beaumont (c. 1049 – 1118), Count of Meulan, one of the few proven companions of William the Conqueror who fought at the Battle of Hastings in 1066.

It descended to his younger brother Henry de Beaumont (d.1119) ("Henry de Newburgh") who granted the church as a prebend to support one canon of the Collegiate Church of St Mary. The donation was confirmed by Walter Durdent Bishop of Coventry from 1149 to 1159 and again twice by Guy de Beauchamp (c. 1272 – 1315), in 1291 and 1310. The village was demolished before the time of the historian John Rous (c. 1411/20 – 1492) (a canon of the Collegiate Church of St Mary), as William Dugdale notes in his Antiquities of Warwickshire (1656):

When this town was depopulated I cannot directly affirm but it seems to have been antiently for I find that our countreyman Rous hath it in the list of those whereof he so much complains.

=== Murdac ===
At some time before 1150 the manor was granted to Robert Murdac when it became known as Compton Murdak, and was inherited by his descendants and thence to the heirs of the Murdak family. In 1370, after two hundred years of ownership by his family, Sir Thomas Murdak surrendered the estate to Alice Perrers, mistress of King Edward III.

=== Verney ===
In about 1441 it was acquired by Richard Verney (d.1489) with the assistance of his younger brother John Verney, Dean of Lichfield, formerly Rector of Bredon in Worcestershire, and supervisor and receiver-general to Richard Beauchamp (1382–1439). The Verney family had begun acquiring lands in the area surrounding Compton Murdak in the 1430s before purchasing the estate. In about 1500 the manor became known as Compton Verney. According to William Dugdale in his Antiquities of Warwickshire (1656) a new manor house was built in about 1442:

"Richard Verney Esquire (afterward knight) possest it and built a great part of the house as it now standeth, wherein besides his own armes with matches, he then set up towards the upper end of the hall the armes of King Henry the Sixth, Queen Margaret, Humfrey Earl of Stafford, Henry Beauchamp, and the Baron Zouche, with some others, by which it appeareth that he was one of those that adhered to the House of Lancaster".

The Manor House was extended by succeeding generations as the family's fortune expanded. In 1695 Richard Verney (1621–1711) established his claim to the Baron Willoughby de Broke before the House of Lords, following the early death of his fifteen-year-old great-nephew William Verney, only male descendant of his elder brother Greville Verney, and moved from his Rutland estate to live at Compton Verney. His son George Verney (1659–1728) rebuilt the house and landscaped the gardens in the early 18th century. John Peyto-Verney (1738–1816) completely remodelled the house to the design of Robert Adam and the grounds to the design of Capability Brown.

=== Watson ===
Adverse financial circumstances forced the Verney family to let the house from 1887 to various tenants. Finally, it was sold in 1921 to the Leeds soap magnate Joseph Watson (d.1922) of Linton Spring near Wetherby in Yorkshire, who in 1922 was raised to the peerage as "Baron Manton of Compton Verney". He never lived in the house as he died in 1922 of a heart attack whilst hunting nearby with the Warwickshire Foxhounds. His title was taken from his horse-racing training establishment at Manton near Marlborough in Wiltshire. He was buried nearby in the churchyard of his estate at Offchurch, Warwickshire. His eldest son and heir Miles Watson (1899–1968) resided at Compton Verney for a short while, but soon sold it and moved to Plumpton Place in Sussex.

=== Other ===
It then belonged to various owners before being requisitioned by the War Office during the Second World War. After the War, the house was never lived in again. It now belongs to the Compton Verney House Trust who run it as an art gallery.

== See also ==
- Compton Verney Art Gallery
- Compton Verney House

== Sources ==
- Dugdale, Sir William, Antiquities of Warwickshire, London, 1656, pp. 433–9, Compton MurdakThe antiquities of Warwickshire illustrated : from records, leiger-books, manuscripts, charters, evidences, tombes, and armes : beautified with maps, prospects, and portraictures
- Victoria County History, History of the County of Warwick, Vol. 5, London, 1949, pp. 58–60, Kington Hundred, Parishes: Compton Verney Parishes: Compton Verney | British History Online
- Arthur Collins & Sir Egerton Brydges, Peerage of England, Vol.6, 1812, pp. 691–703 Peerage of England. ...
- William Holden Hutton, Highways and Byways in Shakespeare's Country, London, 1914, pp. 50–56 Highways and Byways in Shakespeare's Country
