= Rupert Watson, 3rd Baron Manton =

British racehorse owner (1924–2003)

Arms of Rupert Watson, 3rd Baron Manton: Argent, on a chevron azure between four martlets three in-chief and one in-base sable a crescent between two roses of the field (Watson) quartering Sable, a chevron between three estoiles argent (Langdale)

Joseph Rupert Eric Robert Watson, 3rd Baron Manton, DL (22 January 1924 – 8 August 2003), of Houghton Hall in the parish of Sancton, Yorkshire, was a British soldier, landowner and racehorse owner who served as Senior Steward of the Jockey Club (1982–1985).

== Origins ==
He was the only son and heir of Miles Watson, 2nd Baron Manton of Compton Verney, Warwickshire, and later of Plumpton Place, East Sussex, by his first wife, Alethea Langdale, the younger of the two daughters and co-heiresses of Colonel Philip Joseph Langdale, of Houghton Hall. In 1936, when Watson was 12 years of age, his parents were divorced and his father remarried two years later.

== Inheritance ==
He inherited the barony of Manton on the death of his father in 1968. He was given Houghton Hall, the ancient seat of the extinct Barony of Langdale, by his maternal aunt Countess FitzWilliam (1898–1995) (née Joyce Elizabeth Mary Langdale), eldest daughter and co-heiress of Lieutenant-Colonel Philip Joseph Langdale, who from 1956 was the wife of Thomas Wentworth-Fitzwilliam, 10th Earl Fitzwilliam (1904–1979).

== Career ==
He lived near Melton Mowbray, Leicestershire, until moving to the East Riding of Yorkshire to run Houghton Hall and its 5,000-acre (20 km^{2}) estate. He was appointed a Deputy Lieutenant of Humberside in 1980.

=== Military career ===
He was educated at Eton College. In 1942 Watson joined the British Army and the next year was commissioned into the Life Guards. He saw service in Egypt, Germany, and Italy. He was promoted captain and retired in 1947. In 1951 he returned to the army and served in the 7th Queen's Own Hussars until 1956. He then served in the Leicestershire Yeomanry, in which he was appointed Adjutant.

=== Horse racing ===
From a young age Watson was a successful jockey, having won 130 times as an amateur. He won the Kim Muir Chase at the Cheltenham Festival in 1955 riding Gay Monarch.

Following the example of his father, who had established a stud at Plumpton Place in Sussex, and of his grandfather the 1st Baron Manton, who took his title from the famous racehorse-training establishment at Manton, Wiltshire, purchased by him shortly before his early death, he became a successful owner and breeder of racehorses. In 1970 he was a director of Thirsk Racecourse, in Yorkshire. From 1970 to 1975 he was a member of the Horserace Betting Levy Board, created to divert monies from bookmakers to the racing industry. From 1982-5 he served as Senior Steward of the Jockey Club, when that role was still effectively the chief executive of the British horse-racing industry, before the creation of the British Horseracing Board in 1993. As Senior Steward he led the campaign to persuade the government to allow betting shops to show televised races.

Manton was a steward at several racecourses, Doncaster, Beverley and York Racecourse. He was a Tattersalls Committee member and between 1985 and 1991 he chaired the York Race Committee. In 1998 he entered a horse he had bred and owned, Silver Stick, in the Horse & Hound Grand Military Gold Cup at Sandown Park. His son Miles was the jockey and won the race. When the Queen Mother presented Manton with his trophy he told her: "I saddled the horse; I bred the horse - and the jockey."

=== Fox-hunting ===
He was Field Master of both the Belvoir and the Quorn Foxhounds and was a "well known" hunter in Leicestershire.

== Marriage and children ==
In 1951 he married Mary Elizabeth Hallinan (born 1925) (known as "Mimi"), elder daughter of Major Thomas Francis Dennehy Hallinan (d.1959) of Ashbourne House, Glounthaune, County Cork, Ireland (of the T. Hallinan & Sons flour milling family which had mills at Glandalane, Fermoy; Avoncore, Midleton, etc) and aunt of John Magnier the Irish billionaire business magnate and leading thoroughbred stud owner, son of her twin sister Evelyn Hallinan (Evie Stockwell). By coincidence Magnier's racing partner, Robert Sangster, was based at the famous training establishment at Manton, Wiltshire, which he purchased in 1985, formerly owned by Rupert's grandfather the 1st Baron Manton, and from which he took his title. By his wife he had two sons and a daughter who were triplets and two older daughters. His daughter Fiona is the mother of the political activist and convicted felon George Cottrell.

== Death and succession ==
On his death on 8 August 2003 the title passed to Miles Watson, 4th Baron Manton, his eldest son. Miles had been a successful amateur jockey and was an officer in the Life Guards.

Peerage of the United Kingdom
Preceded by (George) Miles Watson	Baron Manton; 1968–2003	Succeeded by Miles Ronald Marcus Watson
