= Peg Fyfe =

Folklore figure from Yorkshire, England

Peg Fyfe is a character in English folklore, associated with the East Riding of Yorkshire. She is variably depicted as a bandit, witch, or gang leader.

== Character ==
Peg Fyfe's surname is sometimes recorded as Fife. She is commonly referred to as the "Robber Queen" (or simply "Queen") of Holderness, and occasionally some variation of the "Witch of Weighton." When a location of origin is ascribed to Fyfe, she is described as a local of Market Weighton. A disused chalk pit in nearby Kilham was known to locals as Peg Fyfe Hole, for Fyfe and her gang were said to have used it as a hideaway.

Tradition provides that Peg Fyfe was the leader of a group of bandits that conducted various crimes across East Yorkshire in the 17th or 18th century. She is also portrayed as a witch and a highwayman. Her followers are portrayed as exclusively male, and the activities of Fyfe and her gang centre around horse theft or acts of violence for material gain.

== Folklore ==
=== 'Cruel Peg Fyfe' ===
The most common tale featuring Peg Fyfe involves a small farm that is said to have operated near Spurn Point (or Skeffling) in Holderness. Fyfe and her gang ordered a stable boy to leave the stable door open so they could return later to steal the farm's horses. She threatened to "skin [the boy] alive" if he told the farm's owner of the gang's intentions. The boy complied with Fyfe's order by instead telling the horses themselves about his interaction with the gang, ensuring that the farm's owner was in earshot. The farmer was subsequently able to ambush Fyfe's gang that night with a gun, injuring some; Fyfe and her followers nonetheless escaped.

Years later, once the stable boy thought Fyfe and her men had long forgotten about him, the gang returned one night and carried out their threat to flay him. The youth dragged himself home, but died shortly after being found on the doorstep. This act earned Fyfe her moniker of 'Cruel Peg Fyfe.' In some versions of the story, Fyfe escapes before she can be punished for the boy's murder, while in others, this act ultimately leads to Fyfe's execution.

In 1917, Selby Times columnist William Farley presented a version of the stable boy's story in which his murder occurs on a bridge over the Foulness, close to Holme-on-Spalding-Moor. A 1919 recounting of the tale in the Bridlington Free Press was set in Kilnwick, where Fyfe, "better known as Peg o' the Wolds," was also said to own land.

Although Fyfe is most commonly associated with East Yorkshire, a story originating in the North Yorkshire parish of Wistow holds that she "skinned a man alive" on Boggart Bridge, which connects the settlement to nearby Selby. This story may refer to a different individual to the Spurn Point youth, as tradition provides no further details of the circumstances preceding the crime in Wistow.

=== Execution of Peg Fyfe ===
Legends generally depict Peg Fyfe being eventually caught by authorities and executed by hanging. The location most commonly given for Fyfe's hanging is a hill named Gallow's Hill that allegedly hosted public executions between Market Weighton and either Shiptonthorpe or Shipton.

In most versions of the tale, Fyfe evades death by swallowing a spoon to prevent her neck from breaking. Some variants of this version end with knights or soldiers killing her with swords. In versions of the story that depict Peg Fyfe as a witch, attempts to hang her are frustrated by several ropes preternaturally breaking, until the executioner decides to hang her from a willow tree. In some English traditions, willows are said to repel witches.

An 1890 anthology of local folklore provides that a member of Fyfe's gang was executed at the York Tyburn gallows in Knavesmire, near the city of York. A 1922 investigation into Fyfe's historicity found that some residents of Market Weighton believed Fyfe herself was also executed in York.

== Historicity ==
=== Investigations into Peg Fyfe's historical existence ===
In a 1922 article for The Northern Weekly Gazette, folklorist John Fairfax-Blakeborough related his efforts to investigate whether Peg Fyfe existed. In doing so, he spoke with Arthur Gill, Reverend of Market Weighton's church between 1910 and 1925. Gill recalled that a deceased parishioner once described Peg Fyfe as a resident of Market Weighton and an acquaintance of the parishioner's ancestors; Fyfe was said to have married a man named Rhodes around the time of the Jacobite rising of 1745. Gill subsequently checked the church's records and found a Jane Fife had indeed married a William Rhodes there in June 1757.

Blakeborough found no record of a Jane or Peg with the surname Fife or Fyfe being "arraigned at York, much less executed there." Furthermore, he was unable to find any residents of Market Weighton in possession of "old diaries" documenting that their ancestors knew of a criminal with a similar profile. Blakeborough concluded it was likely that a similarly named resident of Market Weighton was once believed to have "supernatural powers," but she probably existed at "a much earlier date than Jane Fife" did, and much of the Peg Fyfe folklore was fictitious. Indeed, witch trials in England had effectively ceased by the end of the 1600s, and the Witchcraft Act of 1735 ended the legal assumption that witches existed.

In 1993, the Hull Daily Mail interviewed local teacher Larry Malkin about his efforts to trace Fyfe's historicity. Malkin described Fyfe as "one of the most... elusive characters" in East Riding tradition, but stated he believed she had been based on a real criminal.

=== Historicity of the Fife Gang ===
There is some evidence that a criminal outfit known locally as the Fife gang was active in Yorkshire in the 17th or 18th centuries. Writing for The Yorkshire Post in 1866, clergyman Thomas Jackson stated that Yorkshire had once housed "several gangs of highwaymen," some of which were "known by the names of their respective leaders." These groups—which Jackson named as including the Fife, Barnby Moor and Knavesmire gangs—were active "[a]bout a hundred years" before his article. He did not state whether any of the gangs were said to have included, or been led by, a woman.

In an 1873 memoir, Jackson's father, also named Thomas Jackson, recalled growing up in Sancton, a village bordering Market Weighton, and being told by adults about the exploits of the "Fife gang." He recounted their reputation as a "formidable company of marauders" that had been executed at a gallows "halfway between Market Weighton and Shipton." Tradition holds that Peg Fyfe may have been executed at such a location. However, the elder Jackson's memoir similarly contains no mention of this gang having a woman leader or member.

=== Discussion of Fyfe's exploits as real events ===
Folklorist Doris E. Marrant describes the story of Peg Fyfe and the stable boy as characteristic of Yorkshire legends that are archetypal rather than literal. By outsmarting Fyfe, albeit temporarily, Marrant suggests that the boy is a stock character of a "Yorkshire tyke" who is "honest, industrious... and canny at getting out of corners." Historian Ivan Broadhead suggests that crimes attributed to Fyfe may have derived from historical accounts of acts perpetrated by Viking raiders or pirates in the region.

=== Alleged museum donation ===
The Hull Daily Mail reported in 1921 that an anonymous benefactor had donated a swordstick allegedly belonging to "Peg Fife, the witch of the Yorkshire Wolds" to the Hull Municipal Museum. The item's status is uncertain, as the museum and most of its pieces were destroyed when the Luftwaffe bombed the building in 1943 as part of the Hull Blitz.

== Similarities with other regional legends ==
In 1942, a regional newspaper linked Peg Fyfe's tale to a similar story originating from Lincolnshire, which borders the East Riding of Yorkshire. In this legend, a young page employed at Girsby Manor was approached by a group of men who threatened to "skin him alive" if he did not help them rob the property. The page informed his employers. Though most of the robbers were punished, they returned years later and executed their threat. According to tradition, Girsby Manor is haunted by the ghost of the page, which manifests as a ball of fire.

== In popular culture ==
- The novel The Story of Ragged Robyn (1945) by Oliver Onions depicts the story of Peg Fyfe and the horse farm from the perspective of the stable boy. Characters briefly discuss the legend of Fyfe in Onions' earlier publication, The Drakestone (1906).
- The song 'Peg Fyfe' by Hull-based band, Beggar's Bridge, included on their 2015 album Short Stories Tall Tales, is inspired by the legend.
- The legend of Peg Fyfe features in James Barrie's 2017 novel, The First of Nine: The Case of the Clementhorpe Killer.
- As of 2024, the All Hallows Brewery of the Goodmanham Arms pub in Goodmanham produces an ale named after Peg Fyfe, and another named after Ragged Robyn, the moniker given to the stable boy targeted by Fyfe in Oliver Onions' 1945 novel.
