= Houghton, East Riding of Yorkshire =

Hamlet in the East Riding of Yorkshire, England

Coordinates: 53.841714°N 0.653875°W

Houghton
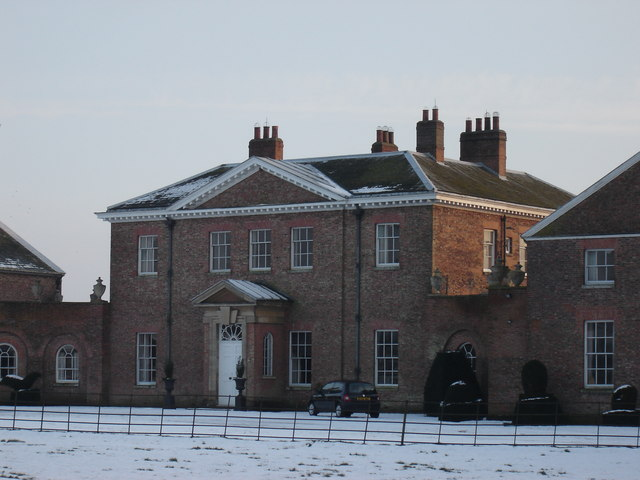
- Houghton Hall

- Location within the East Riding of Yorkshire
- OS grid reference: SE886392
  - London: 160 mi (260 km) S
- Civil parish: Sancton
- Unitary authority: East Riding of Yorkshire
- Ceremonial county: East Riding of Yorkshire
- Region: Yorkshire and the Humber
- Country: England
- Sovereign state: United Kingdom
- Post town: YORK
- Postcode district: YO43
- Dialling code: 01430
- Police: Humberside
- Fire: Humberside
- Ambulance: Yorkshire
- UK Parliament: Goole and Pocklington

Houghton is a hamlet in the East Riding of Yorkshire, England. It is situated approximately 2 miles (3.2 km) south of the market town of Market Weighton.

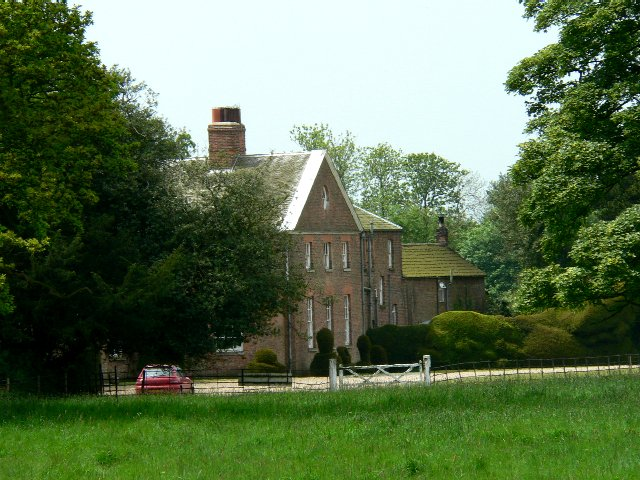
Houghton Hall, near Houghton

It forms part of the civil parish of Sancton.

Houghton Hall was designated a Grade I listed building in 1952 and is now recorded in the National Heritage List for England, maintained by Historic England.

The name Houghton derives from either the Old English Hofatūn meaning 'Hofa's settlement', or hōfetūn meaning 'settlement growing with alehoof'.
