= Compton Verney Art Gallery =

Art gallery in Warwickshire, England

Coordinates: 52.1732°N 1.547°W

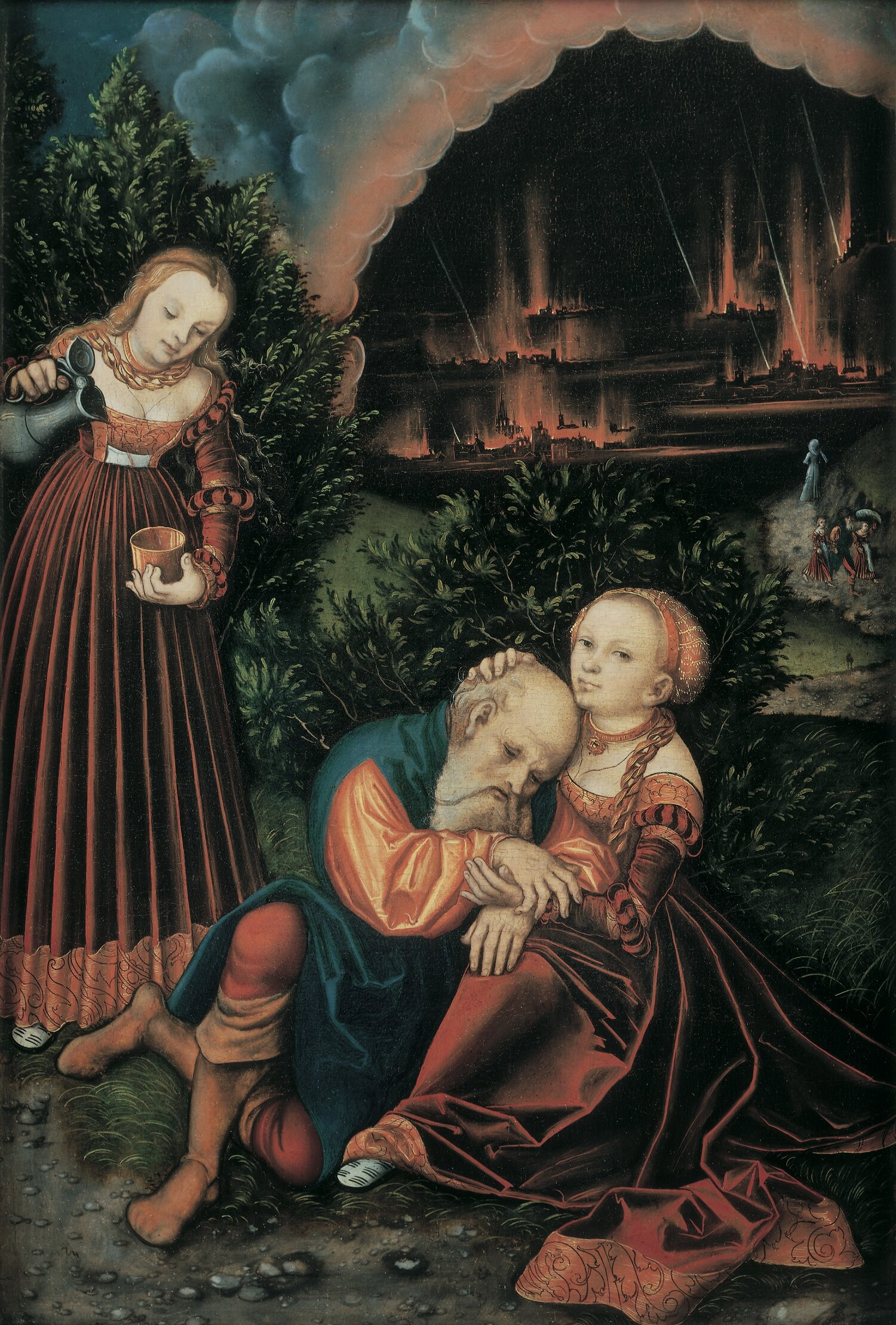
Lot and his daughters by Lucas Cranach the Elder in the Compton Verney Art Gallery.

Compton Verney Art Gallery is an art gallery at Compton Verney, Warwickshire, England. It is housed in Compton Verney House, a restored Grade I listed 18th-century mansion surrounded by 120 acres (49 ha) of parkland which was landscaped by Lancelot 'Capability' Brown.

== Overview ==
The Art Gallery is home to six permanent collections including Neapolitan art from 1600 to 1800; Northern European medieval art from 1450 to 1650; British portraits including paintings of Henry VIII, Elizabeth I, and Edward VI, and works by Joshua Reynolds; Chinese bronzes including objects from the Neolithic and Shang periods; British folk art; and the Enid Marx/Margaret Lambert Collection of folk art from around the world which inspired the textile designs of 20th century artist Enid Marx.

== History ==
In 1993, the Peter Moores Foundation (PMF) bought the site, including the near-derelict mansion, and gifted it to the specially-created charitable trust Compton Verney House Trust (CVHT).

Following a £45 million building project to restore the Grade-I listed Georgian mansion and add a Stanton Williams designed modern wing to house exhibition spaces and visitor facilities, Compton Verney staged a preview season in 1998 on the newly restored ground floor rooms, showcasing the important British Folk Art Collection, which the PMF had already bought from collector Andras Kalman.

Following this Compton Verney continued to engage with people in the local area via a series of outreach projects and art installations within the grounds. Compton Verney fully opened to the public as a major, nationally accredited art gallery in March 2004. The special exhibitions programme offers both historic and contemporary shows and is designed to appeal to a wide audience. The gallery has held many temporary art exhibitions.

== Location ==
The gallery is situated on the B4086 between the villages of Kineton and Wellesbourne. Stratford-upon-Avon lies 14.4 kilometres (8.9 miles) northwest of Compton Verney, with Warwick and Leamington 14.4 kilometres (8.9 miles) to the north. The nearest railway stations to Compton Verney Art Gallery are: Warwick Parkway about 16 kilometres (9.9 miles), Leamington Spa 16 kilometres (9.9 miles) and Banbury 22 kilometres (14 miles) It is 10 kilometres (6.2 miles) from junction 12 of the M40 motorway and is close to Birmingham Airport.

== Internet Meme ==
The painting A Pair of Pigs which is on display at Compton Verney became famous as an internet meme called Brother May I have Some Oats.

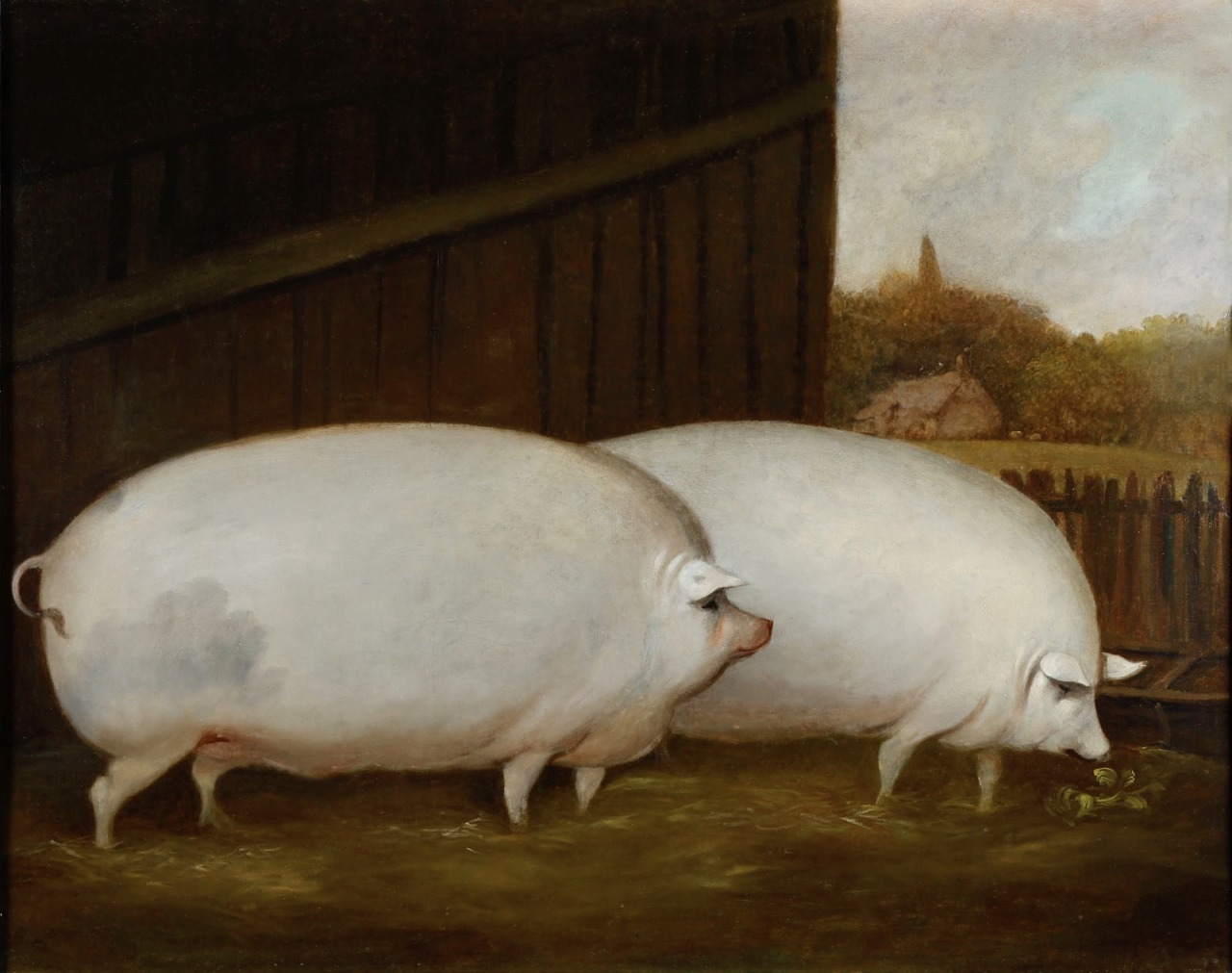
A Pair of Pigs

== See also ==
- Compton Verney House
