= Houghton Hall (disambiguation) =

Houghton Hall may refer to:

- Houghton Hall, stately home in Norfolk, England (Walpole seat)
- Houghton Hall, East Riding of Yorkshire, country house in the East Riding of Yorkshire, England

== See also ==
- Houghton House, ruined mansion in Bedfordshire, England
- Hoghton Tower, fortified manor house in Lancashire, England
