= Houghton Hall, East Riding of Yorkshire =

Listed mansion in the East Riding of Yorkshire, England

Coordinates: 53.8410°N 0.6514°W

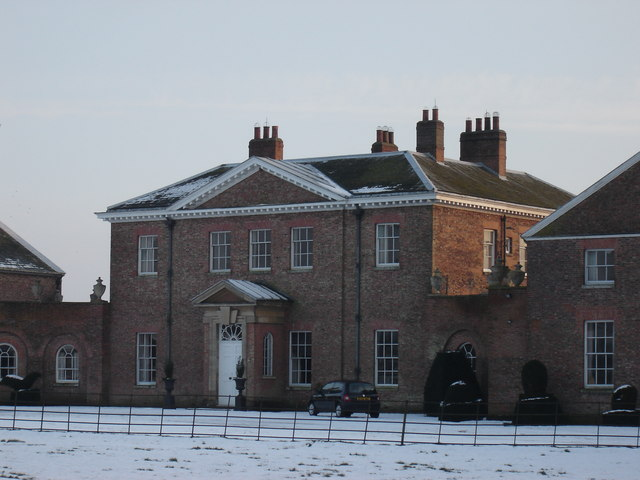
Houghton Hall frontage

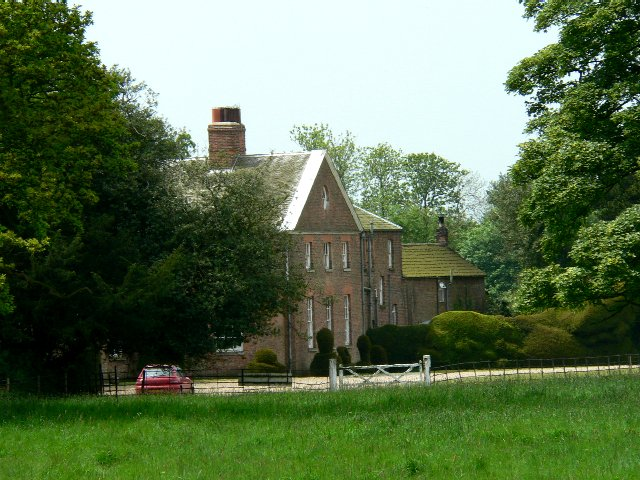
Houghton Hall

Houghton Hall, Sancton, near Market Weighton, is a Grade I listed Georgian country mansion in the East Riding of Yorkshire, England, set in an estate of 7,800 acres (32 km^{2}). Located on the estate is the village of Sancton and the vestigial remains of the ancient hamlet of Houghton. It was built c. 1765–8 by Philip Langdale (d. 1815) to the designs of Thomas Atkinson and underwent minor remodelling in 1960 by Francis Johnson. It is built in pink brick with stone dressing and slate roof, with a three-storey, 5-bay main block.

The Roman Catholic parish of Market Weighton was founded from the domestic chapel of the Langdale family at Houghton Hall. The chapel, built in 1829, was demolished in 1957. The Vale of York Polo Club was formerly located on the Houghton Hall Estate.

== Descent ==
=== de Houghton ===
Sir Thomas de Houghton was the last in the male line of his family seated at the manor. His daughter and heiress, Helen de Houghton, brought the manor to her husband Patrick II de Langdale.

=== Langdale ===
Arms of Langdale of Yorkshire: Sable, a chevron between three estoiles argent. Motto: Foy en Tout ("Faith in all things")

The de Langdale family originated at the manor of Langdale in the hundred of Pickering, Yorkshire, which they held as their seat from before the reign of King John (1199–1216). Patrick II de Langdale was the son and heir of Patrick I de Langdale (fl. temp. Edward II) by his wife Amanda de Elton, daughter and heiress of Lawrence de Elton.

The estate at Houghton descended through the senior branch of the Langdale family from Anthony Langdale until a lack of male succession caused it to pass sideways to a cousin Peter Langdale (d. 1617) of Pighill Hall, Molescroft, near Beverley in Yorkshire, which he had purchased in 1606.

His son was Marmaduke Langdale, 1st Baron Langdale of Holme, whose chief seat was nearby Holme Hall in the parish of Holme-on-Spalding-Moor, Yorkshire. Marmaduke was knighted by King Charles I in 1628, appointed Sheriff of Yorkshire for 1639–40 and became a devoted royalist during the Civil War, during which he fought at the Battle of Marston Moor and at Naseby. On the defeat of the royalist cause, he fled to the continent, where he contacted the future King Charles II and was made by him 1st Baron Langdale "of Holme" in 1658. He afterwards converted to Catholicism. He died in August 1661 at Holme and was buried in All Saints Church, Sancton, where his monument survives along with others to members of the Langdale family. The title became extinct on the death of Marmaduke Langdale, 5th Baron Langdale (d. 1778), who left no male progeny but only two daughters. The house and 1000 acres of land descended to Philip Langdale (d. 1815), the senior male member of the Langdale family, who built the present house in about 1765. The family continued as Catholic recusants, and a year after the house was built, a mission was set up there for a Catholic priest.

=== Stourton (Langdale) ===
Arms of Stourton: Quarterly of 6, 1st: Sable, a bend or between six fountains (Stourton); 2nd: Gules, on a bend between six crosses-crosslet fitchy argent an escutcheon or charged with a demi-lion rampant pierced through the mouth by an arrow within a double tressure flory counterflory of the first (Howard); 3rd: Gules, a lion rampant argent (Mowbray); 4th: Sable, a lion rampant argent ducally crowned or (Segrave); 5th: Gules, three lions passant guardant in pale or armed and langued azure a label of three points argent (Plantagenet (Thomas of Brotherton, 1st Earl of Norfolk)); 6th Gules, a lion rampant within a bordure engrailed or (Talbot)

On the death of Philip Langdale in 1815, the estate passed under his will to his relative, the Hon. Charles Langdale (1787–1868), born the Hon. Charles Stourton, MP and campaigner for Catholic Emancipation, who assumed by royal licence the surname and arms of Langdale in accordance with the terms of the bequest. He was the fourth son of Charles Stourton, 17th Baron Stourton (1752–1816) (whose mother Winifred Howard (d. 1753) (a daughter and co-heiress of Philip Howard (1687/8–1749/50) of Buckenham Tofts in Norfolk) was a co-heiress (in her issue) of her uncles the 8th and 9th Dukes of Norfolk, to the titles Baron Mowbray, Baron Segrave, and many others) by his wife Mary Langdale, a daughter and co-heiress of Marmaduke Langdale, 5th Baron Langdale (1771–1777). He expanded the estate and the house, to which he added in 1829 a classical Greek-style Roman Catholic chapel designed by Joseph Ireland. He was MP for Beverley and Knaresborough. Philip died in 1868 and was succeeded by his eldest son, Charles Joseph Langdale (1822–1895), who had married an Irish heiress and chose to live in Ireland. After the couple both died in 1895, the estate was inherited successively by their eldest son, Henry Joseph Langdale (1853–1923), and their younger son Lieutenant-Colonel Philip Joseph Langdale (1863–1950), OBE, JP, DL.

On Philip's death in 1950, Houghton passed to his eldest daughter Joyce Elizabeth Mary Langdale (1898 – June 1995), then the wife of Henry FitzAlan-Howard, 2nd Viscount FitzAlan of Derwent (1883–1962), from whom she was divorced in 1955 and re-married in 1956 to Thomas Wentworth-Fitzwilliam, 10th Earl Fitzwilliam (1904–1979). Her second husband's home, Wentworth Woodhouse, near Rotherham, Yorkshire, is the largest private residence in England, and with his second seat of Milton Hall, Peterborough, the largest house in Cambridgeshire, also at her disposal, she probably felt little need to retain Houghton for her own use.

=== Watson ===
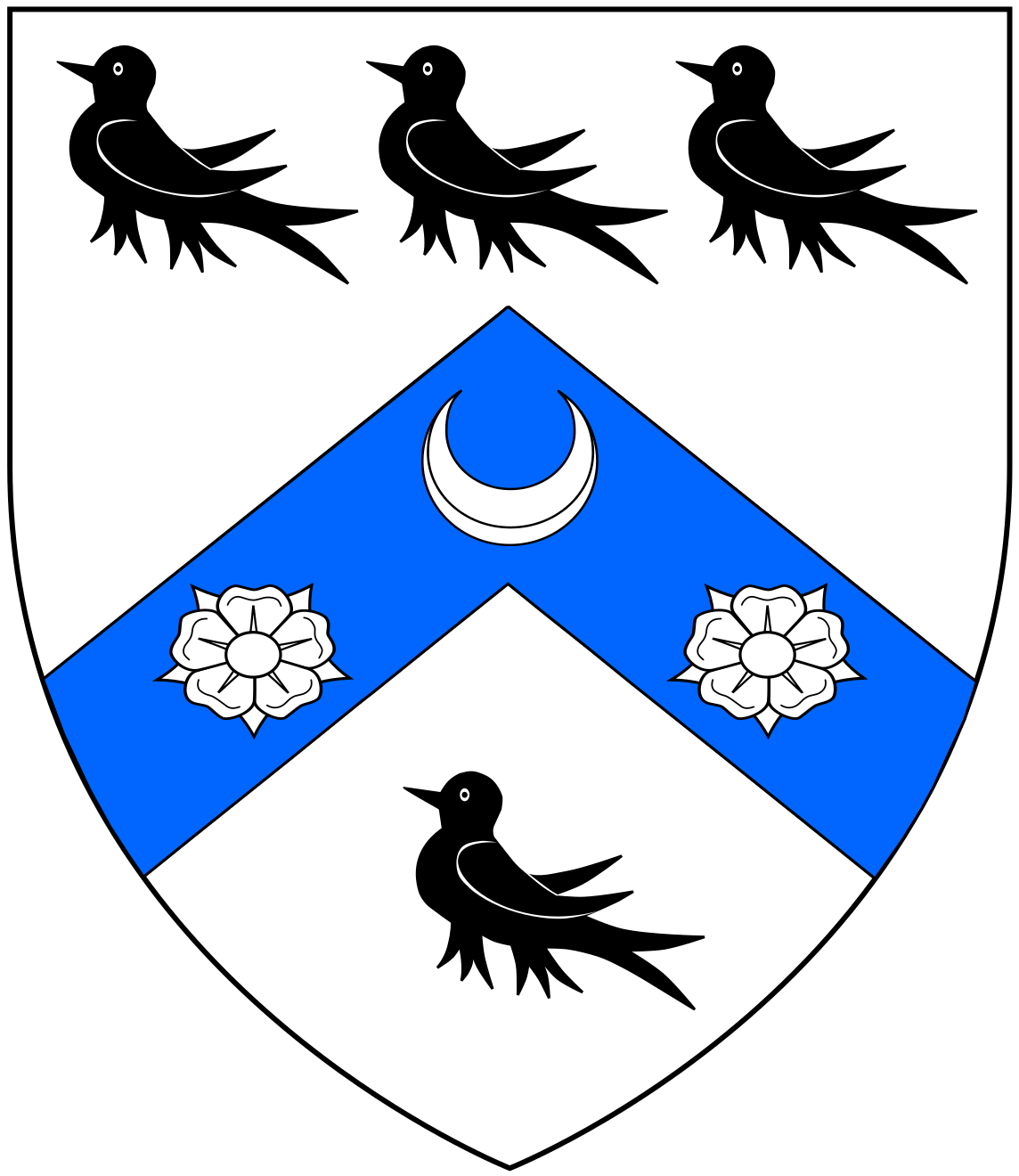
Arms of Watson, Baron Manton: Argent, on a chevron azure between four martlets three in-chief and one in-base sable a crescent between two roses of the field

Joyce Langdale had no male progeny and gave Houghton to her nephew Rupert Watson, 3rd Baron Manton (1924–2003), only son of her younger sister Alethea Alys Mary Pauline Langdale, wife of (George) Miles Watson, 2nd Baron Manton (1899–1968), of Compton Verney, Warwickshire, later of Plumpton Place in Sussex. Rupert was the father of five children and was later senior steward of the Jockey Club. He succeeded his father as 3rd Baron Manton in 1968, and in 1980 was appointed a Deputy Lieutenant of Humberside. On his death in 2003, his title and the estate of Houghton passed to his eldest son, Miles Ronald Marcus Watson, 4th Baron Manton (b. 1958), an officer in the Life Guards and formerly a successful amateur jockey.

== See also ==
- Grade I listed buildings in the East Riding of Yorkshire
- Listed buildings in Sancton
