= Listed buildings in Sancton =

Sancton is a civil parish in the county of the East Riding of Yorkshire, England. It contains ten listed buildings that are recorded in the National Heritage List for England. Of these, one is listed at Grade I, the highest of the three grades, one is at Grade II*, the middle grade, and the others are at Grade II, the lowest grade. The parish contains the village of Rudston and the surrounding countryside. The parish contains the village of Sancton and the surrounding countryside. To the west of the village is the country house Houghton Hall, which is listed together with associated structures. The other listed buildings consist of a church, houses and farmhouses, farm buildings, and a row of estate cottages.

== Key ==
Grade	Criteria
I	Buildings of exceptional interest, sometimes considered to be internationally important
II*	Particularly important buildings of more than special interest
II	Buildings of national importance and special interest

== Buildings ==
Name and location	Photograph	Date	Notes	Grade
All Saints' Church; 53.84370°N 0.63396°W		15th century	The oldest part of the church is the tower, the rest being rebuilt in 1869–70. It is built in stone with a slate roof, and consists of a nave, a south porch, a chancel, and an octagonal west tower. The tower has two stages, diagonal buttresses with crocketed pinnacles, a three-light west window with a hood mould and a lancet window above, two-light pointed bell openings with double transoms and hood moulds, an embattled parapet with crocketed pinnacles, and short flying buttresses to diagonal buttresses with pinnacles.	II*
Manor Farmhouse; 53.83537°N 0.66062°W		Late 17th to early 18th century	The farmhouse, which was later extended to the left, is in limestone with some brick on the original part, in grey brick on the extension, and with a pantile roof, hipped on the left, and with a raised coped gable on the right. There are two storeys, and on the front are a doorway with a fanlight and sash windows, all under segmental heads.	II
Barn east of Inman Cottage; 53.84061°N 0.63087°W	—	Early 18th century	The barn is in limestone, with freestone quoins, brick dressings, and a pantile roof with tumbled-in brick to the raised gables with rounded saddles. There are two storeys and attics, and five bays, and it contains five square openings with segmental heads.	II
Coach house and stabling, Houghton Hall; 53.84137°N 0.65359°W	—	Mid-18th century	The coach house, flanked by stabling, is in red brick with a pantile roof. The coach house is gabled and has two storeys and a single bay. It contains double doors, each under a segmental arch, over which is a tilting window under a segmental arch. The gable has tumbled-in brick and mushroom-shaped finials. The stable wing to the left has five bays, that to the right has four, and they contain doorways, and sash windows, all under cambered gauged brick arches. The gables have tumbled-in brick, and the right gable has mushroom-shaped finials.	II
Houghton Hall; 53.84098°N 0.65137°W		c. 1765–68	The country house is in pink brick, with stone dressings, a timber eaves cornice and hipped slate roofs. The main block has two storeys and five bays, it is flanked by single-storey three-bay quadrant walls leading to pavilions with two storeys and attics and three bays. The main block has modillion eaves and raked cornices, and its middle bay projects under a low pediment. It contains a porch, and a doorway with a fanlight containing radial glazing in an architrave, and a fanned keystone under a pediment. The windows on the block are sashes under cambered gauged brick arches. The quadrant walls each contains three round-headed sash windows with radial glazing in round-headed recesses, over which is coping and four urns. The pavilions have sash windows and pediments containing oculi with radial glazing.	I
Valley Farmhouse; 53.84277°N 0.63262°W	—	1770	The house is in red brick with stone dressings, a stone dentilled eaves cornice, and a pantile roof with tumbled-in brick to the raised gables on stone shaped kneelers, one with a datestone. There are two storeys and attics, three bays, and a rear wing. The central doorway has a fanlight, and the windows are sashes, those on the ground floor with segmental heads, and on the upper floor with flat heads.	II
Dovecote, Houghton Hall; 53.84139°N 0.65418°W	—	Late 18th century	The dovecote is in red brick, with an octagonal pyramidal stone slate roof, and an octagonal plan. On two sides are doorways with segmental heads. On the roof is a lantern with a modillion eaves cornice, pigeon holes, a lead Baroque dome, and a fox weathervane.	II
Ha-ha, Houghton Hall; 53.84060°N 0.65165°W	—	Late 18th century	The ha-ha to the south of the house is in red brick with some limestone, and defines the boundary of the garden.	II
White House; 53.84210°N 0.63525°W		Late 18th to early 19th century	The house is in limestone, whitewashed and rendered on the front, with a pantile roof. There are two storeys, three bays, and a rear outshut under a catslide roof. The doorway is in the centre, above it is a blocked door, and the windows are sash windows. The ground floor openings have segmental heads, and the upper floor windows have flat heads.	II
The White Row; 53.84248°N 0.63352°W	—	c. 1820	A row of five estate cottages in red brick with brick gables and a pantile roof. There are two storeys, and each cottage has two bays. All the cottages have a doorway under a gabled canopy, and the windows are horizontally sliding sash windows, those on the ground floor under segmental heads.	II
