= John Magnier =

Irish business magnate (born 1948)

- Born: 10 February 1948 (age 78); Fermoy, County Cork, Ireland
- Occupation: Coolmore Stud
- Spouse: Susan O'Brien
- Children: 5

Senator
- In office 23 April 1987 – 1 November 1989
- Constituency: Nominated by the Taoiseach

Personal details
- Party: Independent

John Magnier (born 10 February 1948) is an Irish business magnate. He is Ireland's leading thoroughbred stud owner and has extensive business interests outside the horse-breeding industry. He is based at Coolmore Stud at Fethard in County Tipperary.

== Career ==
=== Origins ===
Magnier was born in Fermoy, County Cork, the eldest son of Thomas Magnier, a County Cork landowner. His aunt Mary Elizabeth Hallinan married Rupert Watson, Senior Steward of the Jockey Club from 1982 to 1985.

=== Early and personal life ===
Magnier was educated at Glenstal Abbey in County Limerick but had to leave school at 15 to take charge of the family estate near Fermoy after his father died. He is married to Susan O'Brien, a daughter of Irish racehorse-trainer Vincent O'Brien. The couple have five children.

=== Coolmore Stud ===
Magnier later moved to County Tipperary, where he helped transform Coolmore Stud into a multi-million euro international business. The business is headquartered in County Tipperary where a number of other stud farms are part of an extensive network which includes Longfield and Castlehyde studs. The operation also has branches in Versailles, Kentucky and at Jerrys Plains, New South Wales, Australia.

Magnier began his association with Coolmore in partnership with his father-in-law and champion racehorse trainer, Vincent O'Brien, and Vernon's Pools magnate, Robert Sangster. They developed successful racing horses and breeding stock, mainly by purchasing the progeny of the Canadian stallion Northern Dancer. Eventually, Magnier came to head the operation. His racing business is powered by thoroughbreds trained at Ballydoyle by Aidan O'Brien, plus many others in the care of other trainers.

Champion sires to have stood at Coolmore include Sadler's Wells who was leading sire (by prizemoney won) in Great Britain and Ireland in 14 of the 15 years between 1990 and 2004, though his success in his later years was eclipsed by three other Coolmore stallions, namely Danehill and his own sons Galileo and Montjeu. Other notable Group 1 winners who have turned successfully to stud duties are Danehill Dancer, Giant's Causeway, and Epsom Derby winner High Chaparral.

Less successful at Coolmore was George Washington, winner of the 2,000 Guineas and Queen Elizabeth II Stakes in 2006.. George Washington proved infertile, was returned to racing, and suffered a fatal breakdown in the 2007 Breeders' Cup Classic. George Washington was replaced at stud by another son of Danehill, Holy Roman Emperor, removed from training at the start of his three-year-old season. Eleven of the fifteen winners of The Derby between 1998 and 2012 were sired by Coolmore stallions (High Estate, Fairy King, Grand Lodge, Sadler's Wells (two), Danehill, Montjeu (four) and Galileo)

== Politics ==
When Charles Haughey became Taoiseach after the 1987 election, he nominated Magnier to Seanad Éireann, the upper house of the Oireachtas; Magnier served as senator until the 1989 dissolution.

== Other businesses ==
=== Manchester United ===
Through their joint investment vehicle Cubic Expression, Magnier and J. P. McManus acquired a 28.9% shareholding in Manchester United plc during the early 2000s, becoming the club's largest shareholders.

Magnier developed a close personal friendship with Manchester United manager Alex Ferguson, leading to Ferguson becoming registered part-owner of the champion colt Rock of Gibraltar, who raced in Ferguson's silks and won seven consecutive Group 1 races. Following the horse's retirement to stud, a major dispute emerged regarding breeding rights. Ferguson initiated legal proceedings in the Irish High Court in November 2003, claiming entitlement to half of the horse's lucrative breeding fees, while Magnier maintained the agreement covered racing rights and prize money only.

In response, Cubic Expression leveraged its dominant shareholder position to exert corporate pressure on the Manchester United board, submitting a list of "99 questions" demanding forensic scrutiny of corporate governance, executive payments, and transfer dealings involving Ferguson's agent son, Jason. The legal battle was settled out of court in March 2004, with Ferguson accepting an upfront payment of approximately £2.5 million to drop the claim.

Following the breakdown of relations, Magnier and McManus decided to liquidate their stake. In May 2005, they sold their entire 28.9% holding to American businessman Malcolm Glazer for roughly £227 million, which proved to be the decisive catalyst that enabled Glazer's leveraged buyout and private takeover of the club.

=== Other assets ===
Beyond horse racing and football, Magnier has extensive international property and leisure investments. Alongside McManus and Dermot Desmond, he redeveloped the five-star Sandy Lane resort in St. James, Barbados, and maintains extensive agricultural estates and commercial property portfolios across Ireland, the United Kingdom, and the United States.

== Wealth ==
The Sunday Independent estimated his wealth at €2.3 billion in 2018, although this is conservative as Coolmore Stud is valued at more than €4 billion alone, in addition to his personal property portfolio and other investments and holdings.
