= John Fairfax-Blakeborough =

English writer and folklorist

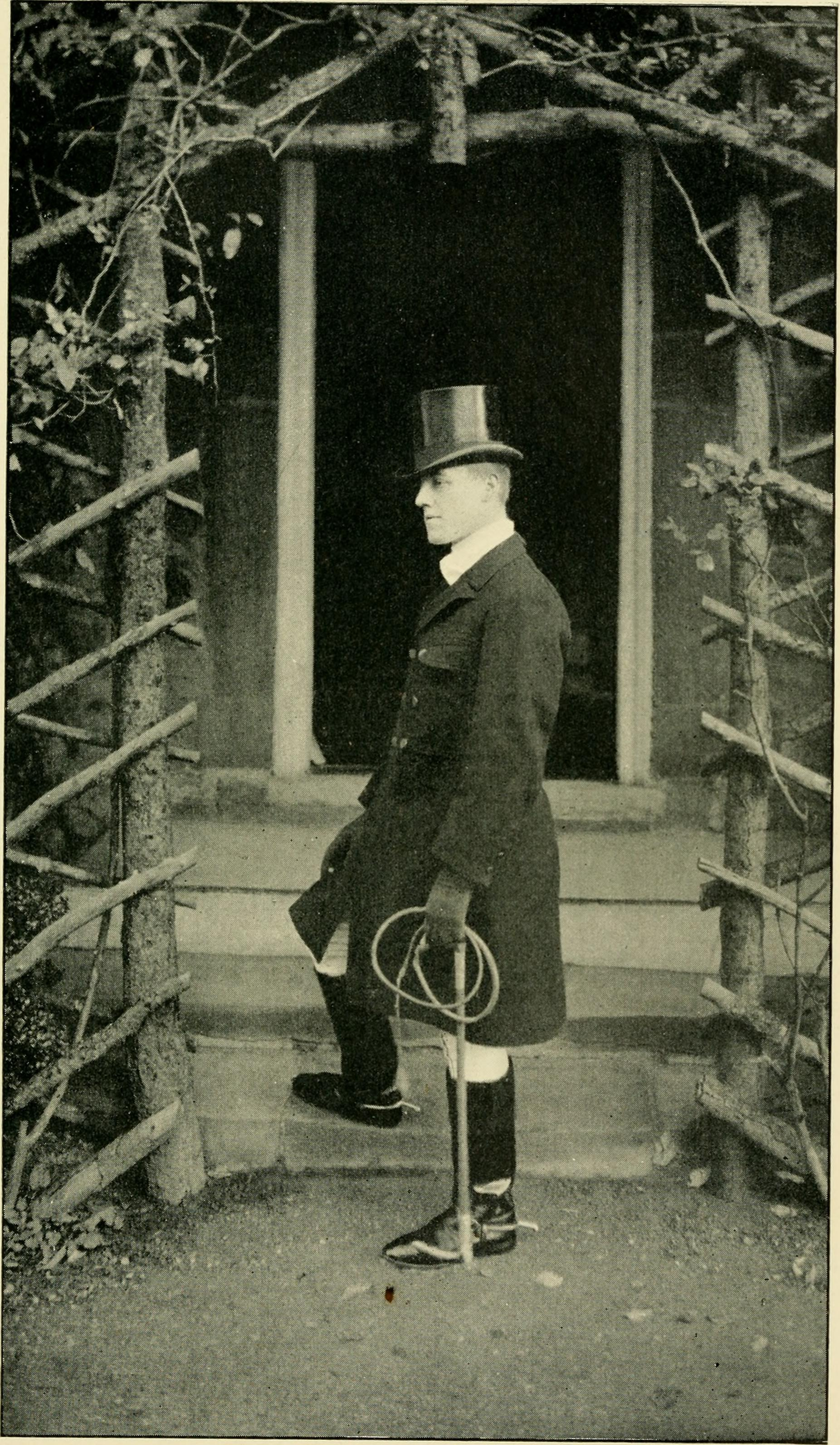
John Fairfax-Blakeborough

Major John "Jack" Fairfax-Blakeborough OBE MC (16 January 1883 – 1 January 1976) was an English writer, historian, and folklorist.

== Early life ==
Fairfax-Blakeborough was born in Guisborough, the second of two children born to his parents. His father, Richard Blakeborough, was a folklorist and dialectologist from Ripon, and a close friend of John Christopher Atkinson. Through his mother, Margaret Blakeborough, Fairfax-Blakeborough was a relative of the Bulmer family. His elder brother, Derrick, died in July 1899.

At a young age, Fairfax-Blakeborough developed an interest in hunting and horse racing. Upon completing school at the age of sixteen, he began working for a broker, but soon decided he wished to pursue a career in writing instead.

== Early career ==
Fairfax-Blakeborough left his position at the broker's office after three months to write for the Middlesbrough Evening Telegraph (today Teeeside Live). In 1904, aged twenty-one, he left regular employment by the paper to become a freelance writer, specialising in articles about equestrian and country sports. He began a column focusing on rural miscellany in 1907 for the Whitby Gazette.

His father disapproved of the decision, fearing that Fairfax-Blakeborough would struggle to make a living through writing. Indeed, shortly after Fairfax-Blakeborough began writing for the Gazette, debts came due and he was forced to ask the editor, Fred Horne, for an advance. Horne agreed, and Fairfax-Blakeborough would later credit this gesture by Horne for his long service and loyalty to the newspaper.

While writing for the Whitby Gazette, Fairfax-Blakeborough began working at the Hambleton racing stables near Sutton Bank, with the intention of developing enough experience to open his own stables in Middleham. He worked there for three years, beginning in 1911; his career plans were interrupted by the 1914 outbreak of the First World War.

== Military service ==
Fairfax-Blakeborough quickly enlisted to fight for the United Kingdom. By this time, his father had come to support his writing career, going so far as to submit columns on Fairfax-Blakeborough's behalf while he was at war. Identified as a strong horse rider, Fairfax-Blakeborough served as a horsemaster and finished the conflict as a Major as part of the 15th The King's Hussars.

Stationed in France for much of the conflict, he was awarded the Military Cross for gallantry during the German spring offensive of 1918. He had also been present at the 1917 Battles of Vimy Ridge and Arras.

== Return to writing ==
Following the war, Fairfax-Blakeborough resumed his writing career. He launched a column entitled "Countryman's Diary" for the Darlington & Stockton Times in September 1922, which also ran until his death. In addition, he wrote periodically for Yorkshire Life magazine, and was a regular contributor to Autocar magazine. Fairfax-Blakeborough also continued his father's work in documenting or investigating Yorkshire folklore, such as a 1922 investigation into the historicity of Peg Fyfe. Richard Blakeborough had also been a researcher of linguistics; in 1929, Fairfax-Blakeborough assisted Alfred Pease in crafting a dictionary of the North Yorkshire dialect.

Outside of journalism, he authored 112 books on the history of horse racing, Yorkshire folklore and the Cleveland Bay horse, writing 13 racing novels in 1930 alone. His wife, Doris, illustrated some of his publications. Among the best known of his works are Yorkshire Days and Yorkshire Ways (1935) and The Spirit of Yorkshire (1954), the latter of which was written with his son Richard. Of his many publications, Fairfax-Blakeborough considered his 1936 book, Letters from a Yeoman to His Son in Society, to be his "best," while acknowledging it was among his publications to sell the least.

Fairfax-Blakeborough's long-running column, "Countryman's Diary," inspired writer Peter Walker, who went on to publish the series of novels that inspired long-running television series Heartbeat. Walker had known Fairfax-Blakeborough since Walker was a child, as they attended the same church in Lealholm.

Alongside his writing career, Fairfax-Blakeborough also served as a racing judge at Sedgefield Racecourse, and took the position of secretary of the Cleveland Bay Horse Society, a post he held for twenty years. He owned, rode and raced his own horses. Upon retiring from his position as a racing official in 1962, after sixty years in the industry, Fairfax-Blakeborough was presented with a solid silver model of a racehorse by Thomas Dugdale, 1st Baron Crathorne, then Senior Steward of the Jockey Club.

== Personal life and death ==
In the 1940s, Fairfax-Blakeborough moved into a property, Low House, in Westerdale near Whitby, where he would remain for the rest of his life. He hunted frequently until the age of 86.

On 1 January 1976, Fairfax-Blakeborough died at his home, survived by his wife Doris and their son, Noel. His final Whitby Gazette column was published posthumously on 3 January 1976. The column was assumed by Peter Walker, under the pseudonym Nicholas Rhea, on the 10th, which Walker continued for 41 years until his own death in 2017. Walker's daughter, Sarah Walker, then took up the mantle, altering the title to "Countryman's Daughter." She continues to publish the column as of 2025.
