= George Cottrell =

British political aide (born 1993)

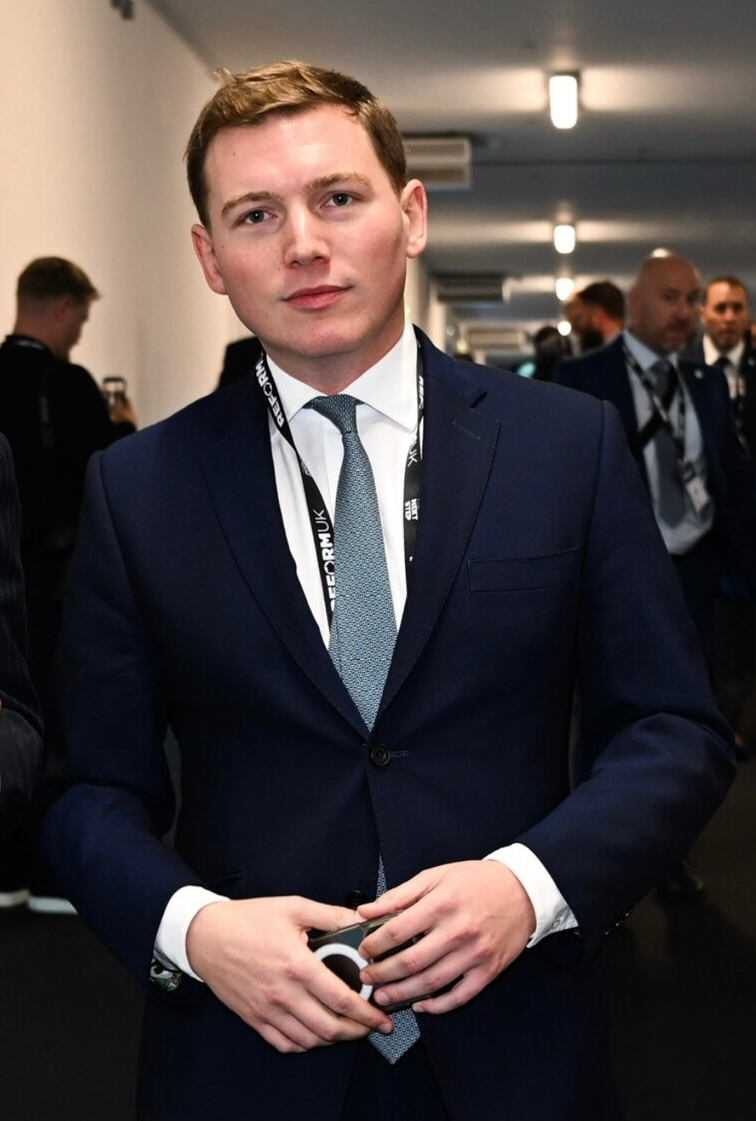
- Cottrell in 2025
- Born: October 1993 (age 33); London, England
- Education: Malvern College
- Occupations: Political aide, financier, author
- Relatives: Alexander Fermor-Hesketh (uncle-in-law); Rupert Watson (maternal grandfather)

George Cottrell (born October 1993), nicknamed Posh George, is a British financier and political aide who is a senior adviser, campaigner and fundraiser for Nigel Farage and leads the political consultancy Geostrategy. Cottrell was convicted of felony wire fraud in the United States in 2017.

== Early life and education ==
Cottrell was born in October 1993 in London, England. His father, Mark Cottrell, a businessman and landowner from Gloucestershire, attended Gordonstoun School with Prince Andrew. His mother, Fiona Watson, a daughter of Rupert Watson, 3rd Baron Manton (d. 2003), is a former glamour model and girlfriend of Charles III when he was Prince of Wales. His uncle Alexander Fermor-Hesketh, 3rd Baron Hesketh, who is married to his maternal aunt Claire Watson, was a Conservative Party politician before joining the UK Independence Party (UKIP).

The Guardian reported that in 2024 his mother had donated £750,000 to Reform UK and a further £1 million to Britain Means Business, a think tank controlled by Reform UK deputy leader Richard Tice.

Cottrell was raised and educated on the island of Mustique, before attending Malvern College, a private boarding school in Worcestershire, from which he was expelled for illegal gambling.

== Career ==
Cottrell was listed as a director in a number of businesses from a young age, both in the UK and overseas. Following the 2015 UK general election, Cottrell, who was also known by the nickname "Posh George", was appointed deputy treasurer of UKIP.

On 22 July 2016, while attending the Republican National Convention with Farage, Cottrell was arrested by IRS Criminal Investigation special agents at Chicago O'Hare International. Cottrell was federally indicted on 21 counts for conspiracy to commit money laundering, wire fraud, blackmail, and extortion. Denied bail by a judge who branded Cottrell a "serious flight risk", he was detained in custody. Cottrell's indictment states how in 2014 he met undercover IRS federal agents in Las Vegas, where he conspired to launder millions of dollars' worth of drug money using offshore bank accounts.

Following a plea agreement in December 2016, prosecutors agreed to dismiss 20 counts in return for a guilty plea to a single count of wire fraud in which Cottrell admitted to explaining various ways criminal proceeds could be laundered. In March 2017 Cottrell was sentenced and released by Judge Diane Humetewa, having served eight months in prison.

While head of fundraising for UKIP Cottrell became the chief of staff to Nigel Farage, who was then UKIP leader. In May 2019 Cottrell was reportedly a fundraiser for the Brexit Party. In 2025 the press reported that Cottrell had launched an international political consultancy, Geostrategy, as an unlimited company. His book How to Launder Money: A Guide for Law Enforcement, Prosecutors, and Policymakers, authored by Cottrell and Lawrence Burke Files, was published by Biteback Publishing in February 2026.

On 8 July 2026, The Times reported that Cottrell had been seen in May 2018 with the far-right activist Tommy Robinson at a political rally.

== Professional gambling ==
According to documents filed in the UK High Court, Cottrell was named as part of a professional betting syndicate linked to Brighton & Hove Albion F.C. owner Tony Bloom. In return for his participation, Cottrell reportedly received a share of winnings, with the syndicate allegedly earning up to $250 million. Cottrell reportedly made over $200 million personally by copying bets from Bloom’s syndicate, Starlizard. Cottrell was reported to be a high-stakes poker player, once losing $20 million in one night.

In October 2025, Yahoo Finance reported that cryptocurrency investigator ZachXBT had identified a Polymarket wallet associated with the username “GCottrell93” as belonging to Cottrell. The account had reportedly bought approximately $9 million of shares betting on Donald Trump winning the 2024 United States presidential election and made about $13 million in winnings. In August 2026, the Financial Times reported that Cottrell had also operated a separate secret Polymarket account, the account placed $18 million in bets on Trump winning the 2024 presidential election, resulting in balance of $29.5 million which was then withdrawn.

== Relationship with Nigel Farage ==
Cottrell is a senior adviser, campaigner and fundraiser for British politician Nigel Farage. In February 2025 The Guardian newspaper stated "Tatler reported earlier this year that Cottrell sometimes referred to Farage as 'Daddy' and that the Reform leader was 'often there, making coffee' at Cottrell's west London house." The Guardian has previously quoted Farage describing Cottrell as "like a son" to him, with Cottrell present at many campaign trail events during the 2024 general election as part of his unpaid role with Reform UK. The Times has reported that Cottrell handed out business cards with a Reform UK logo and Farage's email address.

He is reported to have supported Farage by providing social media and security staff, and also providing Farage with accommodation in his property in London. There is controversy as to whether these should have been reported by Farage in the Register of Members' Financial Interests, with the Reform UK MP Robert Jenrick stating that these were made in a "purely personal capacity". Payments by Cottrell for Farage's travel arrangements had been declared by Farage previously.

== Personal life ==
Cottrell was in a four-year on/off relationship with the reality television star Georgia Toffolo between 2019 and 2023. During an interview with Tatler, as reported by The Guardian, Cottrell shared details of his art collection, which includes works by Banksy, Canaletto and George Stubbs.
