= Peter Moores (businessman) =

British businessman, art collector and philanthropist (1932–2016)

Sir Peter Moores CBE DL
- Moore in a 1977 newspaper
- Born: 9 April 1932; Lancashire, England
- Died: 23 March 2016 (aged 83)
- Occupations: Businessman, art collector, philanthropist

Sir Peter Moores CBE DL (9 April 1932 – 23 March 2016) was a British businessman, art collector and philanthropist who was chairman of the Liverpool-based Littlewoods football pools and retailing business in the United Kingdom between 1977 and 1980. He was appointed CBE in 1991, appoint Deputy Lieutenant of Lancashire in 1992, and knighted in 2003.

== Early Life ==
Peter Moore was born on 9 April 1932 in Lancashire, England. His father, Sir John Moores, was the founder of the Littlewoods company, though the family no longer owns it. In the Sunday Times Rich List 2006 the Moores' family wealth was estimated at £1,160m. Peter Moores was educated at Eton College and Christ Church, Oxford. His elder sister Lady Grantchester (née Betty Moores), who died in 2019, was the widow of Kenneth Bent Suenson-Taylor, 2nd Baron Grantchester (1921–1995).

== Career ==
=== Peter Moores Foundation ===
At the age of 32 in 1964, Moores set up the charity Peter Moores Foundation supporting music and the visual arts, but also education, health, social and environmental projects. The Foundation continued in existence until 5 April 2014, when its funds were exhausted. During its fifty years, it donated over £231 million to the causes it supported.

The Peter Moores biennial contemporary art exhibitions were held at the Walker Art Gallery in Liverpool from 1971 to 1986. In 1994 the foundation enabled a permanent Transatlantic Slave Trade Gallery at the Liverpool Merseyside Maritime Museum.

The Foundation began a variety of charitable support initiatives in Barbados in 1973 – these activities became a separately constituted organization in 2011.

In 1993 the Foundation bought Compton Verney House in Warwickshire, which was then categorized as a building 'at risk', and transferred the ownership to a Trust supported by the Foundation. In March 2004 the Compton Verney Gallery at the House was opened by Prince Charles. The Gallery has a permanent collection, and varied art collections and temporary exhibitions are also presented.

From 1970 to 2010 the Foundation supported the Opera Rara classical music label. It awarded scholarships to young British singers, including Amanda Roocroft and Simon Keenlyside. It has also supported the Opera in English project.

The Foundation provided funding for health projects in the UK and overseas, particularly in the field of HIV/AIDS. It also supported a range of youth and education projects.

To mark its final phase the Foundation's Swansong Project made donations to enable eight new productions in 2014/5 by British opera companies, including the British premiere of George Benjamin's Written on Skin at the Royal Opera House, Terry Gilliam's production of Berlioz's Benvenuto Cellini, and three production of operas by Donizetti at the Welsh National Opera.

== Death ==
Moores died on 23 March 2016 following a stroke.
