= Thomas Jackson (bishop-designate of Lyttelton) =

English clergyman (1812–1886)

- Born: 1 September 1812; Preston, Lancashire, England
- Died: 18 March 1886 (aged 73); London, England
- Occupations: Clergyman, writer

Thomas Jackson (1 September 1812 – 18 March 1886), was an English Anglican clergyman appointed in 1850 as Bishop Designate of the newly founded settlement of Lyttelton in New Zealand. After disagreements with the New Zealand colonists, Jackson never took up the bishopric, and instead returned to England. He was an early advocate of animal welfare.

== Early life ==
Jackson was born in 1812 to a Wesleyan clergyman. His father was Thomas Jackson and his mother was Ann Hollinshead. He was educated at St Saviour's School in Southwark, and St Mary Hall, Oxford where he graduated BA in 1834 and MA in 1837.

== Appointment as Bishop Designate ==
In 1844, aged 32, Jackson was appointed Principal of St John's Training College for teachers at Battersea. This college trained teachers for English Church schools. Jackson retained this position until he was named as the Bishop Designate of Lyttelton in New Zealand. At the time, it was envisaged that the principal town in the new settlement would be Lyttelton, not Christchurch which eventually did become the main locality. He was named to the position in June 1850 and from that time until he sailed for New Zealand in September of that same year he addressed many meetings on behalf of the Canterbury Association, which was promoting immigration. He did much to further the cause of immigration.

A legal problem emerged some time before the first immigrant ships left England for Canterbury. The Letters Patent appointing Dr. George Selwyn (Bishop of Lichfield) as the Bishop of New Zealand had no clause providing for a resignation of part of the New Zealand Diocese which would have been needed if another person were to be appointed in Canterbury. It was determined that the Diocese of Lyttelton should include all of the South Island, whereas Dr. Selwyn wished to resign from only the Canterbury Settlement and Otago.

== New Zealand ==
In view of these irregularities, Jackson undertook to visit New Zealand and discuss the matter with Selwyn; he arrived in Lyttelton on 7 February 1851 on the Castle Eden. He had in his possession a document for Selwyn's signature which would have Selwyn resign the See of New Zealand. In the end, another document was signed by him in which he only resigned the Canterbury and Otago areas. There was some doubt about the legality of this document.

Jackson then proposed to return to England to have the matter regularised with the Archbishop of Canterbury. It appears that he also wished to be consecrated Bishop by the highest Church authority to ensure his position. He was then to return to Lyttelton and take up his post. The sail each way was around one hundred days, and Jackson's wife, Elizabeth, who travelled out with him to New Zealand, did not wish to follow him on his visit to the Archbishop of Canterbury. Two of their children also accompanied them to New Zealand, travelling on the sailing ship "Castle Eden" which was the fifth ship chartered by the Canterbury Association for carrying emigrants. It arrived in Lyttelton in February 1851.

Jackson was only in Canterbury (New Zealand) for six weeks but he was very active in church matters, and travelled extensively during that time. A long report was written by Jackson to the Archbishop of Canterbury, (England) presumably on the homeward voyage. It is likely that he made notes at the time of his travels. He had arrived back in England during September 1851 after visiting Sydney. When reading the report, it was fully obvious that he intended to return to Canterbury to take up his position. This was not to be. Jackson, despite his earlier good reputation, was not popular in Canterbury. He lost the support of the locals, and had some difficulties with the Canterbury Association. He never took up the bishopric to which he had been appointed.

== Animal welfare ==
Jackson was an advocate of animal welfare. He authored the books Our Dumb Companions and Our Dumb Neighbours. The former was dedicated to the Earl of Harrowby. Jackson's books on animals were published by S.W. Partridge & Co. The publisher described the books as "publications on kindness to animals".

== Later life ==
In order to cover up Jackson's non-return to New Zealand, a face-saving announcement was made claiming that Jackson’s wife was unable to undertake another long voyage because of sickness. A rector's position was found for him at St Mary's, Stoke Newington, in England, where he developed a reputation as preacher and he had held the Prebendary of Weldland at St Paul's Cathedral from 1850. Jackson died in 1886.

Thomas Jackson has sometimes been referred to as the Bishop Designate of Canterbury but this is not strictly correct. His title was the Bishop Designate of Lyttelton. Therefore, his title was, and is, unique. The first Bishop actually appointed to Christchurch was Henry Harper.

== Selected publications ==
- Uniomachia (1833) as "Habbakukius Dunderheadius", coauthored with "Heavysternius" (William Sinclair) and "Slawkenbergius" (Robert Scott)
- A Compendium of Logic (1836)
- Our Dumb Companions (1864)
- Curiosities of the Pulpit (1868)
- Our Dumb Neighbours (1870)
- Our Feathered Companions (1870)
- Stories About Animals (1874)
