= Baron Manton =

Barony in the Peerage of the United Kingdom

Arms of Watson, Baron Manton: Argent, on a chevron azure between four martlets three in-chief and one in-base sable a crescent between two roses of the field

Baron Manton, of Compton Verney in the County of Warwick, is a title in the Peerage of the United Kingdom. It was created on 25 January 1922 in recognition of war services for the Leeds industrialist Joseph Watson. As of 2019 the title is held by his great-grandson, the fourth Baron, who succeeded his father in 2003.

The family seat is Houghton Hall, near Market Weighton, Yorkshire.

== Barons Manton (1922) ==
- Joseph Watson, 1st Baron Manton (1873–1922)
- (George) Miles Watson, 2nd Baron Manton (1899–1968)
- (Joseph) Rupert Eric Robert Watson, 3rd Baron Manton (1924–2003)
- Miles Ronald Marcus Watson, 4th Baron Manton (b. 1958)

The heir apparent is the present holder's elder son Hon. Thomas Nigel Charles David Watson (b. 1985)
