= Sancton (surname) =

Sancton is a surname. Notable people with the surname include:

- Thomas Sancton Sr. (1915–2012), American novelist and journalist, father of Tom
- Tom Sancton (born 1949), American writer, jazz clarinetist, and educator
