= Thomas Jackson (minister) =

English Wesleyan minister and writer

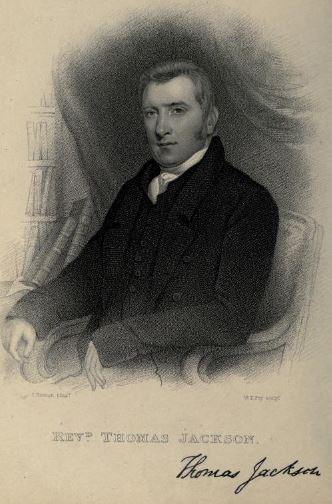

President of the Methodist Conference
- In office 1838–1839
- Preceded by: Edmund Grindrod
- Succeeded by: Theophilus Lessey
- In office 1849–1850
- Preceded by: Robert Newton
- Succeeded by: John Beecham

Personal details
- Born: 12 Dec 1783 Sancton, East Yorkshire
- Died: 10 March 1873 (aged 89) Shepherd's Bush, London
- Children: Thomas Jackson

Thomas Jackson (1783–1873), was an English Wesleyan minister and writer who acted as chair of divinity of the Richmond Theological College and president of the Methodist Conference during the mid-nineteenth century.

== Biography ==
Thomas Jackson, the second son of Thomas and Mary Jackson, was born at Sancton, a small village in the East Riding of Yorkshire, on 12 December 1783. His father was an agricultural labourer. Three of the sons, Robert, Samuel, and Thomas, became ministers in the Wesleyan Methodist Church. Thomas was mainly self-taught, leaving school at the age of twelve to work on a farm. Three years later he was apprenticed to a carpenter at Shipton, a neighbouring village. At every available moment he read and studied, and in July 1801 joined the Methodist society and threw his energies into biblical study and religious work. In September 1804 he was sent by the Wesleyan conference as an itinerant preacher into the Spilsby circuit. For twenty years he laboured in the Wesleyan Methodist Church in the same capacity, occupying some of the most important circuits, such as Preston and Wakefield, Manchester, Lincoln, Leeds, and London. His position and influence grew rapidly. From 1824 to 1842 he was editor of the Wesleyan Methodist magazines, and, despite his lack of a liberal education in youth, he performed his duties with marked success. The conference elected him in 1842 to the chair of divinity in the Theological College at Richmond, Surrey, where he remained until 1861.

In 1838 Jackson was chosen as president of the Wesleyan Methodist Conference. A hundred years had just passed since the formation of the first Methodist Society by the Wesley brothers, and Jackson prepared a centenary volume describing the origin and growth of methodism, and the benefits springing from it (1839). In the centenary celebrations he played a leading part, and preached before the conference in Brunswick Chapel, Liverpool, the official sermon, which occupied nearly three hours in delivery. The sermon was published, and had a very large circulation.

Jackson was re-elected president in 1849, when the Methodist community was agitated by the so-called reform movement and the expulsion of James Everett, Samuel Dunn, and Griffiths. Jackson throughout the crisis showed great tact and dignity.

He retired from Richmond College and from full work as a Wesleyan minister in 1861. At the same time his private library was bought by James Heald for £1,000 and given to Richmond College. After leaving Richmond he resided with his daughter, Mrs. Marzials, first in Bloomsbury, and afterwards in Shepherd's Bush, where he died on 10 March 1873. Jackson's style as a preacher was simple and lucid. As a theologian he belonged to the school of John Wesley and Fletcher of Madeley. He was buried in Richmond Old Burial Ground on 14 March 1873.

== Works ==
With occasional sermons and pamphlets, Jackson wrote:

- Life of John Goodwin, A.M., comprising an Account of his Opinions and Writings, London, 1822; new edition, 1872.
- Memoirs of the Life and Writings of the Rev. Richard Watson, 1834.
- The Centenary of Wesleyan Methodism: a Brief Sketch of the Rise, Progress, and Present State of the Wesleyan Methodist Societies throughout the World, 1839.
- Expository Discourses on various Scripture Facts, 1839.
- The Life of the Rev. Charles Wesley, 2 vols., London, 1841.
- The Journal of the Rev. Charles Wesley, with Selections from his Correspondence and Poetry; with an Introduction and Notes, 2 vols., London, 1849.
- The Life of the Rev. Robert Newton, D.D., 1855.
- The Duties of Christianity theoretically and practically considered, 1857.
- The Providence of God, viewed in the Light of Holy Scripture, 1862.
- Aids to Truth and Charity, 1862.
- The Institutions of Christianity, exhibited in their Scriptural Character and Practical Bearing, London, 1868.
- Recollections of my own Life and Times, edited by the Rev. B. Frankland, B.A.; with an introduction and a postscript by the Rev. G. Osborn, D.D., London, 1873.

Jackson also edited, with a preface or introductory essay:

- The Works of the Rev. John Wesley 14 vols., London, 1829–31
- John Goodwin's Exposition of Romans ix., with two other Tracts by the same, London, 1834
- The Christian armed against Infidelity, 1837
- Memoirs of Miss Hannah Ball, 1839
- A Collection of Christian Biography, 12 vols. 1837–1840
- Anthony Farindon's Sermons, 4 vols., 1849
- Wesley's Journals, 4 vols. 1864
- The Lives of the Early Methodist Preachers, 6 vols. 1865.

== Family ==
In 1809 Jackson married Ann, daughter of Thomas Hollinshead of Horncastle. She died on 24 September 1854, aged 69. The Rev. Thomas Jackson was their son. Their daughter Mary Ann married in 1834 Antoine Théophile Marzials, and was mother of Theo Marzials.

Samuel Jackson (1785–1861), Thomas Jackson's younger brother, was president of the Methodist Conference at Liverpool in 1847, and died at Newcastle upon Tyne during the session of the conference there in August 1861.
