= Miles Watson, 2nd Baron Manton =

English peer and racehorse breeder (1899–1968)

Miles Watson, 2nd Baron Manton (right) with brother R F Watson, Directors of Newmarket Bloodstock Ltd. Company Christmas card portrait circa 1960

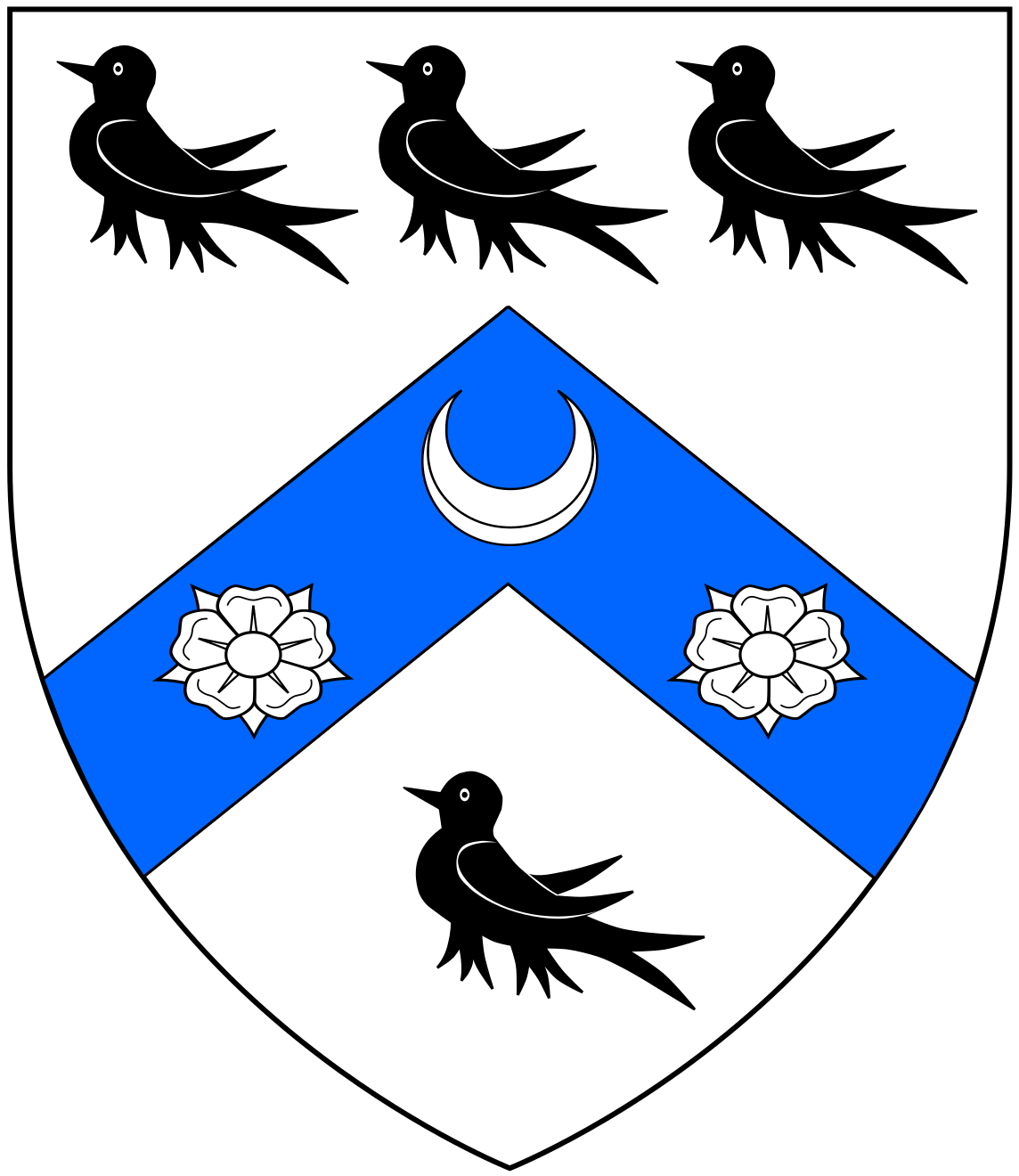
Arms of Watson, Baron Manton: Argent, on a chevron azure between four martlets three in-chief and one in-base sable a crescent between two roses of the field

Miles Watson, 2nd Baron Manton (1899–1968; born George Miles Watson) of Compton Verney, Warwickshire and Plumpton Place, East Sussex, was an English peer and racehorse breeder.

== Origins ==
George Miles Watson was born on 21 June 1899. He was the eldest son of Joseph Watson, 1st Baron Manton (1873–1922), the Leeds soap magnate, by his wife (Frances) Claire Nickols, daughter of Harold Nickols of Sandford House, Kirkstall, Leeds. Watson had three younger brothers, Robert Fraser, Alastair Joseph, and Richard Mark Watson, all born by 1906. He was educated at Harrow.

== Succeeds father ==
He succeeded as 2nd Baron Manton on the death of his father in 1922. In 1927 he sold the Manton estate and racehorse training establishment near Marlborough, Wiltshire, which had been purchased by his father. In 1929 he sold the Compton Verney estate to Samuel Lamb, a cotton manufacturer from Manchester. However (with much general disapproval (see reports in The Times newspaper)) before the sale he removed the mediaeval stained glass (with heraldry of the Verney family) from the chapel, which he sold in 1931 in four lots at Christie's. Much went to the US, although some is now in the Burrell Collection in Glasgow and in the Market Hall Museum, Warwick.

== Career ==
In the 1920s Manton had been a jockey under National Hunt Rules. having sold his father's briefly-owned seat of Compton Verney, in 1938 he purchased Plumpton Place near Lewes in Sussex, where he established a racehorse stud. Hard Sauce, produced there, sired the winner of the 1958 Derby, Hard Ridden. For the British Bloodstock Agency, he travelled to India and South America. With his brother Robert he was a director of Newmarket Bloodstock Ltd.

== Marriages and progeny ==
He married twice:

- Firstly on 18 April 1923, to Alethea Alys Mary Pauline Langdale, 2nd daughter and co-heiress of Lt.Col. Philip Joseph Langdale, OBE, JP, DL, of Houghton Hall, Sancton, Yorkshire. Alathea filed for divorce in 1934, which was granted in 1936.
- Secondly on 1 June 1938, he married Leila Joan Reynolds daughter of Major Philip Guy Reynolds, DSO and formerly the wife of Lt.Col. John Dane Player III (1903–1943), of Friars Well, Wartnaby, Leicestershire, who was killed in action in the Middle East in 1943, a director of John Player & Sons tobacco manufacturers founded by his grandfather, and of Imperial Tobacco, who had cited Manton in his own divorce proceedings, starting in 1937. She became after Manton's death Lady Brownlow, having married, as his 3rd wife, Peregrine Cust, 6th Baron Brownlow of Belton House, Grantham, Lincolnshire.

== Death ==
Manton died in June 1968 at his home Plumpton Place. On his death, the title passed to his son and only child by his first wife Alethea Langdale, Rupert Watson, 3rd Baron Manton.

Peerage of the United Kingdom
Preceded by Joseph Watson	Baron Manton; 1922–1968	Succeeded by Rupert Watson
