= Sancton =

Village and civil parish in the East Riding of Yorkshire, England

Coordinates: 53.841984°N 0.631691°W

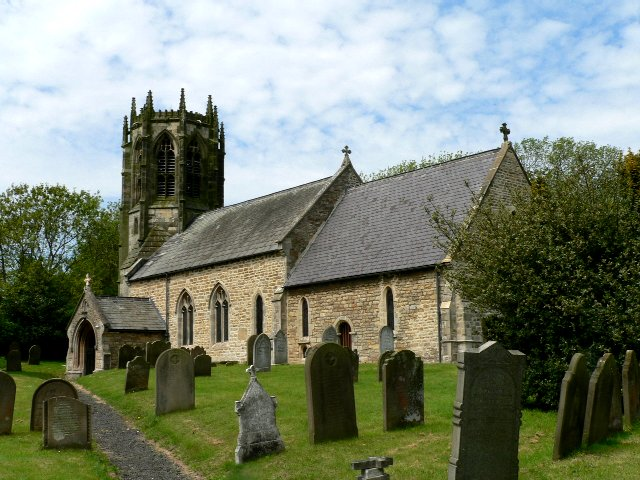
- All Saints' Church, Sancton

- Location within the East Riding of Yorkshire
- Population: 286 (2011 census)
- OS grid reference: SE901392
- Civil parish: Sancton
- Unitary authority: East Riding of Yorkshire
- Ceremonial county: East Riding of Yorkshire
- Region: Yorkshire and the Humber
- Country: England
- Sovereign state: United Kingdom
- Post town: YORK
- Postcode district: YO43
- Dialling code: 01430
- Police: Humberside
- Fire: Humberside
- Ambulance: Yorkshire
- UK Parliament: Goole and Pocklington

For people with the surname, see Sancton (surname).

Sancton is a village and civil parish in the East Riding of Yorkshire, England. It is situated approximately 2 miles (3.2 km) south-east of the market town of Market Weighton on the A1034 road. The civil parish is formed by the village of Sancton and the hamlet of Houghton. According to the 2011 UK census, Sancton parish had a population of 286, a reduction of one on the 2001 UK census figure.

== History ==
Sancton is known to have been a place where Roman mercenaries were billeted to defend their empire against northern tribes or Anglo-Saxon raiders. A cemetery probably founded by the mercenaries was used until around the year 650. Sancton is mentioned in the Domesday Book as belonging to Robert Malet. The name derives from the Old English sand-tūn, meaning sand town.

Besides being the birthplace of Robert, Samuel and Thomas Jackson who were noted Wesleyan preachers, John Wesley himself preached in the village in June 1788.

The church dedicated to All Saints was designated a Grade II* listed building in 1967 and is now recorded in the National Heritage List for England, maintained by Historic England.

== Notable people ==
- Thomas Jackson, Wesleyan minister, born in Sancton
- Marmaduke Langdale, English Civil War participant, buried at Sancton

== See also ==
- Listed buildings in Sancton
