= Plumpton Place =

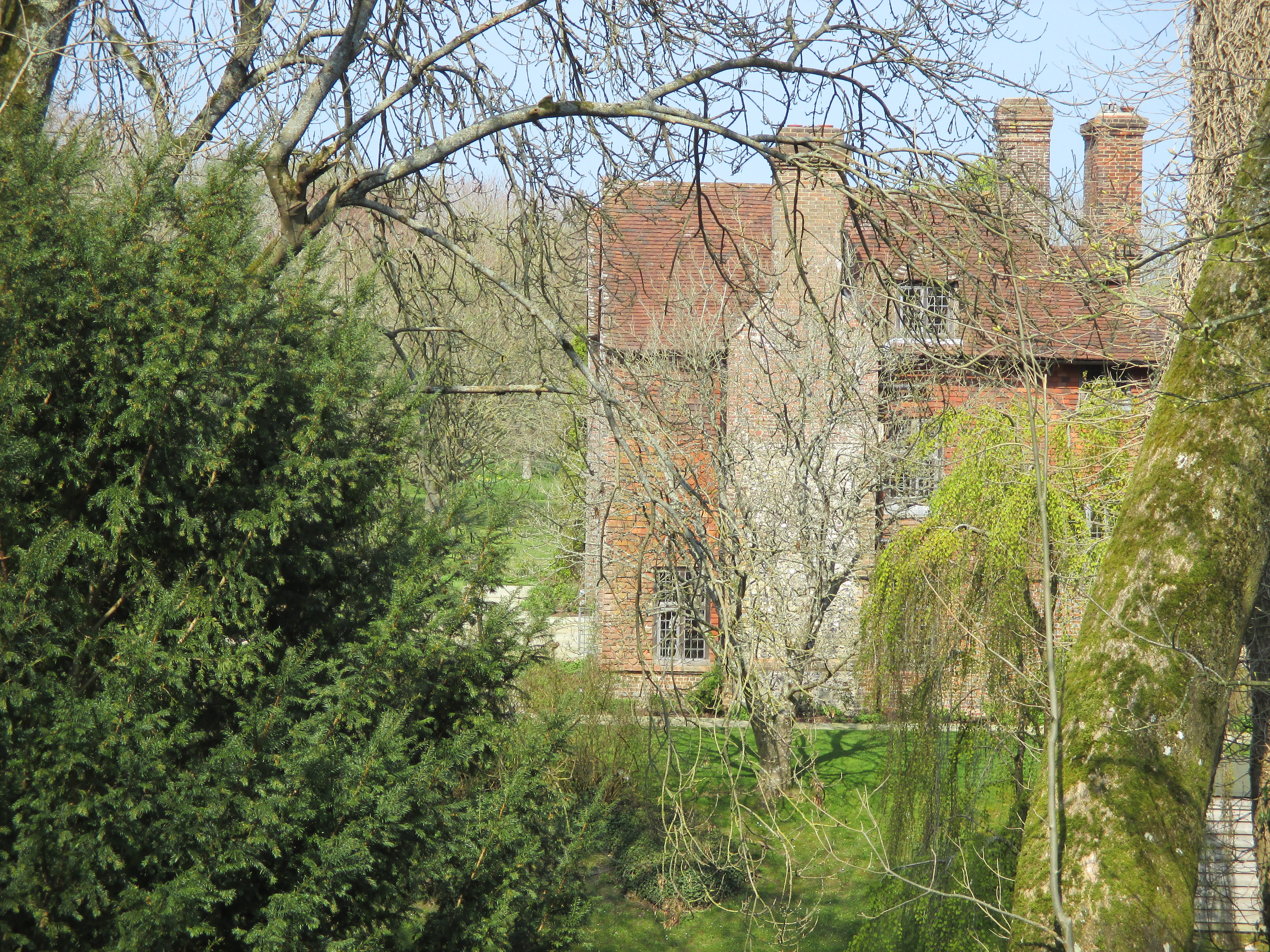

- Location within East Sussex
- 50°54′16″N 0°04′00″W
- Type: Manor house
- Location: Plumpton
- OS grid reference: TQ 36045 13453

History
- Built: 1568

Site notes
- Area: East Sussex
- Architectural style: Elizabethan

Listed Building – Grade II*
- Official name: Plumpton Place
- Designated: 17 March 1952
- Reference no.: 1274171

Plumpton Place is a Grade II* listed Elizabethan manor house in Plumpton, East Sussex, England.

== Description ==
Plumpton Place looks onto the nearby north-facing escarpment of the South Downs, with Plumpton College (formerly Plumpton Agricultural College) and the 11th-century church of St Michael's and All Angels immediately adjacent to the west and the villages of Plumpton, East Sussex and Plumpton Green some 0.5 km (0.31 mi) and 1.5 km (0.93 mi) to the north. There is an entrance formed of two cottages designed by Sir Edwin Lutyens, with a Palladian porch and this leads to his modern bridge over the moat.

It was built in 1568 on the site of an earlier house which was mentioned in the Domesday Book. The North and South parts of the house date from the 1400s, some of which incorporates local flint.

Various building materials have been used in the construction of the house. It is believed that the north wing is the earliest, as there is a date-stone of 1568 with the initials I.M. The west wing seems to date from a later period, circa 1600. Over a hundred years later there was a period of rebuilding in brick and some additions by Lutyens. There are lakeside gardens by Edwin Lutyens and Gertrude Jekyll, within large grounds, that include both woodland and pasture.

== Past owners ==
Plumpton Place was formerly the home of George Miles Watson, 2nd Baron Manton (1899–1968), who maintained a race-horse stud there.

In 1927, it was purchased by Edward Hudson, the founder of Country Life magazine. Hudson initiated a major restoration of the property, which had gone into a state of disrepair, by hiring Lutyens to revamp the main house and mill house, and Jekyll to oversee the 60 acres of land and lakes.

In 1969, a doctor bought the property after the previous owner – a woman with a distaste for longhaired rock stars – refused to sell it to George Harrison of the Beatles and his wife Pattie Boyd. Three years later, however, the same doctor sold it to Led Zeppelin guitarist Jimmy Page. The latter owned the property from 1972 to 1985. The American financier Thomas Perkins owned Plumpton Place for many years.

The roof was badly damaged in the Great Storm of 1987, necessitating the sale of decades long-held leases in order to pay for the repairwork. Due to the building's historic status, permanent repairs required approval from heritage authorities (such as English Heritage, now Historic England). These required detailed proposals, first-hand impact assessments, and lengthy consultations to ensure compliance with conservation principles, significantly delaying the restoration work. Temporary tarpaulin coverings remained in place for several years until the final repairs were completed in October 1991.
