= Richard Reynell =

Richard Reynell may refer to:

- Sir Richard Reynell (knight), Sheriff of Devon, 1191–94
- Sir Richard Reynell, knight of Pyttney, knight
- Richard Reynell (died 1585) (1519–1585), English MP
- Sir Richard Reynell (died 1633) (c. 1558–1633), barrister and probably MP for Mitchell
- Sir Richard Reynell, 1st Baronet (c. 1626–1699), MP for Ashburton 1690–1695 and Lord Chief Justice of Ireland
- Sir Richard Reynell, 2nd Baronet (1673–1723), Anglo-Irish politician and landowner
- Richard Reynell (died 1735) (1681–1735), MP for Ashburton 1702–1708 and 1711–1734
- Richard Reynell (pilot) (1912–1940), Australian fighter pilot in the Second World War

== See also ==
- Reynell (surname), surname is an early form of the Reynolds (surname)
