= Reynell =

Reynell may refer to:

- Electoral district of Reynell, electoral district of the House of Assembly in the Australian state of South Australia
- Reynell Coates (1802–1886), American physician, scientist, teacher, and poet
- Reynell Cotton (1717–1779), President of the Hambledon Club in 1773 and 1774

== See also ==
- Reynell (surname), early form of the Reynolds surname
- Reynell Baronets
