= Sir Richard Reynell, knight of Pyttney =

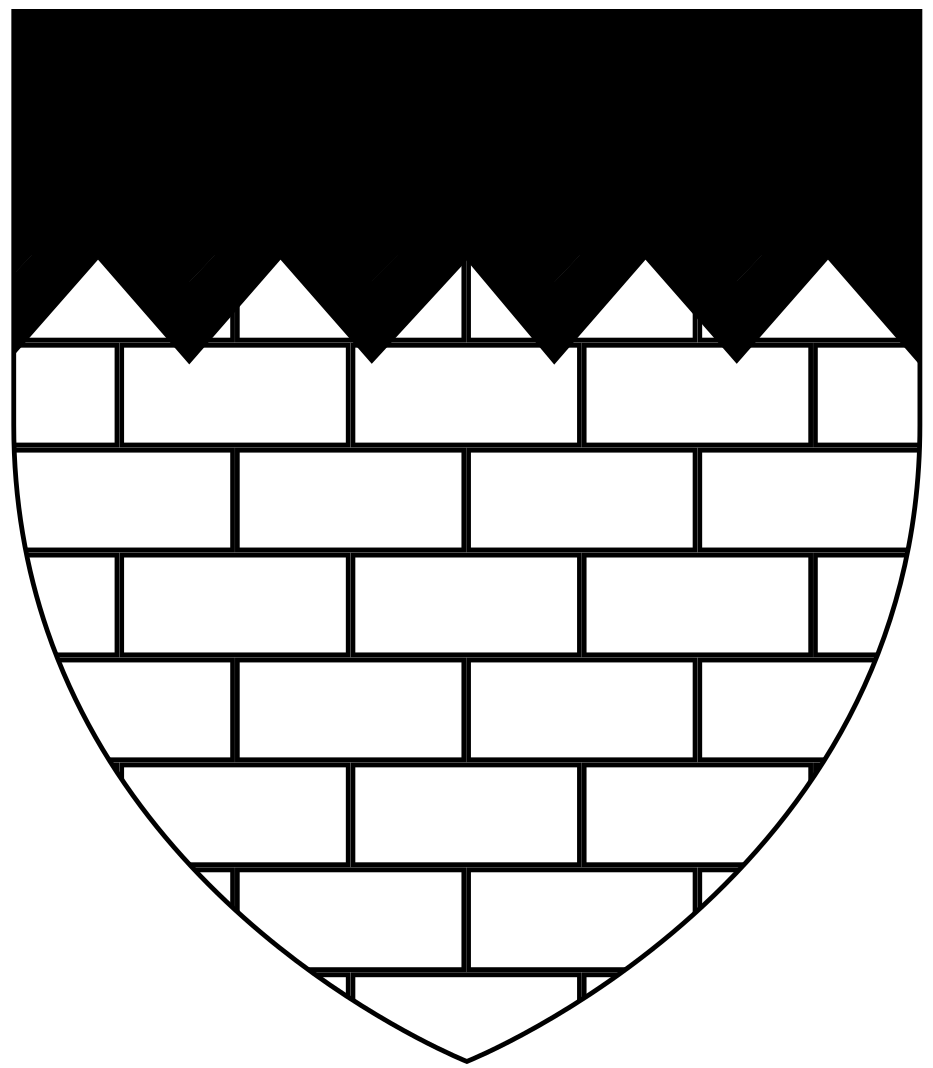
Arms of Reynell, adopted at the start of the age of heraldry (circa 1200–1215): Argent, masonry sable a chief indented of the second

Sir Richard Reynell, son of Sir Richard Reynell, of Pyttney (Pitney today), was a knight to whom King John restored the lands of which his father had been deprived, on condition that he should serve him with horse and armour for one year. Details of this arrangement appear in a deed dated at Bined, 27 July 1214, a copy of which is in the Harleian MSS. No. 1195.

Richard grandson was Walter Reynell, who married Maude de Trumpington, daughter and heiress of Everard de Trumpington of Trumpington in Cambridgeshire, and their son was John Reynell (d.1363/4) of Trumpington, a Member of Parliament for Cambridgeshire in 1351/2, who in 1328 was granted by King Edward III freewarren in his lands in Warwickshire. John Reynell's grandson was Walter Reynell who married Margaret Stighull, daughter and heiress of William Stighull of Malston in the parish of Sherford and of East Ogwell in Devonshire. His descendants settled at East Ogwell and at adjoining West Ogwell in Devon. A junior branch of the family became the Reynell Baronets of Laleham.
