= Reynell (surname) =

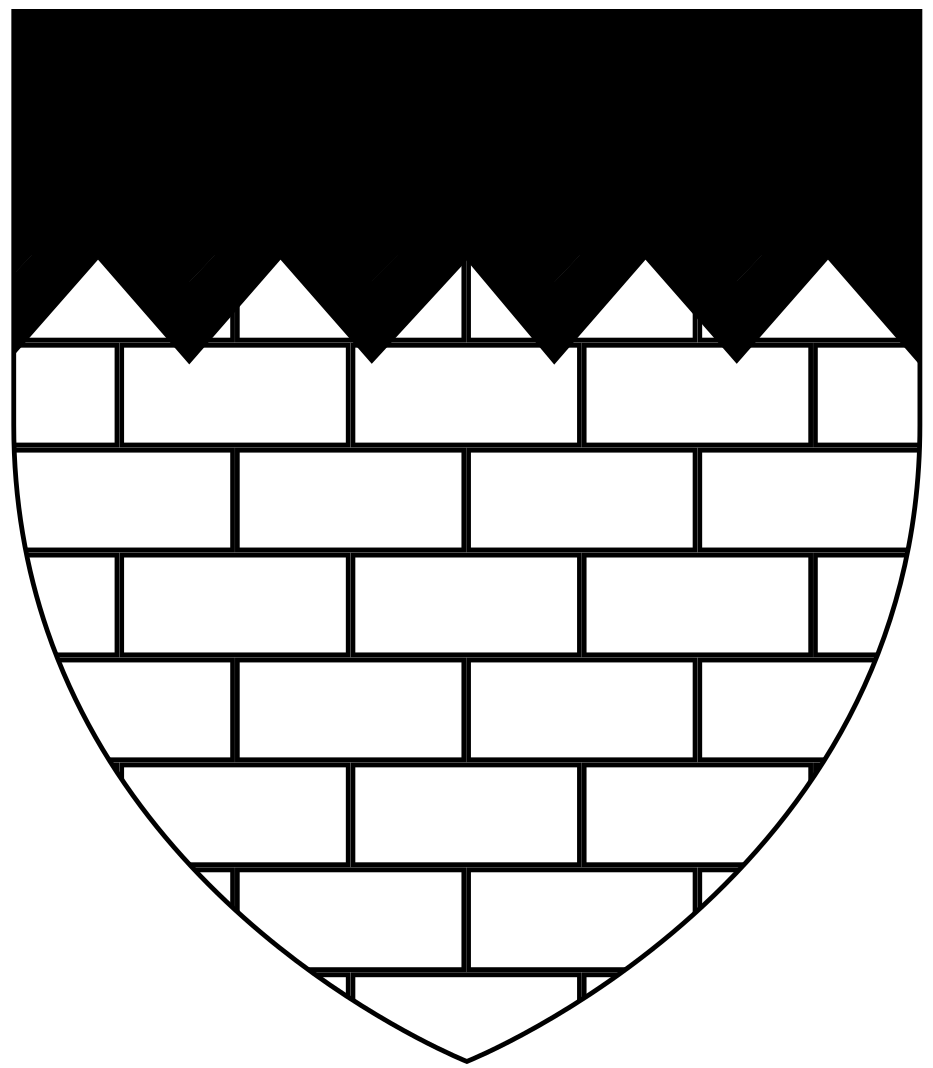
Arms of Reynell: Argent, masonry sable a chief indented of the second

The Reynell surname is an early form of the Reynolds (surname).

== Coat of arms ==
The coat of arms for the Reynell family is described as:

Reynells of Ogwell

ARMS - Masonry argent and sable, a chief indented of the second.
CREST - A fox passant or, being the crest of Strighall.
MOTTOES - Murus aheneus esto, and Indubitata Fides.
SUPPORTERS - As anciently borne, two foxes.

== History ==
Sources include Rev. John Prince's The Worthies of Devon (1697?), and John Lambrick Vivian (editor), The Visitations of the Heralds to the County of Devon (1895). Prince described the Reynell family as being 'descended from a very antient stock, transplanted hither from the county of Cambridge... above three hundred years since; where it still flourishes in worshipful degree'. The Heralds Visitations of 1620 traced earlier generations of the family and described the first of this distinguished line as 'Richard Reinell who had the custody of the Castles of Exeter (built by Baldwin de Redvers) and Launceston... 1191, Sheriff of Devon 1191-94'

Between the reigns of King John and Henry V, the Reynells 'were ever men of great credit, fidelity, and service, to their Kings, country and state as well in peace matters as wars' They had great 'revenues, offices, lordships and lands, in sundry shires' including Somerset, Cambridgeshire and Yorkshire, but their greatest possessions were in Devon and Cornwall.

By the end of this period these included Malston (Old and New), Netherton, Frogmere, East Ogwell, Butterley, Sandhulk, Ellacombe, Crews-Morchard, Upton, Hidswell, Nootcombe, East and West Thwangley, Nassey, East-Raddon, Colebrook, Trebarch, Trebligha, Hyerland, Watringdon, Overcombe, Upbutterley, Nethercombe, Carpenters Fosse, Cottesbury, Ley, South-Downs, Shernewicke, Pittes, Eastabrook, Snedon, Penmalth, Overhosdon, Polhele, Tremollow, Wiero, St. Germans, Bodmin and lands in other villages and in Plymouth.

Some Reynells were with Henry V at the winning of Harfleur (a port later replaced by Le Havre) and Agincourt in 1415, some were keepers of the Castle at Calais, one of the Cinque Ports, some were 'knights of this shire in Parliament' and some served 'their Kings with a band of their own men at arms'. One Reynell was secretary to Henry VI and travelled with him to conclude a peace with France. The most consistent association of the family was with the law, 'sitting with the judges of the kingdom, in taking assizes, and determining grievous enormities', and it is to this tradition that Richard Reynell (d.1585) belonged, being a commissioner of the peace for nearly forty years.

O'Hagan, Mary (1990). A History of Forde House. Teignbridge District Council. pp. 19–49.

== People ==
People whose family name is or was Reynell include:

- Gladys Reynell (1881–1956), Australian potter
- John Reynell (1809–1873), South Australian winemaker
- Richard Reynell (disambiguation), multiple people
- Thomas Reynell (disambiguation), multiple people
