= The Borderlands (2013 film) =

- Theatrical poster
- Directed by: Elliot Goldner
- Written by: Elliot Goldner
- Produced by: Jennifer Handorf; Jezz Vernon
- Starring: Gordon Kennedy; Aidan McArdle; Robin Hill; Luke Neal; Patrick Godfrey
- Cinematography: Eben Bolter
- Edited by: Will Gilbey; Jacob Proctor; Mark Towns
- Production company: Metrodome Distribution
- Release date: 24 August 2013 (FrightFest)
- Running time: 89 minutes
- Country: United Kingdom
- Language: English

The Borderlands, released in the United States as Final Prayer, is a 2013 British found-footage horror film written and directed by Elliot Goldner, in his directorial debut. It had its world premiere on 24 August 2013 at the London FrightFest Film Festival and centers upon a group of Vatican investigators researching an old church rumored to be the site of a miracle.

== Plot ==
The Vatican sends three men to investigate reports of supernatural activity in a recently reopened 13th-century church in the Devon countryside. The group consists of skeptical religious brother Deacon, layman and technology expert Gray Parker, and the stringent Father Mark Amidon.

Upon their arrival, Gray sets up the recording equipment. Local priest Father Crellick tells them a miracle has taken place. He shows them captured footage of objects on the altar mysteriously moving. That night, local youths burn a sheep to death outside the men's cottage. The next day, Mark discovers a hidden side panel in the church, but he is disturbed by an unseen force before he can enter. Mark's ear starts bleeding, which he attributes to a ruptured eardrum caused by air pressure changes.

A multi-mic radio setup detects the sound of deep growls and whispers, followed by an infant's cry. While tracing the source of these sounds, Deacon sees Crellick pass by a window. Mark pursues a despondent Crellick up the bell tower. Crellick questions whether he has witnessed a miracle or something far worse, then leaps to his death before a horrified Mark. Mark insists on closing the investigation, citing that no concrete evidence of supernatural activity has been found.

Deacon and Gray visit the local pub and are met with hostility fueled by Crellick's passing. Overhearing them discussing local folklore and their investigation, the pub owner evicts them from his premises. Deacon leaves the pub and goes to investigate the church on his own. He traces whispers and creaks to a hidden door, inscribed with a pagan sigil he has seen in the diaries of the last minister to serve at the church until it was closed in the 1880s. Behind the door, a set of stairs leads down into darkness and Deacon is assailed by the sounds of a baby crying and Crellick screaming.

Without consulting Mark, Deacon requests his elderly mentor from the Vatican, exorcist Father Calvino, to urgently visit and purify the church grounds. Calvino explains that during the founding of Christianity in England, priests built churches upon the sites of pagan temples. He has evidence that the church is situated on a site – still visible in aerial photographs – of human sacrifices to an unnamed pagan deity. That night, during the exorcism, violent and invisible forces shake the church. Mark is apparently killed and Calvino's eyes bleed, then the two men mysteriously vanish. Deacon traces distant cries to the hidden staircase.

As Gray and Deacon descend into a subterranean labyrinth, they find evidence of child sacrifice and realize that the former minister had converted to worshipping the pagan deity. They spot Mark, who walks into the darkness heedless of their calls. The pair find Calvino's ornamental crucifix on the floor of one of the tunnels. Following the sound of Mark's voice, they crawl through a narrow, foul-smelling passageway whose exits suddenly contract via a membranous material before the tunnel itself begins to move, revealing it to be part of the digestive system of a living organism. The walls start to secrete powerful enzymes that begin to dissolve the two men. As their lights go out, Gray screams in agony and terror, while a tormented Deacon recites the Lord's Prayer.

== Cast ==
- Gordon Kennedy as Brother Deacon
- Robin Hill as Gray Parker
- Aidan McArdle as Father Mark Amidon
- Patrick Godfrey as Father Calvino
- Luke Neal as Father Crellick

== Production ==
The Borderlands was the first feature in a production slate launched by the Metrodome Group through its production arm Cinedome. Metrodome approached Goldner to develop a low-budget horror film. Executive producer Jezz Vernon had been inspired by Brent Tor on Dartmoor, and the initial brief called for a haunted church, investigators and a found-footage format. Goldner developed the idea of a Vatican team investigating alleged miracles from that premise.

Brent Tor was considered as a filming location, but the church was too small for the production. Producer Jennifer Handorf scouted between 15 and 20 churches before West Ogwell Church in Devon was selected.

The found-footage format was part of the project from the initial brief. The characters used head-mounted cameras rather than handheld ones; Handorf said that this complicated the editing because there was no conventional master shot, requiring shots and camera movements to be planned during filming. Several scenes between Gordon Kennedy and Robin Hill were improvised. Their comic rapport led to additional material being shot, including the pub scene, to make the change in tone later in the film less abrupt.

== Reception ==
On Rotten Tomatoes, the film holds an approval rating of 83% based on 18 reviews.

Peter Bradshaw of The Guardian gave the film four out of five stars, highlighting the performances of Gordon Kennedy and Robin Hill and the use of the church location. Mark Kermode, writing in The Observer, gave it three out of five stars. He regarded much of the set-up as familiar, but singled out the interplay between Hill and Kennedy and the ending. Geoffrey Macnab of The Independent also awarded three out of five stars, noting the film's humour, West Country setting and Kennedy's performance.

Tom Huddleston of Time Out gave the film three out of five stars. He responded positively to the script, cast and ending, though he found some of the scares repetitive and the basic approach familiar. Stephen Dalton of The Hollywood Reporter found the film atmospheric but thought its scares did not fully deliver on the build-up.
