= Henry Verney, 18th Baron Willoughby de Broke =

British peer (1844–1902)

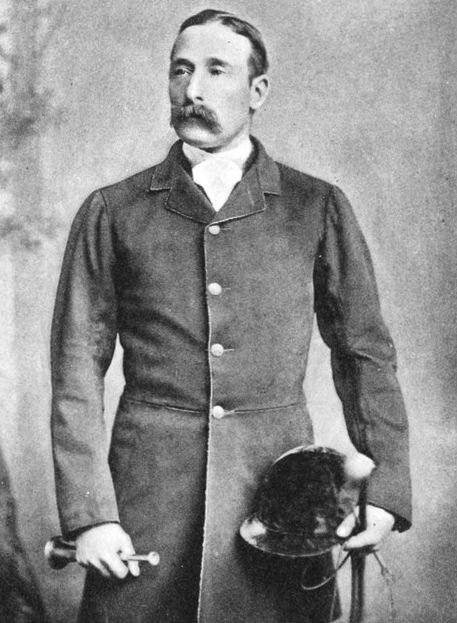
Henry Verney, 18th Baron Willoughby de Broke, Master of the Warwickshire Foxhounds from 1876

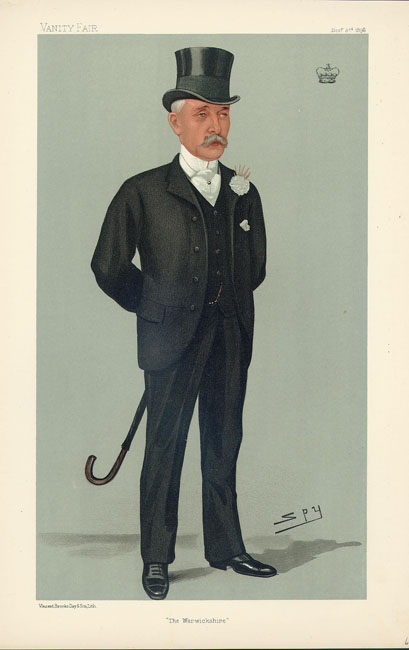
"The Warwickshire". Caricature by Spy published in Vanity Fair in 1896.

Colonel Henry Verney, 18th Baron Willoughby de Broke and de jure 26th Baron Latimer (14 May 1844 – 19 December 1902) of Compton Verney in Warwickshire, was a British peer.

== Origins ==
He was born Henry Barnard at Kineton, next to Compton Verney, Warwickshire, on 14 May 1844 and was baptised on 13 July 1844, the son of Robert John Barnard (1809-1862) by his wife Georgina Jane Taylor, a daughter of Major-General Thomas Taylor of Ogwell House, West Ogwell in Devon, Lieutenant Governor of the Royal Military College, Sandhurst and a courtier to King William IV. Following his father's inheritance in 1852 from his childless maternal uncle of the title (17th) Baron Willoughby de Broke, in accordance with the accompanying bequest of the Verney estates, in 1853 he adopted the surname Verney in lieu of his patronymic.

== Career ==
Henry Verney inherited the title 18th Baron Willoughby de Broke and 26th Baron Latimer on the death of his father in 1862. He was educated at Eton and Christ Church, Oxford. He was Colonel commanding the Warwickshire Yeomanry, a Deputy Lieutenant and a Justice of the Peace for Warwickshire.

=== Fox hunting career ===
From 1876 he was a notable Master of Foxhounds of the Warwickshire Hunt (the kennels of which were at Kineton adjoining Compton Verney), which office had also been exercised by his father between 1839 and 1856. Having not been in good health for a considerable time, he retired as Master in early 1900 to be replaced by his eldest son. It was said "he was very popular with the farmers and in every respect a thoroughly capable master; he knew how to breed hounds and how to hunt them, and his word was law in the hunting-field."

He was the author of "Advice on Fox-Hunting", published in 1906, with a preface by his son the 19th Baron, also a notable author on foxhunting.

== Marriage and issue ==
On 17 October 1867 he married Geraldine Smith-Barry (d.1894), a daughter of James Hugh Smith-Barry (1816-1856) of Marbury Hall in Cheshire and of Fota Island, County Cork, Ireland, High Sheriff of County Cork, a Deputy Lieutenant and High Sheriff of Cheshire, son of John Smith Barry, illegitimate son of James Hugh Smith Barry (died 1837), son of The Hon. John Smith Barry, younger son of James Barry, 4th Earl of Barrymore. Her brother was Arthur Smith-Barry, 1st Baron Barrymore. By his wife he had five children:

- Richard Verney, 19th Baron Willoughby de Broke (1869-1923), eldest son and heir; who married Marie Frances Lisette Hanbury, and had issue
- Hon. Henry Peyto Verney, who died before his father.
- Hon. Blanche Verney (b.1872); who married in 1898 Michael Granville Lloyd Baker, and had issue.
- Hon. Patience Verney (24 Aug 1873 - 27 or 29 April 1965); who married on 4 Jun 1896 at Holy Trinity Church, Chelsea, Kensington to Basil Hanbury (b. 7 October 1862), and had issue.
- Hon. Katherine Verney (b. abt 1876, d. before her father)

== Death and succession ==
Lord Willoughby de Broke died on board the steamship Australia, and was buried at sea near Colombo on 19 December 1902. A memorial service was held on 29 December 1902 at Kineton, Warwickshire. On his death, his title passed to his eldest son Richard Verney, 19th Baron Willoughby de Broke.

Peerage of England
Preceded by Robert John Verney	Baron Willoughby de Broke; 1862–1902	Succeeded by Richard Greville Verney
