= Sir Richard Reynell, 1st Baronet =

English-born judge (1626–1699)

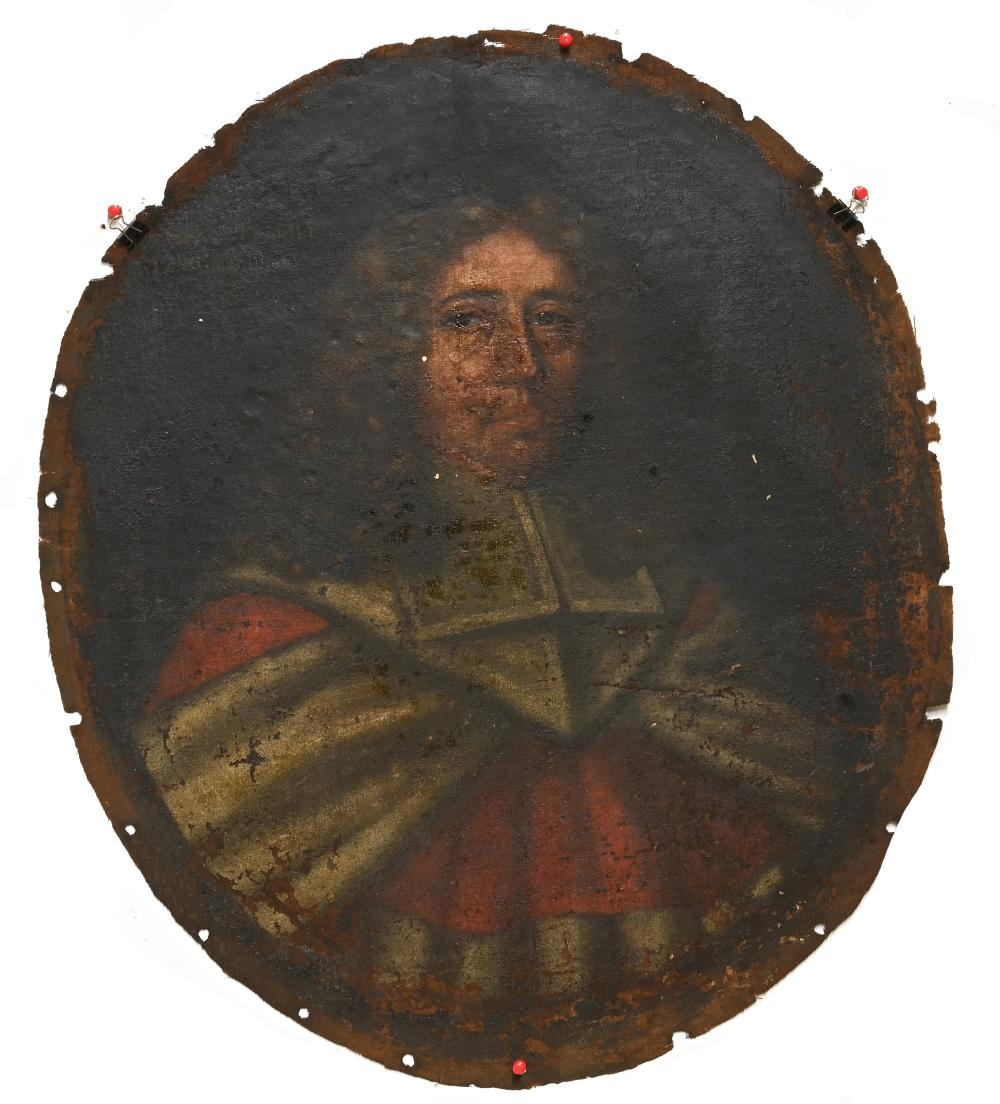
- Born: 1625
- Died: 18 October 1699
- Occupations: Judge, politician
- Children: Sir Richard Reynell, 2nd Baronet
- Father: Richard Reynell
- Relatives: Thomas Reynell

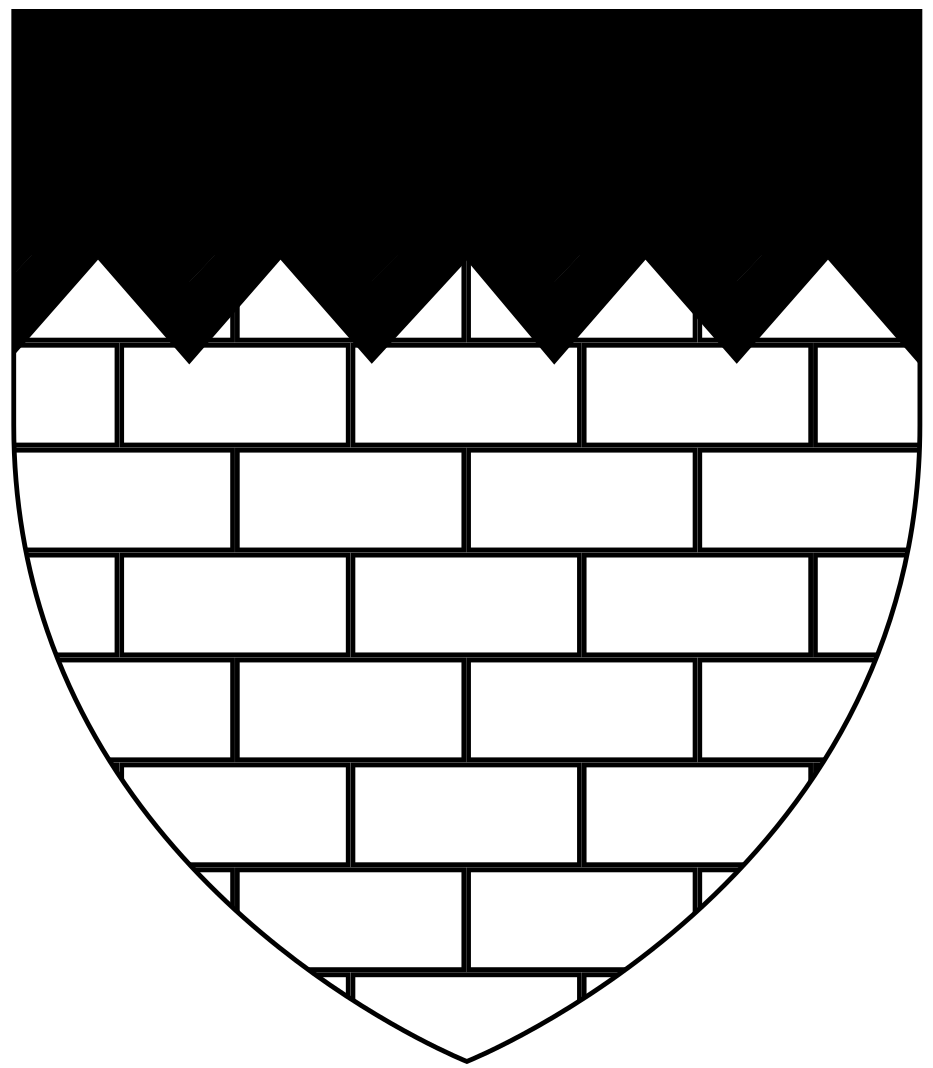
Arms of Reynell: Argent, masonry sable a chief indented of the second

Sir Richard Reynell, 1st Baronet (1626 – 18 October 1699), was an English-born judge who had a distinguished career in Ireland and held office as Lord Chief Justice of the King's Bench in Ireland. He was the first of the Reynell baronets of Laleham.

== Background and early career ==
He was born in Devonshire, second son of Sir Richard Reynell (1583–1648) of East Ogwell and his wife (and cousin) Mary Reynell, daughter of Richard Reynell of Creedy Widger, near Crediton, and Mary Peryam. The Reynells were an ancient West Country family, who were descended from Sir Richard Reynell, a prominent Crown servant who lived in Somerset in the time of Richard I. The judge was the great-grandson of Richard Reynell, High Sheriff of Devon 1584–5, and the younger brother of the politician Sir Thomas Reynell (1625–1698).

Reynell entered Middle Temple in 1642 and was called to the Bar in 1653. He decided to pursue a legal career in Ireland and was admitted to the King's Inn in 1658. He built up a large practice and was noted for his willingness to take Roman Catholic clients, which was to cause him some trouble later. He married into a Dublin family and bought property in the city. He was elected to the Irish House of Commons in the sole Irish Parliament of the reign of Charles II as member for Athboy in 1661. He acted as a judge of assize in 1670, and was made Second Sergeant and knighted in 1673. He enjoyed the friendship of Arthur Capel, 1st Earl of Essex, the Lord Lieutenant of Ireland.

== Judge ==
On Essex's recommendation, Reynell was made a judge of the Court of King's Bench (Ireland) in 1674. Essex praised him as one of the two best judges in Ireland. On the return of James Butler, 1st Duke of Ormonde to the Lord Lieutenancy in 1677, Essex before departing for England recommended Reynell to him as one of the few Irish judges who was a man of learning and was neither too old nor too frail to perform his duties effectively. Ormonde agreed: and as John Bysse, the Chief Baron of the Irish Exchequer was old and in failing health, the Duke proposed that he should be persuaded to retire and that Reynell should replace him. However, the anti-Catholic hysteria engendered by the Popish Plot was then at its height and Reynell's tolerant attitude to Catholics told against him; nor, despite his aristocratic background, did he have much influence at Whitehall. When Bysse died in 1680 Charles II chose Henry Hene to replace him. Reynell was however made a baronet (which was not a common honour for an Irish judge at the time) in 1678, and a member of the Privy Council of Ireland in 1682.

Despite his alleged Catholic sympathies, he was unacceptable as a judge to King James II, who succeeded his brother in 1685. He was dismissed from the Bench in 1686; some said that the true reason for this was that his wealth and independence of mind had earned him the enmity of the new Lord Deputy, Tyrconnell. With little to keep him in Ireland (his wife had died some years earlier), he returned to England and remained there until after the Glorious Revolution of 1688. He was elected to the post-Revolution Parliament as member for the family borough of Ashburton in 1690, his elder brother Sir Thomas Reynell having stood down as MP to accommodate him. He was active on several committees, especially those which dealt with Irish affairs. Thomas Osborne, 1st Duke of Leeds, the effective leader of the new administration, regarded him as a reliable Government supporter.

== Lord Chief Justice ==
In 1691, having demonstrated his loyalty to the new administration, he received his overdue promotion as Lord Chief Justice of Ireland, but he had a somewhat troubled tenure in that office. While his legal ability was not in dispute, he had made numerous enemies. In politics, he was generally seen as a Tory at a time when the Whigs were the dominant party, and in 1693 he was openly accused of being a Jacobite. In 1692 an anonymous memorandum addressed to the King dealing with the alleged misgovernment of Ireland named Reynell as one of four senior judges who were guilty of numerous acts of injustice, and in particular, were guilty of favouring Irish interests over English. The King did not take this accusation seriously, but Reynell's enemies in England blamed him for the Irish Parliament's failure to ratify the Treaty of Limerick, and more generally for his failure to take any steps towards the peaceful settlement of Ireland. The Dublin government, far better informed on Irish affairs, put most of the blame for the failure to achieve a settlement, and particularly the failure to ratify the Treaty, on John Osborne, the Prime Serjeant, who was dismissed from office in 1692 for gross insubordination.

There was also the old charge that Reynell was excessively tolerant of Catholics, and on this flimsy basis, hysterical accusations were made by a Colonel FitzGerald that he was involved in a conspiracy to kill William III. In December 1693 Reynell spoke in the English House of Commons in his own defence with great eloquence. Influential friends of his like Sir Edward Seymour, one of the leaders of the Tory Party, defended his integrity with vigour, pointing to the absurdity of the idea that Reynell would plot to kill the King to whom he owed everything ("a man would have to be an idiot" to act so, Seymour remarked), and praising him as "an honest and prudent man". Reynell was completely vindicated. It is said that he found the attacks on him so painful that he never attended the House of Commons again. However, he continued to attend meetings of the Privy Council of England.

Reynell was also subject to complaints that he drew an allowance for going on assize, as was customary, but that he did not actually hold sessions in any of the assize towns. Reynell, in his own defence, referred to the double burden of being Lord Chief Justice of Ireland while also having duties to attend to in England.

== Old age and death ==
More substantial than accusations of treason was the claim that he was in failing physical and mental health. As noted, he clearly found the burden of assize work too great to bear. In 1695 Henry Capell, 1st Baron Capell of Tewkesbury, the Lord Justice of Ireland, said that Reynell was on the point of death and "not likely to live a month longer" (in fact he had four more years to live, and was still well enough to occasionally attend Council meetings) and past any sense or minding any business. He was dismissed from the Bench the same year, on the ground of his mental incapacity, although he successfully petitioned for a half years salary of £300. He died in London in 1699. He was given something close to a State funeral: an impressive procession passed through London, and brought his body back to Devonshire for burial at East Ogwell.

== Family ==
Reynell married Hester Beckett, daughter of Randall Beckett of Dublin, in a ceremony at the King's Inn, of which her father was the lessee, in 1660. They had two sons, Richard and Henry, and four daughters, including Elizabeth and Hester. The elder son Richard, succeeded as second baronet. His younger brother Henry (died 1721) practised at the Bar in Dublin. His sister Elizabeth married the politician William Richardson of Legacorry, County Armagh in 1695, but had no issue.

While Sir Richard and Lady (Hester) Reynell were travelling in France in 1682 Hester died at Abbeville; Reynell brought her body home to Devonshire for burial.

His Dublin residence was on Church Street, adjacent to the present Four Courts. He also acquired a house adjacent to the King's Inns, which had been built in the 1630s by Sir Richard Osbaldeston, the Attorney General for Ireland, and later belonged to his son William Osbaldeston, a barrister.

== Reputation ==
Reynell's professional success owed something to his upper-class background: unlike most Irish judges at that time, he could deal with men like Essex and Ormonde as social equals. At the same time, his legal ability was acknowledged even by his critics, though there was probably a falling off of his mental powers in his later years. Ball calls him one of the most remarkable Irish judges of the era.

Legal offices
Preceded by Thomas Nugent	Lord Chief Justice of Ireland; 1690–1695	Succeeded by Sir Richard Pyne
Baronetage of Ireland
New creation	Baronet (of Laleham); 1678–1699	Succeeded by Richard Reynell
