= Thomas Reynell =

Thomas Reynell may refer to:

- Thomas Reynell (MP, died 1698) (1625–1698), English lawyer and politician
- Sir Thomas Reynell (MP, died 1655) (1589–1655), his uncle, English politician
- Sir Thomas Reynell (British Army officer) (1777–1848)
