= Thomas Reynell (British Army officer) =

British Army officer

Lieutenant-General Sir Thomas Reynell Bt KCB
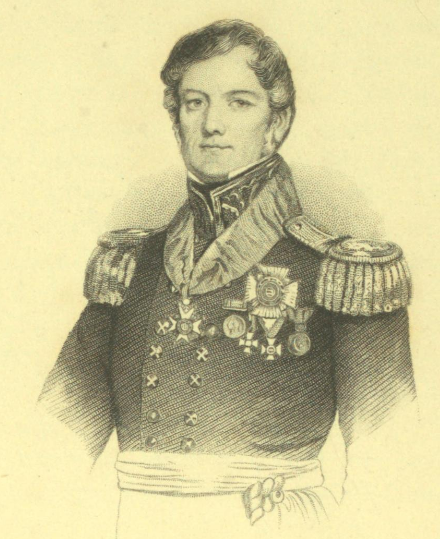
- Engraving of Reynell as colonel of the 71st Foot, by H. Crickmore
- Born: 9 April 1777
- Died: 10 February 1848 (aged 70); Arundel, England
- Spouse: Elizabeth Pack (m. 1831–1848)
- Military career
- Allegiance: United Kingdom
- Branch: British Army
- Service years: 1793–1848
- Rank: Lieutenant-General
- Commands: 71st Regiment of Foot; 3rd (Light) Brigade; Meerut Division
- Conflicts: French Revolutionary Wars; Flanders Campaign; Battle of Lincelles; Siege of Nijmegen; West Indies Campaign; Invasion of Trinidad; Haitian Revolution; Anglo-Russian Invasion of Holland; Battle of Krabbendam; Battle of Bergen; Battle of Alkmaar; Battle of Castricum; Egypt Campaign; Battle of Abukir; Battle of Mandora; Battle of Alexandria; Siege of Cairo; Siege of Alexandria; Napoleonic Wars; Peninsular War; Battle of Sobral; Battle of Redinha; Hundred Days; Battle of Waterloo (WIA); Siege of Bharatpur
- Awards: Military Order of Maria Theresa (Austria); Order of St. George (Russia)

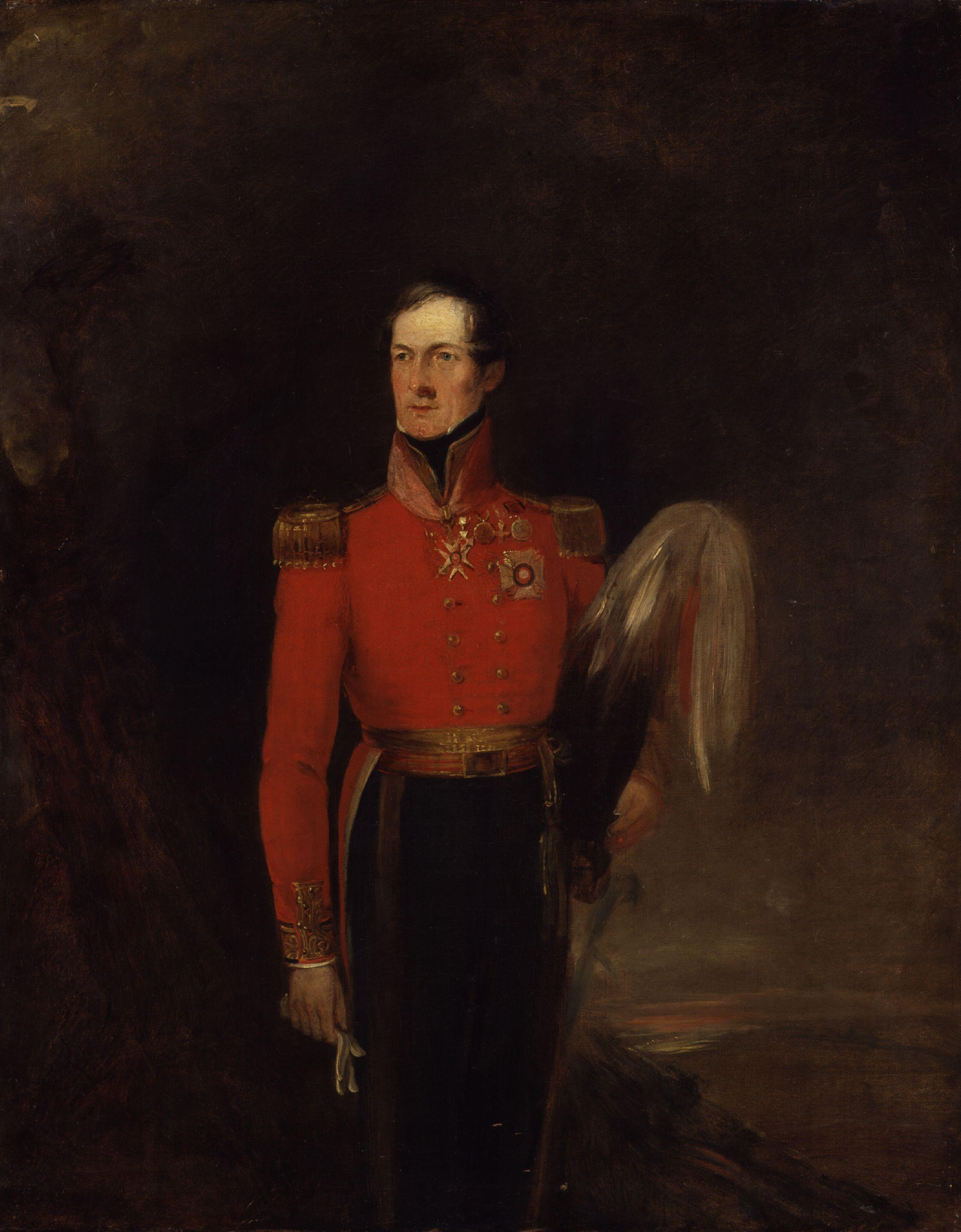
Sir Thomas Reynell, 6th Bt by William Salter

Sir Thomas Reynell, 6th Baronet, KCB (1777–1848) was a 19th-century British Army officer. He was Colonel in Chief of the 71st Highlanders Regiment from 1841 to 1848.

== Life ==
Thomas Reynell was descended from the Reynell baronets of Laleham on the River Thames. The Reynell family had been settled in Devon for centuries and were mainly associated with East Ogwell, although the first two Baronets also had strong links with Ireland.

Reynell was born on April 9, 1777, the son of Lieutenant Thomas Reynell (1746–1777), an officer on active duty with the 62nd Regiment of Foot, and Anne Carty of Kinsale. The elder Reynell participated in the Canadian Campaign under command of Lt. Col John Anstruther. He died from a gunshot to the head at the Battle of Freeman's Farm near Saratoga on 19 September 1777, a few months after the younger Reynell's birth. Anne Carty, young Thomas, and his siblings were then taken as a prisoner of war along with various captured troops. The Continental Congress of November 1778 authorised their release, but this did not occur until May 1779 by which time Reynell was two years old.

Over ten years later, an older Reynell decided on a military career and joined the newly created 38th Regiment of Foot as an ensign in 1793 shortly after his 16th birthday. This was during the start of the French Revolutionary Wars. It is not clear if he served in Ireland, but he sailed to the West Indies and was present at the capture of Trinidad in 1797.

Following Napoleon's escape and return to power, Reynell's regiment was shipped to Ostend in April 1815. After the British search for the French army south of Brussels, they finally met in the farm fields south of the tiny village of Waterloo. The subsequent Battle of Waterloo resulted in the true final defeat of Napoleon. Reynell, by then a Lieutenant Colonel, was one of the thousands of men who were wounded in this battle.

Given lighter work, he did not go with his regiment to Canada but instead in 1825 returned to India in command of the 1st Infantry Division. This placed him at the Siege of Bhurtpore, which took place from December 1825 to January 1826.

In 1829, Reynell became Baronet of Laleham in Surrey following the death of his older brother Richard Littleton Reynell (b.1772), 5th baronet, who had obtained the baronetcy through an uncle in 1798.

In 1841 he succeeded Lt. Gen Samuel Ford Whittingham as Colonel-in-Chief of the 71st Highlanders Regiment following Whittingham's death.

He died on 10 February 1848 at Arundel in Sussex and is buried under a granite monument in the churchyard of St Mary's in Walberton. His will is held in the National Archive at Kew.

== Family ==
In 1831 (aged 54) he married Lady Elizabeth Louisa Pack (1783–1856), widow of Sir Denis Pack, with whom he had served in the Peninsular War. He had written to Pack from 1810 to 1823.

The couple was too old to have children. Reynell died childless and the baronetcy died with him.

== Artistic recognition ==
His portrait was painted by William Salter in around 1830. It is held by the National Portrait Gallery, London.

Baronetage of Ireland
Preceded by Richard Reynell	Baronet (of Laleham); 1829–1848	Extinct
