= Robert Verney, 17th Baron Willoughby de Broke =

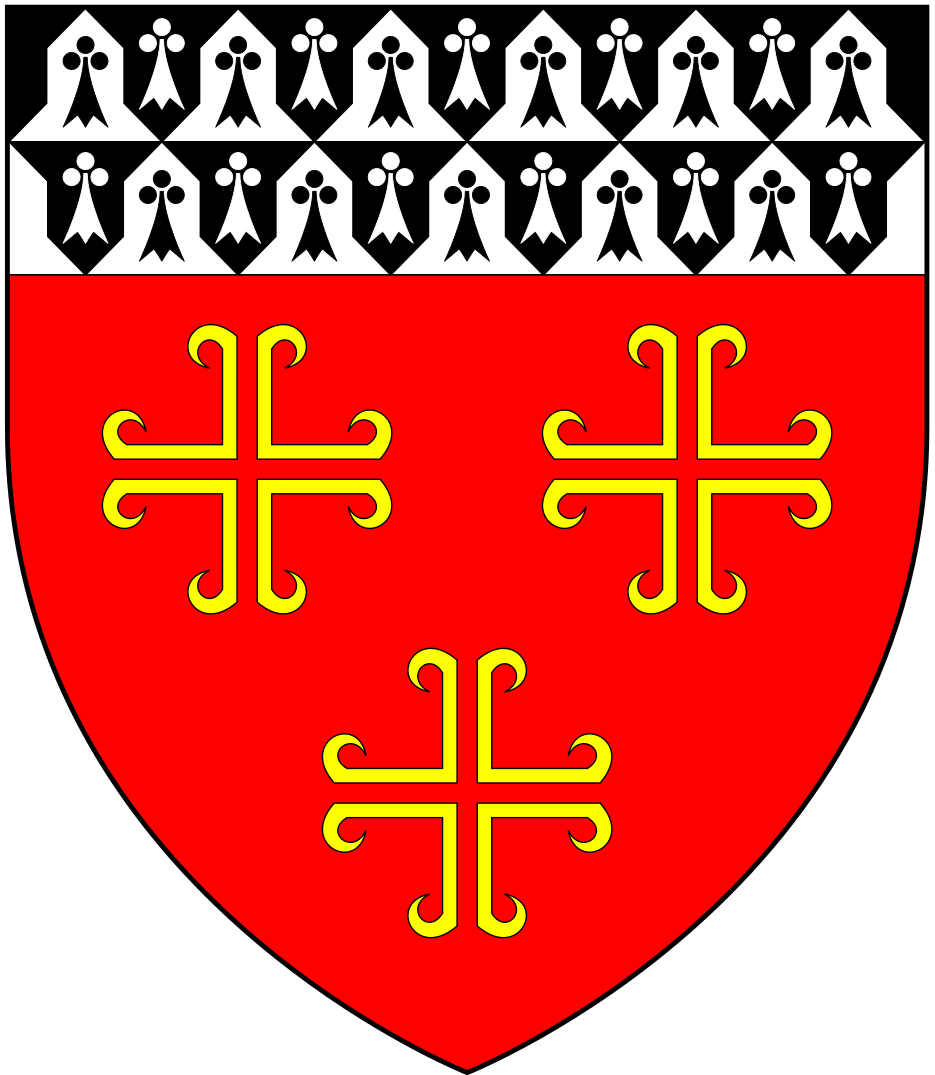
Arms of Verney: Gules, three crosses recerclée or a chief vair ermine and ermines, adopted in 1853 by the 17th Baron in lieu of his paternal arms of Barnard

Robert John Verney, 17th Baron Willoughby de Broke and de jure 25th Baron Latimer (7 October 1809 – 5 June 1862) (born Barnard) of Compton Verney in Warwickshire, was a peer in the peerage of England.

== Origins ==
Canting arms of Barnard: Quarterly argent and gules, a bear sejant sable

He was born Robert John Barnard on 7 October 1809, the eldest son of Reverend Robert Barnard (1760–1834), Prebendary of Winchester, Rector of Lighthorne, Warwickshire, for 47 years, Vicar of Witney, Oxfordshire, 2nd son of Rev. Thomas Barnard (1720-1781) (son of Rev. Thomas Barnard, headmaster of Leeds Grammar School), Rector of Withersfield in Suffolk and of Newmarket St Mary and Chaplain-in-Ordinary (or "Chaplain-in-Waiting") to King George III in 1762. His mother was Hon. Louisa Verney (1769-1835), daughter of John Peyto-Verney, 14th Baron Willoughby de Broke of Compton Verney. Lighthorn was a manor held by the Verney family since 1667, and Lighthorn Church, rebuilt by the 14th Baron in 1772, contains their family burial vault. Reverend Robert Barnard's mural monument survives in Lighthorn Church, also inscribed to his widow Hon. Louisa Verney. The arms of Barnard (according to Burke) were: Argent, a bear rampant sable muzzled or, today quartered by Lord Willoughby de Broke as Quarterly argent and gules, a bear sejant sable.

== Career ==
In 1852 he inherited the titles 17th Baron Willoughby de Broke and 25th Baron Latimer on the death of his uncle Henry Peyto-Verney, 16th Baron Willoughby de Broke (d.1852) and in 1853 was obliged to change his surname name to his maternal name of Verney as a condition of inheriting the Verney estates.

== Marriage and children ==
On 25 October 1842, he married Georgiana Jane Taylor (b. in Dublin abt. 1824, d.1889), a daughter of Maj-Gen Thomas William Taylor (1782-1854), CB, of Ogwell House, West Ogwell in Devon, an officer of the Honourable East India Company at Madras, and later Lt-Gov of the Royal Military College, Sandhurst and a Groom of the Bedchamber to King William IV. Their children included:

- Henry Barnard alias Verney (b.1844)
- Walter Robert Barnard alias Verney (b.1846)
- Margaret Louisa Barnard alias Verney (b.1847)
- Alice Jane Barnard alias Verney (b.1849)
- Robert Reynell Barnard alias Verney (1850-1872)
- Susan Emma Verney (1852 - 21 April 1941), married on 11 June 1885 to Edmund Temple Godman (14 June 1844 - 11 June 1885). Their son was Lt. Col. John Godman (9 May 1886 - 1978).
- Mabel Verney (1855 - 17 May 1937)

His sister-in-law Ann Frances Taylor married Sir Walter Palk Carew, 8th Baronet (1807–1874) of Haccombe in Devon.

== Death and succession ==
He died on 5 June 1862 and was buried in the Verney vault in Lighthorne Church, Warwickshire, established by the 14th Baron. He was succeeded in the titles by his son Col. Henry Verney, 18th Baron Willoughby de Broke.

Peerage of England
| Preceded by Henry Peyto-Verney | Baron Willoughby de Broke; 1852–1862 | Succeeded by Henry Verney |
