= West Ogwell Church =

Church in Devon, England

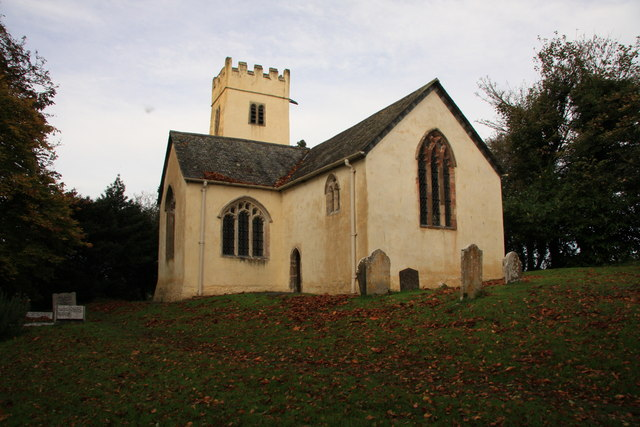

- Location within Devon
- 50°31′07″N 3°40′03″W
- Location: Ogwell, Devon, England

History
- Built: 13th century

Listed Building – Grade I
- Official name: West Ogwell Church
- Designated: 23 August 1955
- Reference no.: 1334475

West Ogwell Church in Ogwell, Devon, England was built in the 13th century. It is recorded in the National Heritage List for England as a designated Grade I listed building, and is now a redundant church in the care of the Churches Conservation Trust. It was declared redundant on 1 June 1981, and was vested in the Trust on 27 October 1982.

The chancel and nave were built around 1300. The two stage west tower, with its battlemented parapet, was added around 1400.

The interior includes a 13th-century sedilia and a Jacobean pulpit. The other features including the box pews, tower screen and curved communion rails are late Georgian.

The church featured in "The Sabbatical", the 1981 debut episode of the BBC’s supernatural anthology series West Country Tales. It was also used for filming of the 2013 British horror film The Borderlands.

== See also ==
- List of churches preserved by the Churches Conservation Trust in South West England
