= Thomas William Taylor (British Army officer) =

Major-General Thomas William Taylor CB
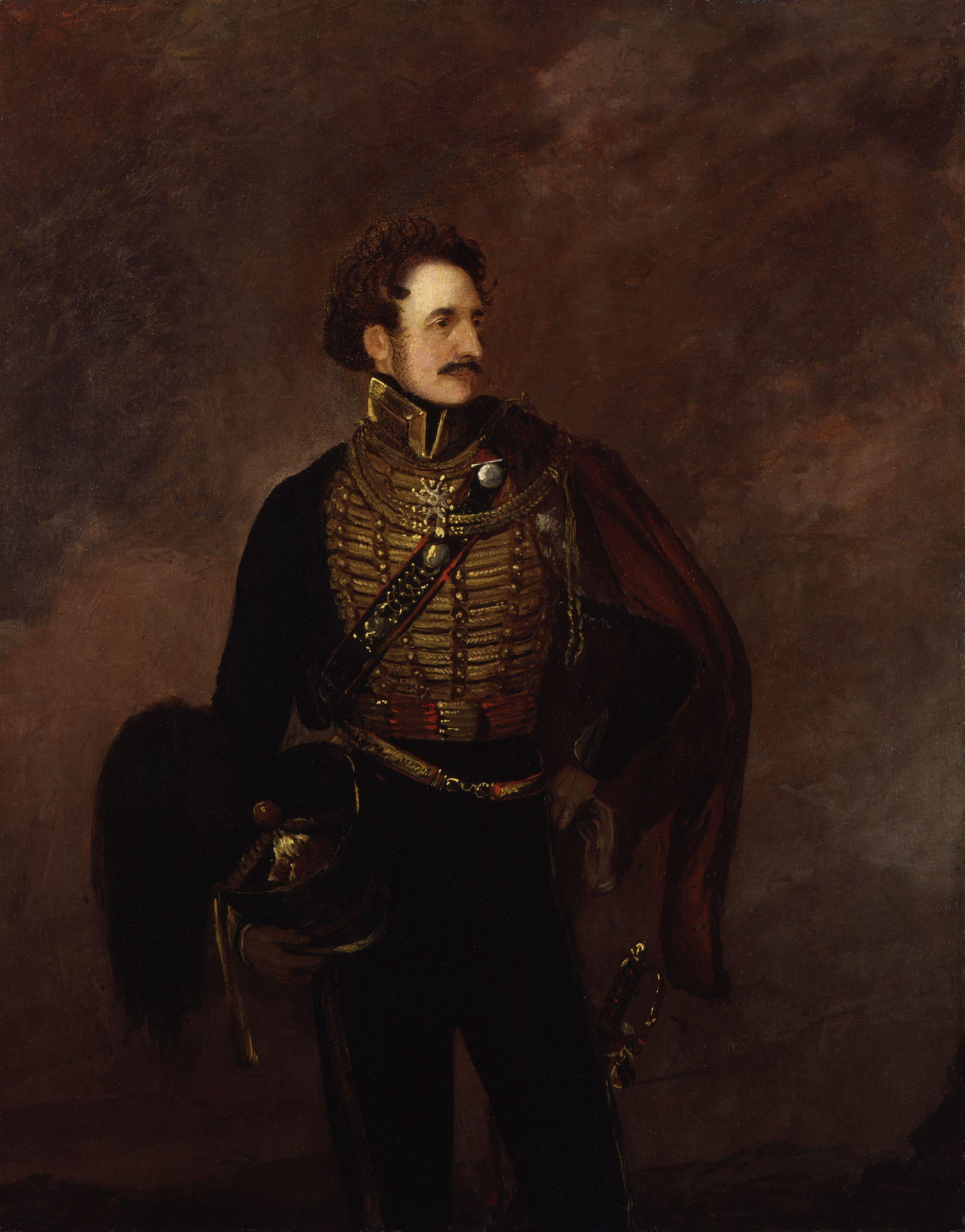
- Portrait by William Salter
- Born: 13 July 1782
- Died: 8 January 1854 (aged 71)
- Military career
- Allegiance: United Kingdom
- Branch: British Army
- Rank: Major-General
- Conflicts: Napoleonic Wars
- Awards: Companion of the Order of the Bath

Major-General Thomas William Taylor CB (13 July 1782 – 8 January 1854) of Ogwell House, West Ogwell, in Devon, was a British Army officer who became Lieutenant-Governor of the Royal Military College, Sandhurst.

== Military career ==
He was educated at Eton College and St John's College, Cambridge and in 1804 was commissioned as a cornet in the 6th Dragoon Guards. He was promoted to captain in 1807 and transferred to the 24th Light Dragoons and then became military secretary to Lord Minto, Governor-General of India. He fought with the 10th Hussars at the Battle of Waterloo in 1815. After the defeat of Napoleon he served at the Headquarters of the Allied Army of Occupation in Paris. In 1826 he became Superintendent of the Cavalry Riding Establishment at St John's Wood Barracks, London, and in 1828 was appointed Inspector of Yeomanry. In 1837 he became Lieutenant-Governor of the Royal Military College, Sandhurst.

He served as a Groom of the Bedchamber to King William IV from 1832 to the accession of Queen Victoria in 1837 and as Colonel of the 17th Lancers from 1852 to his death.

== Marriage and issue ==
On 14 January 1810 at St. George's Church in Madras, India, he married Anne Harvey Petrie, a daughter of John Petrie, by whom he had issue:

- Pierce Gilbert Edward Taylor (1810–1890), Bengal Civil Service.
- Arthur Joseph Taylor (1812–1873), a Captain in the Royal Horse Artillery.
- Fitzwilliam John Taylor (b. 1817), rector of West Ogwell and Rattery
- Reynell George Taylor (b. 1822), of the Bengal Cavalry
- Anne Frances Taylor (d. 1861) wife of Sir Walter Palk Carew, 8th Baronet (1807–1874) of Haccombe in Devon, whose funerary hatchment survives in Haccombe Church showing the arms of Carew impaling Taylor (Sable, a lion passant argent a label of three points azure) where they are also shown in a stained glass window dedicated to Anne Frances Taylor.
- Harriet Maria Taylor, wife of W. B. Fortescue, of Fallapit, Devonshire
- Georgiana Jane Taylor (d. 1889), wife of Robert Verney, 17th Baron Willoughby de Broke (1809–1862) of Compton Verney in Warwickshire.
- Amelia Mary Taylor, wife of William Morris, who fought in the Charge of the Light Brigade.
- Eliza Charlotte Sleech Taylor

== Death ==
He died on 8 January 1854 and was buried at St Mary the Virgin Churchyard in Denbury in Devon.
