= Sir Richard Reynell, 2nd Baronet =

Anglo-Irish politician, barrister and landowner

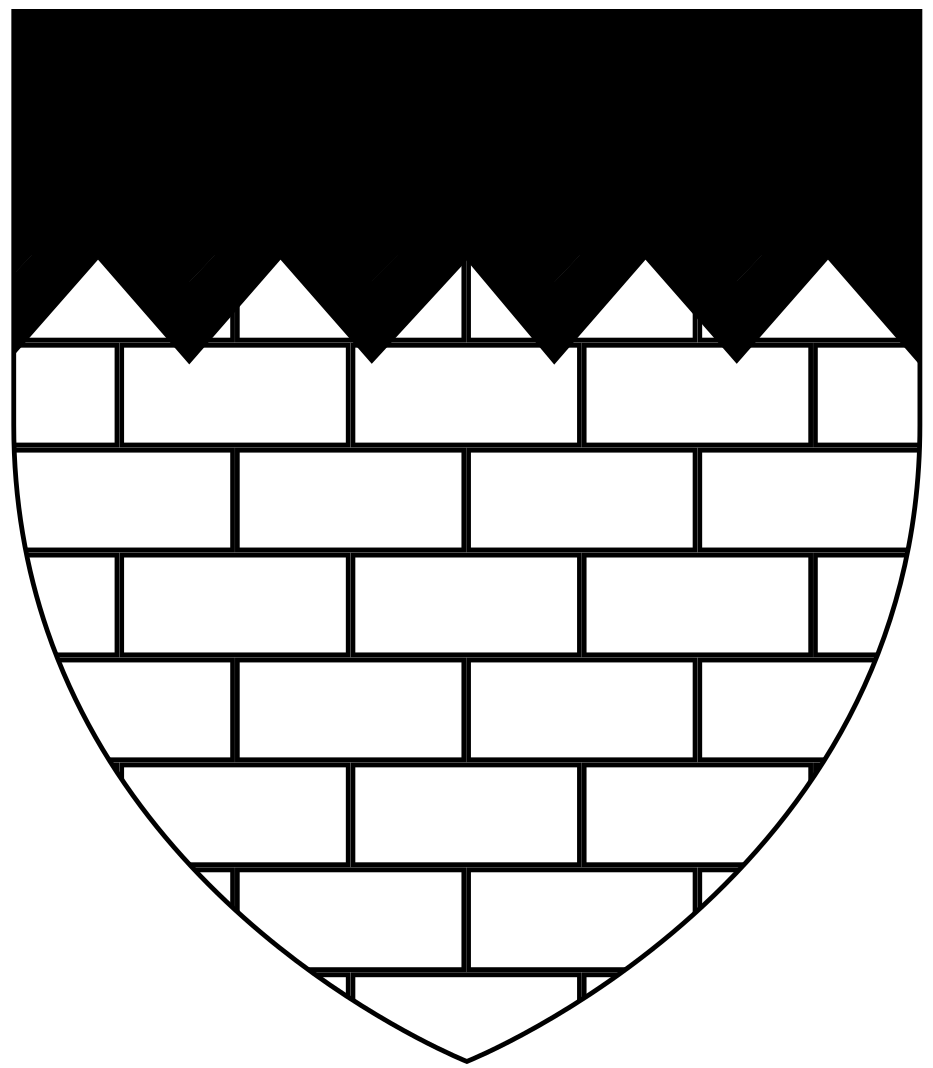
Arms of Reynell: Argent, masonry sable a chief indented of the second

Sir Richard Reynell, 2nd Baronet (1673–1723) was an Anglo-Irish politician, barrister and landowner who sat in the Irish House of Commons as member for the borough of Wicklow from 1692 to 1693.

He was the elder son of Sir Richard Reynell, 1st Baronet and his wife Hester Beckett, daughter of Randall Beckett of Dublin. He was probably born in Dublin, where his father spent most of his career. The elder Sir Richard was in turn member of the House of Commons for Athboy, judge of the Court of King's Bench (Ireland) and finally Lord Chief Justice of Ireland. The Reynells were an ancient Devon family with strong links to East Ogwell and Ashburton, Devon; after the Glorious Revolution the elder Sir Richard sat in the House of Commons of England for Ashburton. The younger Richard was elected to the Irish House of Commons for Wicklow in 1692, when he was barely 20 years old; he was also like his father a practising barrister. His father's mental health failed: he was removed from office in 1695 and retired to England; from then on the family largely severed their ties with Ireland, apart from the second baronet's younger brother Henry, a barrister in Dublin.

The younger Richard married his cousin Elizabeth, daughter of Thomas Reynell of Laleham, Middlesex and Anne Balam. Elizabeth died in 1706, aged thirty-nine. They had three daughters, Hester Reynell who married Christopher Carleton, Anne Jemima who married firstly Lt. Richard Bray and then secondly Captain Abraham Dumaresq, and Catherine who married William Harvest, and one son Sir Thomas Reynell, 3rd Baronet.

Sir Richard Reynell, the 2nd Baronet, died at Laleham in June 1723. In contrast to his father, who was described as one of the most remarkable figures in Irish political life of his time, the second Sir Richard has left little mark on history.

Baronetage of Ireland
Preceded by Richard Reynell	Baronet (of Laleham); 1699–1723	Succeeded by Thomas Reynell
