= Reynell baronets =

Extinct baronetcy in the Baronetage of Ireland

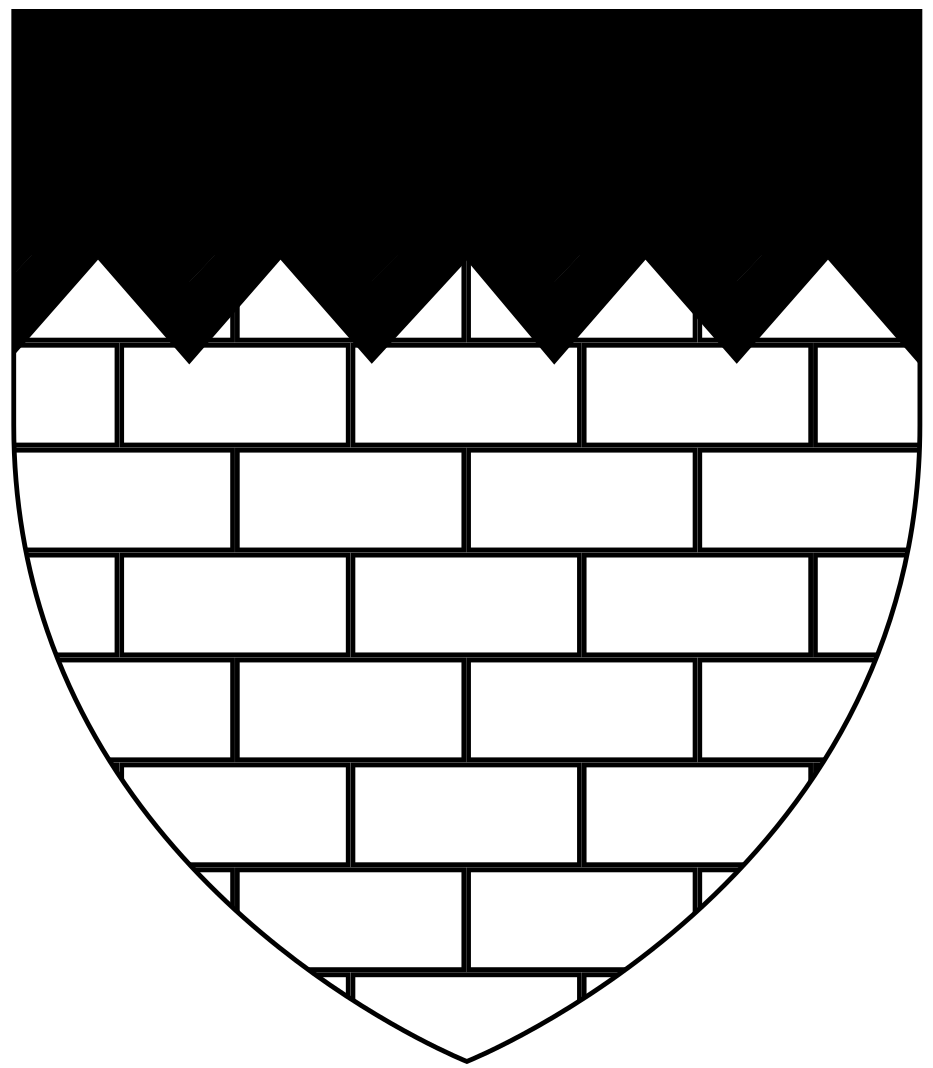
Arms of Reynell: Argent, masonry sable a chief indented of the second

The Reynell Baronetcy, of Laleham in the County of Middlesex, was a title in the Baronetage of Ireland. It was created on 27 July 1678 for Richard Reynell, subsequently Member of Parliament for Ashburton in Devon, and Lord Chief Justice of the King's Bench in Ireland 1691–1695. The 2nd Baronet, his son, represented the borough of Wicklow in the Irish House of Commons, but in contrast to his father had a generally undistinguished career. The 6th Baronet was a distinguished soldier who fought at the Battle of Waterloo. The title became extinct on his death in 1848. They were a junior branch of the ancient Reynell family of East Ogwell and West Ogwell in Devon.

== Reynell baronets, of Laleham (1678) ==
- Sir Richard Reynell, 1st Baronet (1626–1699)
- Sir Richard Reynell, 2nd Baronet (1673–1723)
- Sir Thomas Reynell, 3rd Baronet (1699–1775)
- Sir Richard Reynell, 4th Baronet (c. 1735–1798)
- Sir Richard Littleton Reynell, 5th Baronet (1772–1829)
- Sir Thomas Reynell, 6th Baronet (9 April 1777 – 10 February 1848)
