= Gordon Kennedy =

Gordon Kennedy may refer to:

- Gordon Kennedy (musician) (born 1959), rock musician from the United States
- Gordon Kennedy (actor) (born 1958), Scottish actor
- Gordon Kennedy (minister), Moderator of the General Assembly of the Church of Scotland
