= Richard Reynell (knight) =

Sir Richard Reynell (died 1222) (alias Reinell, Reynolds, Revell, etc), of Pitney (anciently Pyttney, Peteneya, eyc) in the county of Somerset, Sheriff of Devon in 1191-4, was a knight who lived during the successive reigns of Kings Henry II (1154–1189), Richard I (1189–1199) and John (1199–1216).

== Career ==
Revell is said to have been the son of William Revell (Pole, Devonshire, p. 82), probably a landowner, and lord of Revelstoke, Devonshire. He received from Henry II grants of "Curi" or Curry Rivell, and Langport, both in Somerset (MS. Record Office, Cartæ Antiquæ, R., Nos. 11, 12), and is said to have built a castle at Langport (Somerset Archæological Society's Proceedings, XI. i. 8). During the absence of King Richard I on crusade in the Holy Land, in 1191 he was given the custody of the royal fortresses of Exeter Castle in Devon and of Launceston Castle in Cornwall. These castles he stoutly defended against John, Count of Mortain, the king's younger brother, who in the monarch's absence endeavoured to usurp the sovereign power. He served as Sheriff of Devon from 1191–4.

Following the death of King Richard I in 1199, the throne was inherited by his younger brother King John (1199–1216), who remembered the opposition he had received from Revell and deprived him of his estates at Pitney. He was paying rent to the crown in the reign of John, and was at Carrickfergus, Kilkenny, and Dublin in 1210, during the expedition to Ireland of that year (Rotuli de Liberate, &c., pp. 180, 204, 220). He married Mabel, sister and heir of Walter de Esselegh, or Ashley, in Wiltshire, and died in 1222.

== Marriage and children ==
He was succeeded by his son:

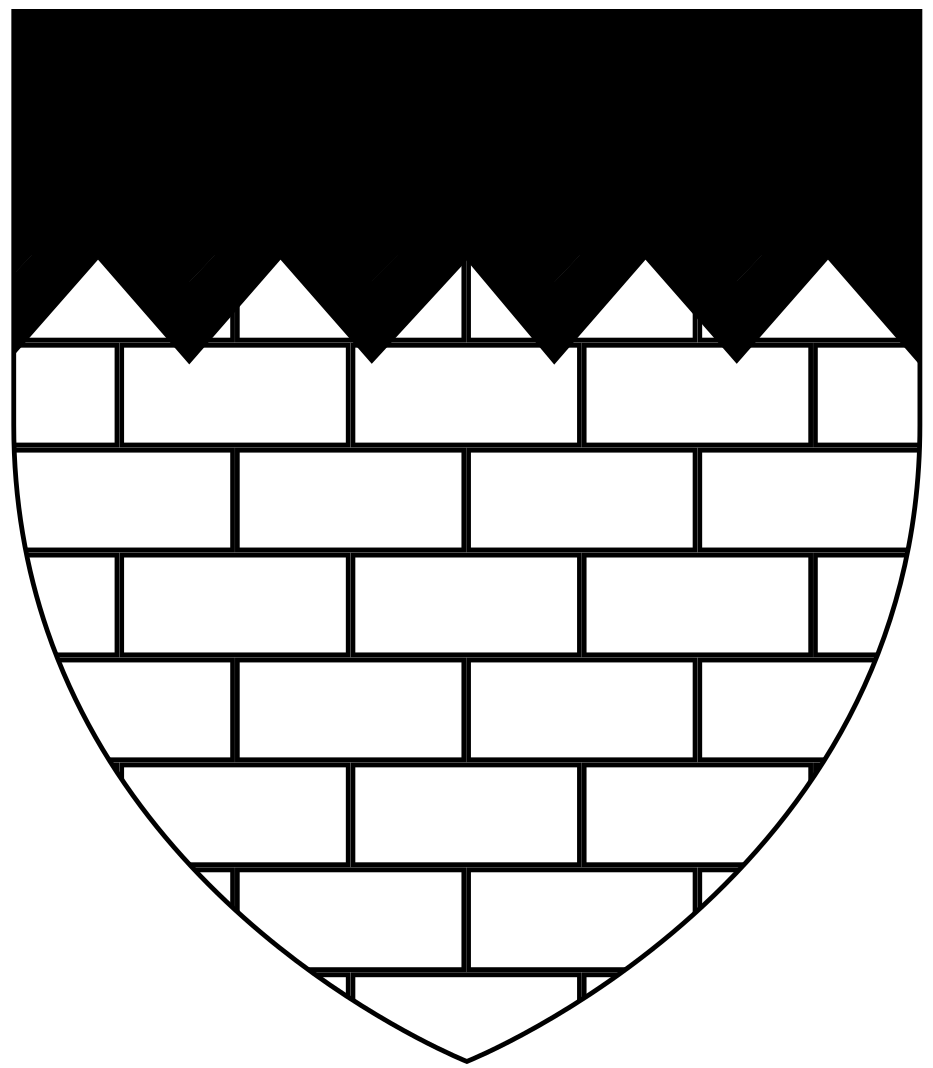
Arms of Reynell, adopted at the start of the age of heraldry (circa 1200–1215): Argent, masonry sable a chief indented of the second

- Sir Richard II Reynell of Pitney, whose lands were restored to him by King John in 1213, for services rendered. Richard II probably predeceased his father, for the elder Richard's heir, subject to the dower of his wife Mabel, who survived him, was his only daughter Sabina, wife of Henry de l'Orti. She survived her husband, who died in 1241, and had livery of the lands of her inheritance in Somerset and Dorset, which passed to her son Henry de l'Orti (de Urtiaco), summoned to parliament in 1299. It is probable that Revel's Hill, near Mintern in Dorset, takes its name from Sir Richard Revell. Contemporaries of Sir Richard were the landowners William Revell in Wiltshire and Hugh Revell in Northamptonshire; their connection with Sir Richard is not known.
