= West Ogwell =

Village in Devon, England

Coordinates: 50.5200°N 3.6256°W

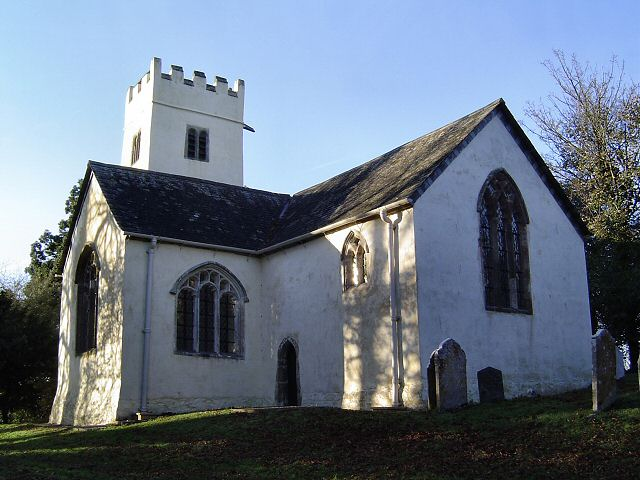
- West Ogwell Church in 2005

- Location within Devon
- Civil parish: Ogwell
- District: Teignbridge
- Shire county: Devon
- Region: South West
- Country: England
- Sovereign state: United Kingdom

West Ogwell is a village and former civil parish and manor, now in the parish of Ogwell, in the Teignbridge district, in the county of Devon, England. It is located 2 miles south-west of the town of Newton Abbot and 1 mile west of the village of East Ogwell. The church and manor house "lie hidden away on their own". In 1891 the parish had a population of 39. In 1894 the parish was abolished and merged with East Ogwell to form "Ogwell".

== Church ==
The disused former parish church (West Ogwell Church), which stands next to the manor house, was built in the 13th century and is a grade I listed building. Since 1982 it has been owned by the Redundant Churches Fund. In the opinion of Pevsner it is of exceptional interest "both for its early structure undisturbed by the usual Perp(endicular) remodelling and because its simple and charming late Georgian interior has escaped radical Victorian restoration". Polwhele wrote of West Ogwell Church in 1793: "West Ogwell is a very small parish containing no more than thirty-five inhabitants . . . West Ogwell Church is dark and damp".

== Manor House ==
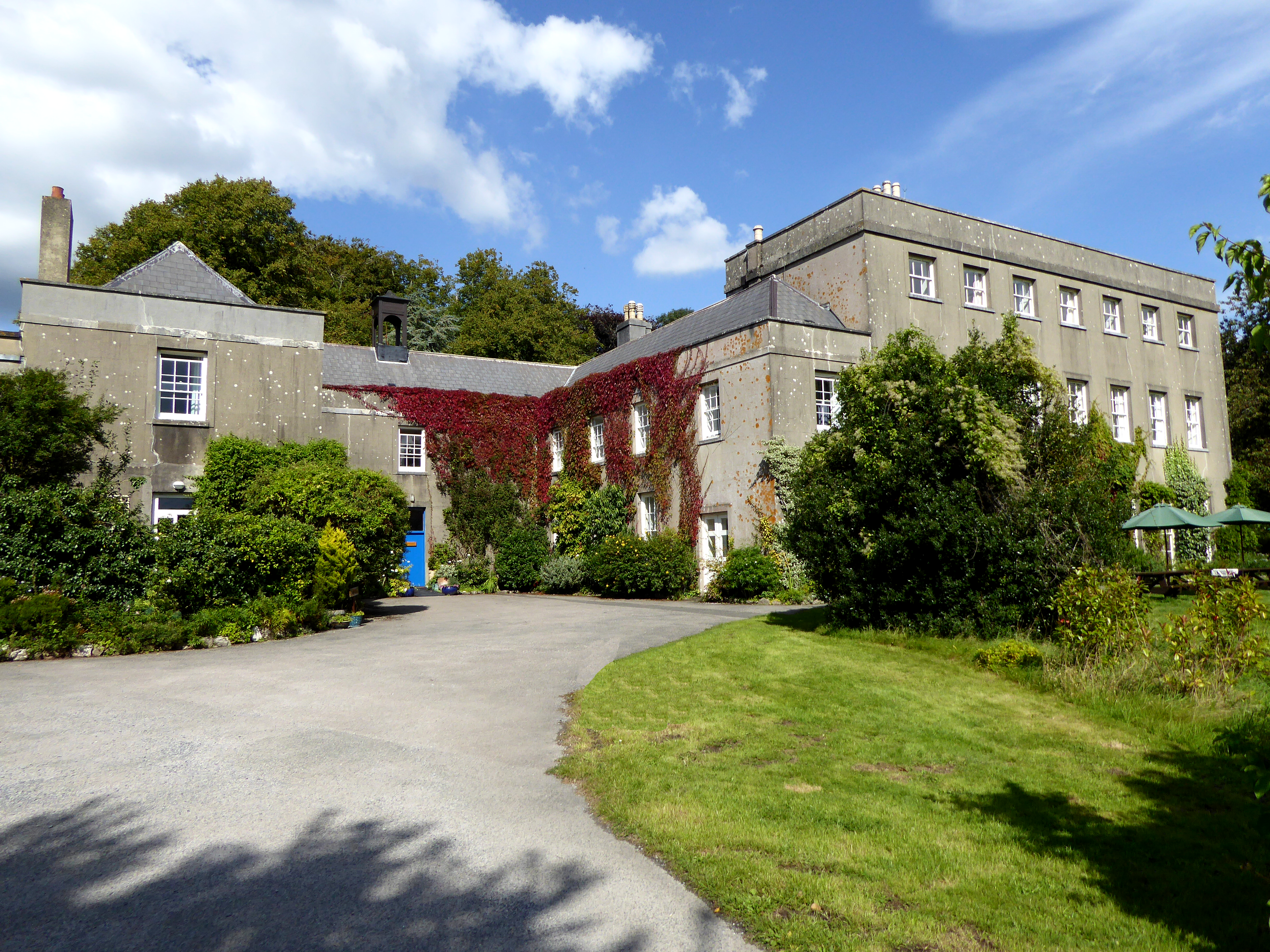
West Ogwell House in 2017, former manor house of West Ogwell, completed in 1790 by Pierce Joseph Taylor (1754-1832). Since 1996 known as Gaia House

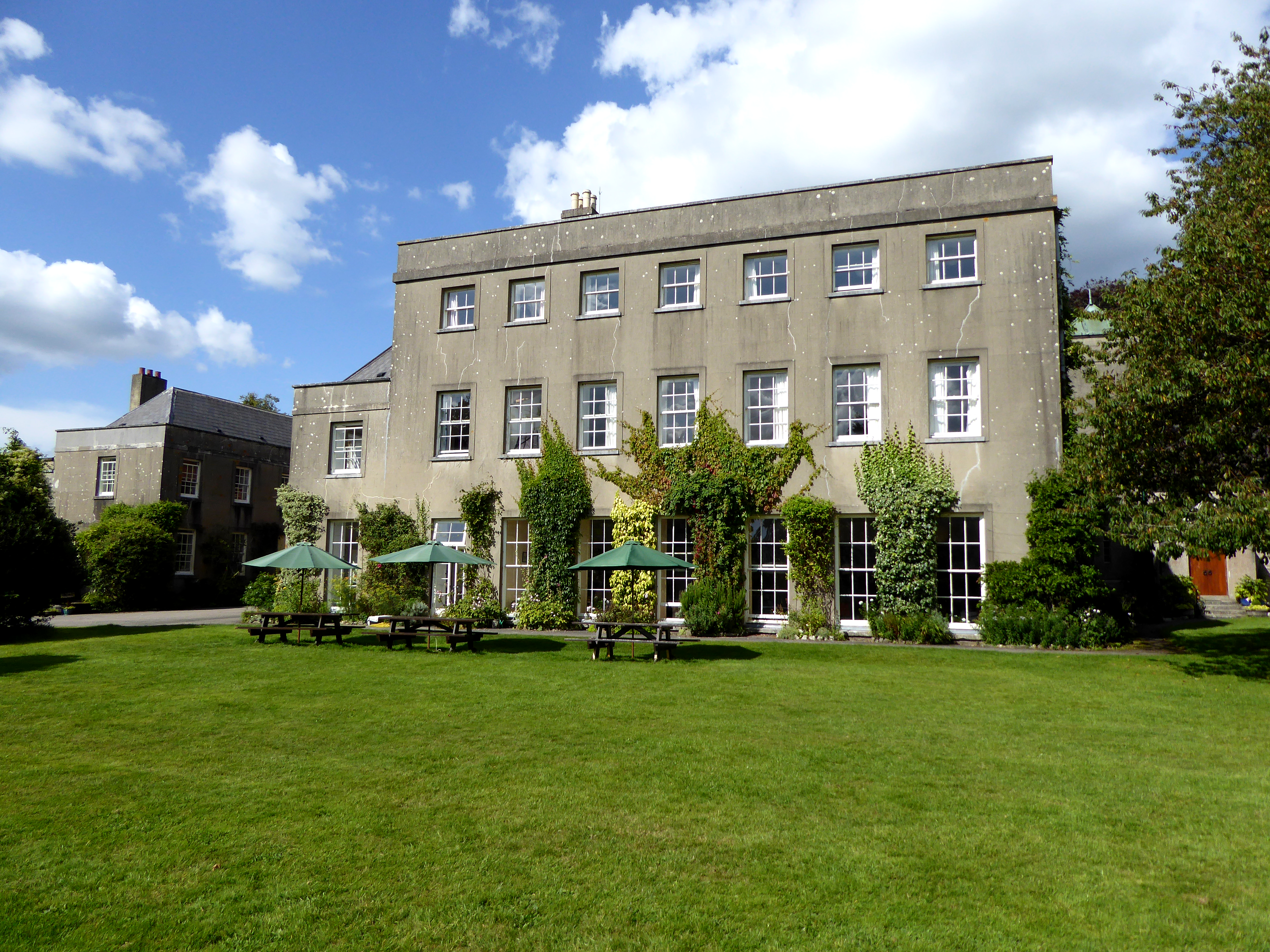
The "overwhelmingly plain exterior" (Pevsner), 1790 south front of West Ogwell House

West Ogwell House, the former manor house of West Ogwell, stands next to the church and is a Georgian structure built in 1790 by Pierce Joseph Taylor. In the opinion of Pevsner it has an "overwhelmingly plain exterior (with) no decoration whatever". It incorporates some remains from the former manor house of the Reynell family (whose earliest Devonshire seat was at adjoining East Ogwell), including stables and outbuildings built in 1588 by Thomas Reynell, as the surviving datestone in the wall of the lean-to building in the courtyard attests by its inscription Anno Domini 1588 T. R..

In 1943 it became the Convent of the Companions of Jesus the Good Shepherd (founded 1920), and a chapel was added in 1955. In 1996 the Convent moved to Windsor and joined with the Community of St John Baptist, In 2001 the Convent moved to Begbroke Priory in Oxfordshire and sold West Ogwell to the Gaia House Trust (the then Gaia House being situated at the Old Vicarage in nearby Denbury) whereupon it became the home of a Buddhist centre, which changed the name of the building to "Gaia House. It uses it as "a quiet retreat for meditation and contemplation".

== Descent of the manor ==
The manor was anciently called West Woggewill.

=== Peytevin ===
During the reign of King Henry II (1154-1189) West Ogwell was held by Hugh Peytevin (alias Peitevyn, etc) (Latinised to Pictavensis, who held it together with other lands by the feudal tenure of knight's service as two knight's fees. He was succeeded by Robert Peytevin, and later by Thomas Peytevin who in 1301/2 held it as one knight's fee from the feudal barony of Berry Pomeroy. The same was later held by William Peytevin in 1345/6.

=== Courtenay ===
West Ogwell was subsequently a possession of the Courtenay Earls of Devon of Tiverton Castle.

=== Reynell ===
West Ogwell was purchased from the Courtenays by the Reynell family, then seated at the adjoining manor of East Ogwell, where they had settled in the 14th century. Walter Reynell (fl.1363/4) from Cambridgeshire having married Margaret Stighull, daughter and heiress of William Stighull of Malston.

=== Taylor ===
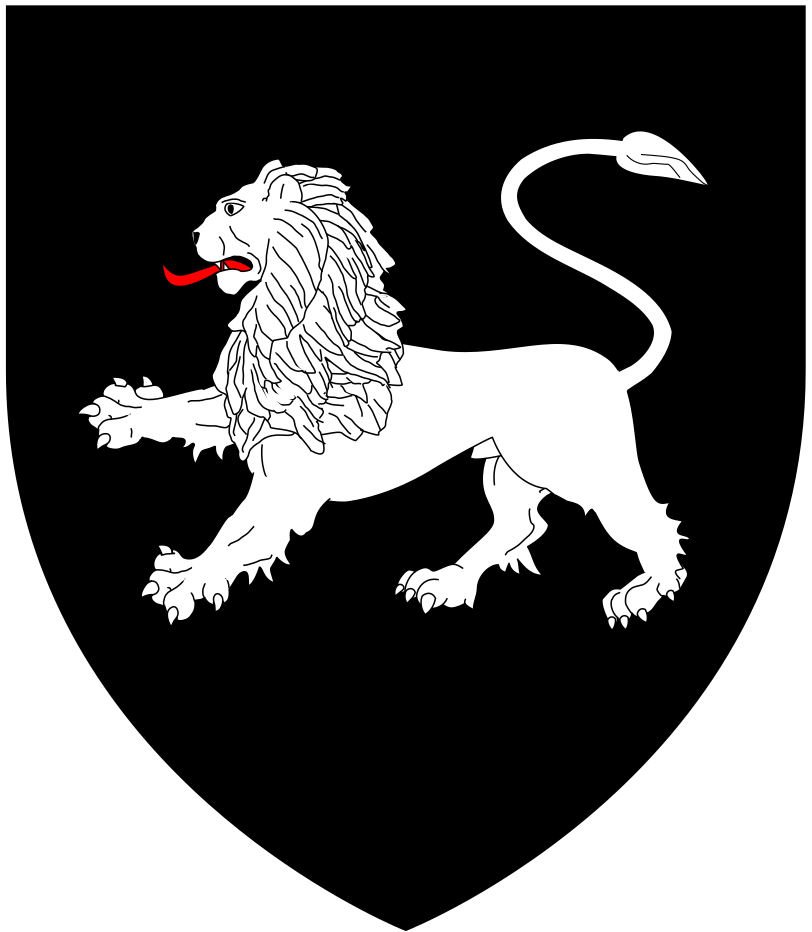
Arms of Taylor of West Ogwell: Sable, a lion passant argent

==== Joseph Taylor (c.1693-1746) ====
In 1726, Joseph Taylor (c.1693–1746) married Rebecca Whitrow, daughter of John Whitrow of Dartmouth and niece and heiress of Richard Reynell (c.1681–1734/5) of East Ogwell, West Ogwell and of Denbury near Ashburton, twice elected a Member of Parliament for Ashburton 1702–8 and 1711–34. Joseph Taylor was the son of Captain Joseph Taylor (died 1733), Royal Navy, of Plymouth, whose family was from Lyme Regis in Dorset, who was captain of the flag-ship stationed at Plymouth at the time of the death of Queen Anne in 1714, and whose monument is in Denbury Church. He was a Member of Parliament for Ashburton 1739-41 and was educated at Exeter College, Oxford and as a law student at the Middle Temple. Richard Reynell had bequeathed his estates "to be sold for the benefit of" his niece Rebecca Whitrow, Taylor's wife, and Taylor duly purchased such estates as the "absolute estate of inheritance — in Devon or elsewhere" which, as required by his marriage settlement, he settled upon his wife and his eldest son.

==== Thomas Taylor (born 1727) ====
Thomas Taylor (born 1727), eldest son, who married Eliza Pierce (d.1776), daughter and heiress of Adam Pierce of Yendacott in the parish of Shobrooke, Devon. As her surviving correspondence reveals she was "a cultured and intelligent woman, who had strong opinions of her own concerning not only the running of her life but also on the subjects of books and literature". In about 1750 Thomas Taylor began to rebuild the manor house at West Ogwell, as recorded by Polwhele (1793): "Three parts of this parish at present are the property of Mr Taylor who built a large house here about forty years ago but left it unfinished. It stands near the church and is occupied by Farmer Howard, who rents the estate and whose family are more than half the parisioners."

==== Pierce Joseph Taylor (1754-1832) ====
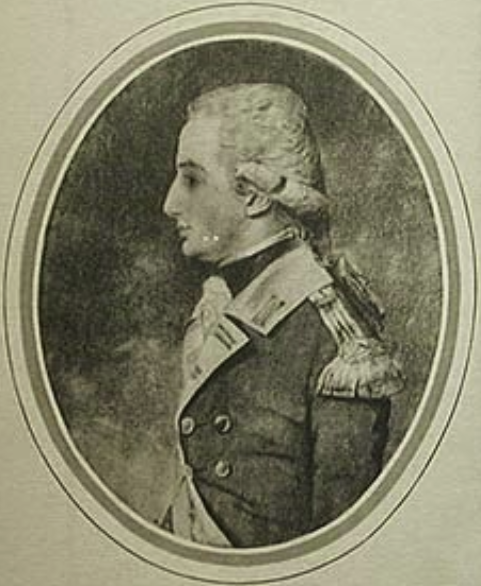
Portrait of Pierce Joseph Taylor (1754-1832) by John Downman (1750-1824)

Pierce Joseph Taylor (1754-1832) of West Ogwell and of Denbury House, near Ashburton, son and heir, who in 1790 completed the rebuilding of West Ogwell House commenced by his father. The manor house of East Ogwell was then abandoned. Polwhele (1793) wrote of East Ogwell Church: "Close adjoining to the church are the ivy-grown ruins of the mansion house of the Reynells, inhabited at present by large flocks of pigeons". Pierce Joseph Taylor was educated at Eton College and his correspondence whilst a pupil there to his mother survives (See: The Letters of Eliza Pierce 1751-1775, with Letters from her son Pierce Joseph Taylor, a schoolboy at Eton, Edited by Violet M. Macdonald, London, 1927). He was promoted to Lt-Captain to Captain in the 3rd Dragoon Guards in January 1779. In 1781 when a Captain in the 21st Light Dragoons his portrait was painted by John Downman. He married Charlotte Cooke (d.1837), 5th daughter of Rev. William Cooke, Dean of Ely and Provost of King's College, Cambridge.

==== Maj-Gen Thomas William Taylor (1782-1854) ====
Maj-Gen Thomas William Taylor (1782-1854), CB, of Ogwell House, son, was an officer of the Honourable East India Company at Madras, and later Lt-Gov of the Royal Military College, Sandhurst and a Groom of the Bedchamber to King William IV. His mural monument survives in Denbury Church. He married Anne Harney Petrie, a daughter of John Petrie of Gatton in Surrey. His daughters included:

- Ann Frances Taylor (d.1861) wife of Sir Walter Palk Carew, 8th Baronet (1807–1874) of Haccombe, Devon, whose funerary hatchment survives in Haccombe Church showing the arms of Carew impaling Taylor (Sable, a lion passant argent langued gules< with a label of three points azure for difference) where they are also shown in a stained glass window dedicated to Ann Frances Taylor.
- Georgiana Jane Taylor, wife of Robert Verney, 17th Baron Willoughby de Broke (1809-1862) of Compton Verney in Warwickshire.

=== Scratton ===
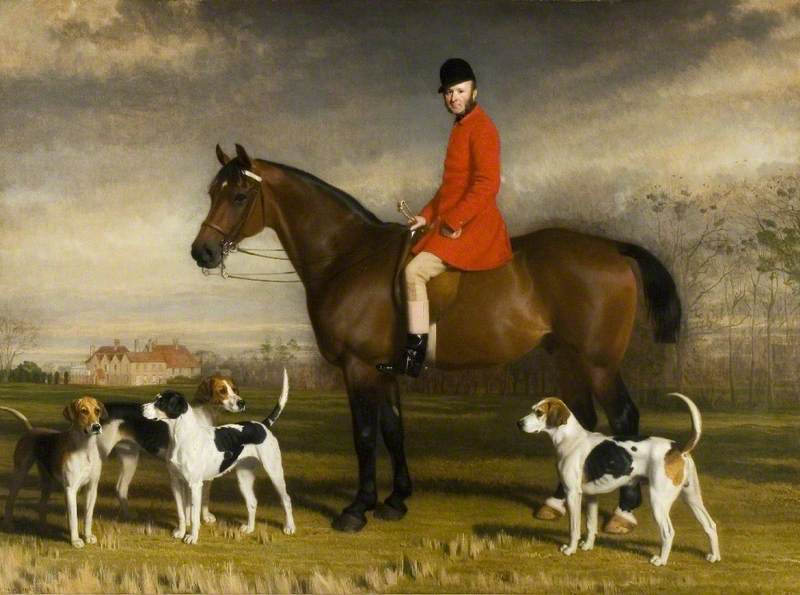
1867 portrait of Daniel Robert Scratton (1819-1902) by Stephen Pearce (1819–1904), Southend Museum

In 1869 West Ogwell was purchased by Daniel Robert Scratton (1819-1902) of Prittlewell Priory, Southend-on-Sea, and of Milton Hall, Prittlewell, both in Essex, a Justice of the Peace and Deputy Lieutenant of Devon. He and his wife Maria Thornton (1817-1901), 2nd daughter of James Thornton, were popular locally and supplied running water to the house and villages of West Ogwell and East Ogwell. He was a noted breeder of cattle and of pointer dogs. In 1890 the estate of West Ogwell comprised almost 700 acres with a deer park. His obituary stated as follows:

"He made the place famous in the agricultural world, devoting to the farm he established there such personal care as if he had to make his living out of the land. He recognized to the full the duties and claims attaching to the possession of property. He built schools, founded a cottage hospital, gave at considerable cost a water-supply to Ogwell, lighted his parish church with acetylene gas, and also provided it with an organ, and when someone was wanted to blow it he undertook the work, saying, as he could not sing, he wanted to do something. He was a busy, active man, fond of work for its own sake. He had tried every kind of sport, he used to say but had found nothing so satisfying as work. He was Chairman of the Newton Abbot Board of Guardians for some time, Secretary of the Hospital at Newton Abbot, Honorary Clerk to the School Boards of Denbury and Ogwell, and Clerk to the Parish Councils of the same places".

The couple's inscribed gravestone is situated in the graveyard of West Ogwell Church beside the south chancel wall. On his death in 1902 West Ogwell House passed to his cousin Edward Joshua Blackburn Scratton (1854-1916), a lawyer, who sold it to the farmer resident next door at West Ogwell Barton, who used the manor house as a store for his farm produce.
