= East Ogwell =

Village in Devon, England

Coordinates: 50.518790°N 3.6380460°W

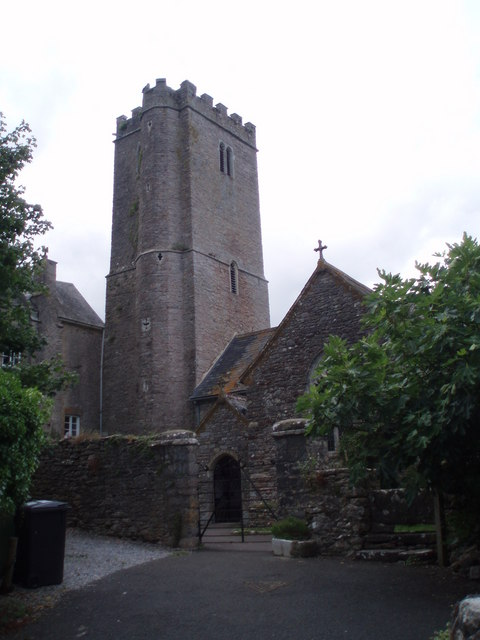

- Location within Devon
- Area: 0.367 km^{2} (0.142 sq mi)
- Population: 855 (2018 estimate)
  - Density: 2,330/km^{2} (6,000/sq mi)
- Civil parish: Ogwell
- District: Teignbridge
- Shire county: Devon
- Region: South West
- Country: England
- Sovereign state: United Kingdom
- Police: Devon and Cornwall
- Fire: Devon and Somerset
- Ambulance: South Western

East Ogwell is a village 15 miles (24 km) south of Exeter, in the civil parish of Ogwell, in the Teignbridge district, in the county of Devon, England. In 2018 it had an estimated population of 855.

== Amenities ==
East Ogwell has a church called St Bartholomew located in the centre of the village.

== History ==
The name "Ogwell" means 'Wocga's spring/stream'. The "East" part distinguishes it from West Ogwell. East Ogwell was recorded in the Domesday Book as Ogewille. In 1891 the parish had a population of 271. On 1 April 1894 the parish was abolished and merged with West Ogwell to form Ogwell. A branch of the ancient Reynell family, who became the Reynell Baronets, lived here for centuries.
