= Nicholas Michel =

Member of the Parliament of England

Nicholas Michel (fl. 1353), was an English Member of Parliament and merchant.

He was a Member (MP) of the Parliament of England for Coventry in 1353. He was Mayor of Coventry on several occasions.

Parliament of England
Preceded by John de Percy; Nicholas de Hunt	Member of Parliament for Coventry; 1353; With: Richard de Stoke	Succeeded by no representation no representation
