= Sir Clement Fisher, 2nd Baronet =

English politician

Clement Fisher
- 2nd Baronet
- Tenure: 29 March 1647 – 15 April 1683
- Predecessor: Robert Fisher, 1st Baronet
- Successor: Clement Fisher, 3rd Baronet
- Born: 1613
- Baptised: 9 March 1813
- Died: 15 April 1683 (aged 69–70)
- Buried: Great Packington, Warwickshire

Sir Clement Fisher, 2nd Baronet (1613 - 15 April 1683) was an English politician who sat in the House of Commons from 1661 to 1679. He supported the Royalist cause in the English Civil War.

== Life ==
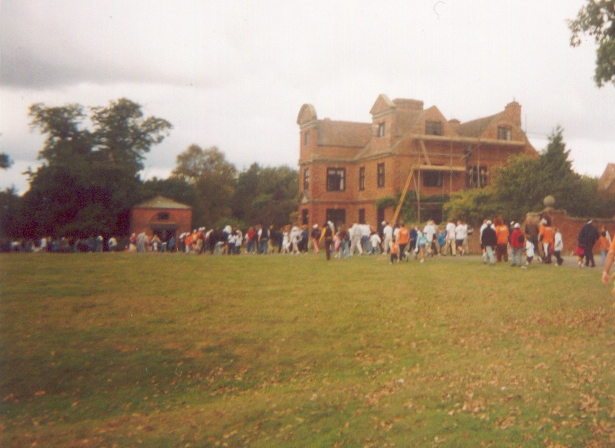
Packington Old Hall, Great Packington.

Fisher was the son of Sir Robert Fisher, 1st Baronet of Great Packington, Warwickshire and his wife Elizabeth Tyringham, daughter of Sir Anthony Tyringham of Tyringham, Buckinghamshire. His father was created Baronet Fisher of Great Packington on 7 December 1622.

During the Civil War with his father, he suffered for his support of the King. He succeeded to the baronetcy on the death of his father on 29 March 1647. He was fined £1,711, on 24 January 1648, which was reduced to £1,140.

In 1661, Fisher was elected Member of Parliament for Coventry in the Cavalier Parliament.

He built Packington Old Hall in 1679.

Fisher died at the age of about 70 and was buried at Great Packington.

== Marriage ==
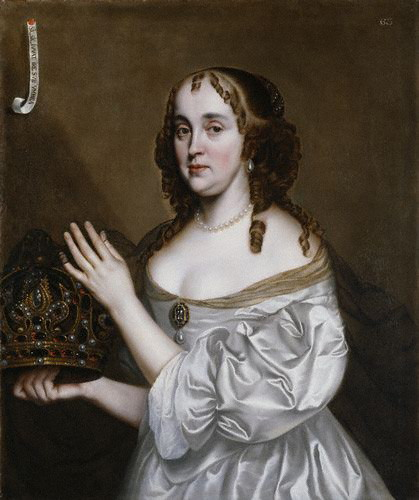
Portrait of Jane Lane, Lady Fisher.

Fisher married Jane Lane daughter of Thomas Lane, of Bentley, Staffordshire and his wife Anne Bagot, daughter of Walter Bagot, of Blithfield on 8 December 1662 with the wedding officiated by Gilbert Sheldon, Archbishop of Canterbury. She had helped Charles II, to escape after the Battle of Worcester in September 1651, for which she was granted £1,000 a year for life after the Restoration. They had no children and he was succeeded in the baronetcy by his nephew, also called Clement Fisher.

Parliament of England
| Preceded by Richard Hopkins; William Jesson | Member of Parliament for Coventry; 1661–1679; With: Thomas Flynt 1661–1670; Richard Hopkins | Succeeded by Robert Beake; Richard Hopkins |
Baronetage of England
| Preceded by Robert Fisher | Baronet (of Packington Magna); 1647–1683 | Succeeded by Clement Fisher |
