= Roger Cave =

English politician and baronet

Sir Roger Cave, 2nd Baronet (21 September 1655 – 11 October 1703) was an English politician and baronet.

== Life ==
Roger Cave was the oldest son of Sir Thomas Cave, 1st Baronet and his second wife Hon. Penelope Wenman, daughter of Thomas Wenman, 2nd Viscount Wenman. In 1671, he succeeded his father as baronet and had Stanford Hall, Leicestershire, built on the site of the old manor house. He was educated at Christ's College, Cambridge.

Cave was High Sheriff of Northamptonshire for 1679–80 and then Member of Parliament (MP) for Coventry from 1685 until 1690.

On 26 March 1676, Cave married firstly Martha Browne, daughter of John Browne, and then secondly Mary Bromley, daughter of Sir William Bromley. He had five sons and two daughters by his first wife and a son and two daughters by his second wife. Cave died in 1703 and was succeeded by his oldest son Sir Thomas Cave, 3rd Baronet.

Parliament of England
Preceded by John Stratford; Richard Hopkins	Member of Parliament for Coventry; 1685–1690; With: Sir Thomas Norton 1685–1689; John Stratford 1689–1690	Succeeded by Richard Hopkins; John Stratford
Baronetage of England
Preceded by Thomas Cave	Baronet (of Stanford); 1671–1703	Succeeded by Thomas Cave
