= List of mayors of Coventry =

The title Lord Mayor of Coventry was created on 3 June 1953 when the dignity was conferred on the city of Coventry, England by Letters Patent as part of the Coronation celebrations of Queen Elizabeth II. Prior to that Coventry had had a Mayor since it was granted its Charter of Incorporation by King Edward III in 1345.

The Lord Mayor is the Chairman of the City Council and has the casting vote. As Coventry's first citizen, they are the non-political, ceremonial head of the city.

== Notable Mayors of Coventry ==
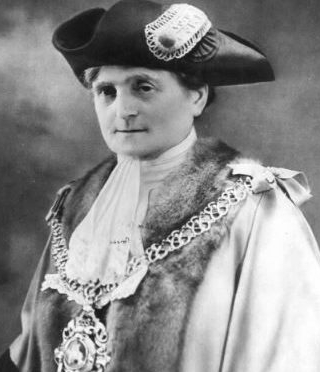
Alice Arnold, Coventry's first female mayor (in 1937) wearing mayoral regalia

- 1546-7: John Harford
- 1583 Henry Breres (MP for Coventry, 1586 and 1601)
- 1587 Henry Sewall (MP for Coventry, 1621)
- 1606 Henry Sewall
- 1609 Sampson Hopkins (MP for Coventry, 1614 and 1621)
- 1631 William Jesson (MP for Coventry, 1640)
- 1633 Simon Norton (MP for Coventry, 1640)
- 1634 John Barker (MP for Coventry, 1640)
- 1655 Robert Beake (MP for Coventry, 1654–1660)
- 1834 George Eld (antiquary and editor of the Coventry Standard)
- 1835 H. Cadwallader Adams
- 1858 W. Wilmot
- 1861–1862 Thomas Soden
- 1889–1891 Alderman Charles John Hill
- 1891–1894 George Singer (founder of Singer Cycle Company)
- 1894–1903 Alderman Tomson (Liberal)
- 1911–1912 William Fitzthomas Wyley (Colonel and Founder of Coventry and Warwickshire Society of Artists)
- 1913–1914 Siegfried Bettmann (founder of Triumph Cycle company)
- 1937 Alice Arnold – trade unionist; first female mayor
- 1941 Alfred Robert Grindlay (industrialist, founder of Grindlay Peerless Cycle Company and Mayor during the Coventry Blitz)

== Lord Mayors of Coventry ==
Coventry's Lord Mayors have included:

- 1953: Hamblet Bertie Warner Cresswell
- 1954: John Fennell (First Lord Mayor)
- 1955: Thomas Henry Dewis
- 1956: William Isaac Thomson
- 1957: Pearl Marguerite Hyde
- 1958: Harold Henry Kemble Winslow
- 1959: William Henry Edwards
- 1960: Harry Stanley
- 1961: William Callow
- 1962: Arthur James Waugh, Snr
- 1963: Emily Allen Allen
- 1964: Thomas Henry Whiteman
- 1965: William Parfitt
- 1966: Edwin Moody Rogers
- 1967: Eric James Williams
- 1968: Leonard Lamb
- 1969: William Frederick Burdett
- 1970: Sidney John Cordery
- 1971: Tom Meffen
- 1972: Wilfred Spencer (died)
- 1973: Gerard William Sheridan
- 1974: John Dennis Berry
- 1975: Charles Ward
- 1976: Robert Frederick Loosley
- 1977: Ralph Clews
- 1978: Charles McKenzie Maxwell (died)
- 1978: Kenneth Bertram Benfield
- 1979: Harry Richards
- 1980: Tom McLatchie
- 1981: Philip Walter George Robinson
- 1982: Edgar William Weaver
- 1983: Joseph Thompson
- 1984: Walter Sidney Brandish
- 1985: William McKernan
- 1986: Winifred Eva Lakin
- 1987: Jeffrey Desmond White
- 1988: Arthur James Waugh, Jnr
- 1989: David John Cairns
- 1990: William Arthur Hardy
- 1991: David H. Edwards
- 1992: Samuel Donald Ewart
- 1993: Alex M. Boyd
- 1994: Nick Nolan
- 1995: Joseph Clifford
- 1996: Arthur J. (Stan) Hodson
- 1997: John Mutton
- 1998: Maggie Rosher
- 1999: Joan Wright
- 2000: Sheila Collins
- 2001: Dave Chater
- 2002: Ken Taylor
- 2003: Sucha Singh Bains
- 2004: John Victor Gazey (June)
- 2005: Ram Parkash Lakha
- 2006: Shabbir Ahmed
- 2007: Dave Batten
- 2008: Andy Matchet
- 2009: Jack Harrison
- 2010: Brian Kelsey
- 2011: Keiran Mulhall
- 2012: Tim Sawdon
- 2013: Gary Crookes
- 2014: Hazel Noonan
- 2015: Michael Hammon
- 2016: Lindsley Harvard
- 2017: Tony Skipper
- 2018: John Blundell
- 2019: Linda Bigham
- 2020: Ann Lucas
- 2021: John McNicholas
- 2022: Kevin Maton
