= Peter Barron (disambiguation) =

Peter Barron (born 1962) is a Northern Irish journalist and Google's head of communications for Europe, the Middle East, and Africa.

Peter Barron or Baron may also refer to:

- Peter-James Barron (born 1989), Irish cross-country skier
- Peter Barron (merchant), 19th-century British merchant
- Petr Baron (born 1980), Russian businessman
- Peter Baron (MP), Member of Parliament for Coventry
