= Henry Breres =

English merchant and politician

Henry Breres (died 1619) was an English merchant and politician who sat in the House of Commons at various times between 1586 and 1611.

Breres was born in Preston, Lancashire. He became a wealthy draper in Coventry. He was an Alderman for the town and was sheriff from 1575 to 1576 and mayor from 1583 to 1584. In 1586, he was elected Member of Parliament for Coventry. He subscribed £25 to the Armada loan and lent money to the city on several occasions. In 1589 he was elected MP for Coventry again. He served a second term as mayor of Coventry in 1597. In 1601 he was elected MP for Coventry again. In February 1604 he was granted, by Coventry council, a share of the lease of St Michael's rectory. He was re-elected MP for Coventry in 1604.

Breres died between January 1619 when he made his will and May 1619 when it was proved.

Breres married twice and had a daughter Mary.

Parliament of England
Preceded by Edward Boughton; Thomas Wight	Member of Parliament for Coventry; 1586–1589; With: Thomas Saunders	Succeeded by Thomas Saunders; John Myles
Preceded by Henry Kervyn; Thomas Saunders	Member of Parliament for Coventry; 1601–1611; With: Thomas Saunders 1601; John Rogerson; Sir John Harington	Succeeded by Sir Robert Coke; Sampson Hopkins
