= Sir Henry Jackson, 2nd Baronet =

British Liberal Party politician

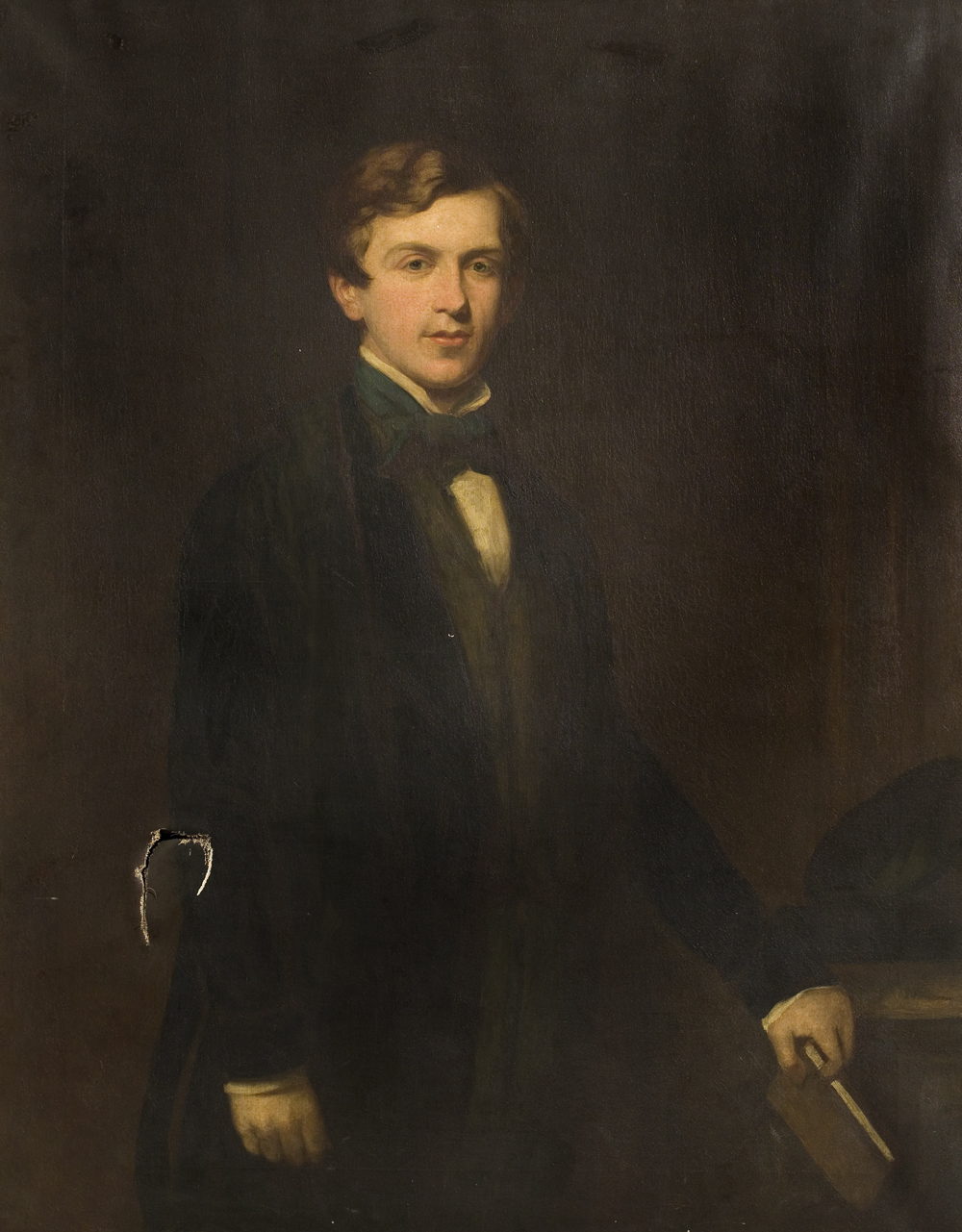
Sir Henry Jackson whilst at Oxford by Thomas Henry Illidge.

Sir Henry Mather Jackson, 2nd Baronet, DL (23 July 1831 – 8 March 1881) was a British Liberal Party politician who served as a Member of Parliament (MP) for Coventry from 1867 to 1868, and from 1874 to 1881, when he became a High Court judge.

== Early life ==
Jackson was the eldest son of the Sir William Jackson, 1st Baronet (1805–1876) of Birkenhead, a businessman who made his first fortune from palm oil imports, a second fortune in property development, before becoming an industrialist and railway entrepreneur and later a Liberal MP. His mother was Elizabeth née Hughes, from Liverpool.

He was educated at Harrow and matriculated in 1850 at Trinity College, Oxford, where he graduated in 1853 with a B.A. in Classics. He was called to the bar in 1855 at Lincoln's Inn, and took silk in 1873.

His address was listed in 1881 as Llantilio Court, Abergavenny, Monmouthshire. The house was located at Llantilio Crossenny, about six miles east of Abergavenny. Jackson had bought it in 1873 from Henry Morgan-Clifford, the former MP for Hereford, and after his death it remained the home of his son Sir Henry Mather Jackson, 3rd Baronet. The house was demolished in 1922, leaving only the foundations and undercroft, although the landscaped park remains.

Llantilio Court and the baronetcy were inherited by his son, the 3rd Baronet, who was appointed in 1916 to a tribunal to consider appeals in Monmouthshire against conscription under the Military Service Act 1916. As Chairman of the Monmouthshire Appeals Tribunal, the third baronet was made a Commander of the Order of the British Empire (CBE) in June 1918, for "services in connection with the war".

== Political career ==
Jackson first stood for Parliament at the 1865 general election, when he was unsuccessful in his native borough of Birkenhead. After the death in 1867 of Morgan Treherne, one of the two MPs for Coventry, Jackson won the resulting by-election on 23 July 1867. The result was declared void after an election petition, but fellow Liberal Samuel Carter was elected in his place. When he and Jackson stood again at the 1868 general election, both seats were won by Conservatives. Jackson was returned to the House of Commons at the 1874 general election, and was re-elected in 1880.

He was commissioned in June 1876 as a Deputy Lieutenant of Monmouthshire, a position also held from May 1885 by his son, Sir Henry Mather Jackson, 3rd Baronet. In 1879, Jackson was appointed to a Royal Commission to enquire into the condition of Cathedrals in England and Wales and their clergy. He left Parliament in 1881 when he was appointed as a judge of the Queen's Bench division of the High Court, but died shortly afterwards, aged 49.

Parliament of the United Kingdom
Preceded by Henry Eaton; Alexander Staveley Hill	Member of Parliament for Coventry; 1874–1881; With: Henry Eaton 1874–1880; William Wills 1880–1881	Succeeded by William Wills; Henry Eaton
Baronetage of the United Kingdom
Preceded by William Jackson	Baronet (of Birkenhead); 1876–1881	Succeeded by Henry Mather-Jackson
