= Ram Parkash Lakha =

British Labour Party politician

Councillor Ram Parkash Lakha

Lord Mayor of Coventry
- In office May 2005 – May 2006

Member of Coventry City Council for Binley and Willenhall
- Incumbent
- Assumed office 1989

Personal details
- Born: Nawan Pind Naicha, Jalandhar, India
- Party: Labour (1977–present)

Ram Parkash Lakha OBE was Lord Mayor of Coventry for 2005 to 2006. He was first elected in May 1989 in Upper Stoke Ward. Then after with one years’ absence, he was elected in May 1991 to represent Binley and Willenhall Ward and has been serving this ward as Labour Councillor since then.

== Early life ==
Lakha was born into a Ravidasia Sikh family in a small village (Nawan Pind Naicha) in the Indian Punjab in 1949. Lakha gained a degree in economics, politics, and English from Panjab University, later working as a civil servant before coming to Coventry in 1977.

== Socio-political roles ==
He was appointed Deputy Lord Mayor of Coventry for 2004 to 2005 and then Lord Mayor of Coventry for 2005 to 2006. He served on the West Midlands Fire and Civil Defence Authority for one year as a representative of the council and also served as a non-executive director of Whitefriars Housing Group. He was a governor of Coventry Technical College during 1989–1990 and served as a school governor at Stoke Park Secondary School for over ten years. He is currently the school governor at Willenhall Community Primary School. During his tenure as president of the Shri Guru Ravidass Sabha UK, he helped the development of the Shri Guru Ravidass Technical College in Phagwara, Punjab, by supporting the fundraising efforts.

== Opposition to caste discrimination ==
He was a victim of political caste discrimination during the initial days of his political life. He faced caste discrimination from the Indian Brahmin and Jatt communities in Coventry because they could not tolerate him on the front lines of politics. Hence, they organised his deselection as a Labour Party candidate at the end of his one-year term in 1990. Because of his work within the Labour Party, he was selected from Binley and Willenhall Wards by all "white" members of the Labour Party in 1991. With their support, he won the election, and since then, he has carried on being selected as a Labour candidate and winning to continue as a Labour councillor.
