= Richard Spicer =

Richard Spicer may refer to:

- Richard Spicer alias Newport, MP for Portsmouth
- Richard de Spicer, MP for Coventry
- Richard Spicer (MP for Huntingdon)
