= Sampson Hopkins =

English merchant and politician

Sampson Hopkins (died 1622) was an English merchant and politician who sat in the House of Commons between 1614 and 1622.

Hopkins was the son of Sir Richard Hopkins of Coventry. He was a draper of Coventry and a puritan. In 1605 he sheltered Princess Elizabeth (later Queen of Bohemia) at his house at Palace Yard in Earl Street, which was built on the courtyard plan. (The building was destroyed by bombing in 1940.) He was Mayor of Coventry in 1609. In 1614, he was elected Member of Parliament for Coventry. He was described as being "always so cross and violent in the parliament against the King's affairs" and this was attributed to the nature of the faction in Coventry which he represented. Nevertheless, Hopkins met the king several times and in 1621 the king granted the city a new charter regulating the election of council members. Hopkins was re-elected MP for Coventry in 1621.

Hopkins died in 1622.

Hopkins married as his second wife Jane Butts and was the father of Richard who was also MP for Coventry. His daughter Anne married Matthew Babington.

Parliament of England
Preceded by Henry Breres; Sir John Harington	Member of Parliament for Coventry; 1614–1622; With: Sir Robert Coke 1614; Henry Sewall 1622	Succeeded by Sir Edward Coke; Henry Harwell
