= Sound Currency Association =

The Sound Currency Association was a British pressure group formed in early 1920 as a result of a conference of bankers, traders and economists held in December 1919 to consider the financial outlook which seemed to observers to be particularly grave.

The main purpose of the Association was to campaign for the concept of Sound money and to persuade the Treasury to contract gradually the issue of Treasury notes so they should once again have an equal value to the gold which they represented. This objective was achieved when Winston Churchill, as Chancellor of the Exchequer, returned Britain to the Gold Standard in 1925. The Association also campaigned for public awareness of the dangers of inflation and the need for monetary stability. Even after the return to the Gold Standard the Association continued as a pressure group for sound money until the decision to transfer the Treasury note issue to the Issue Department of the Bank of England.

The first president of the Sound Currency Association was Lord D’Abernon who was in office from the formation of the Association until his appointment as British Ambassador to Berlin in 1923. He was succeeded by Lord Beauchamp. Chairman of the Executive Committee of the Association throughout its whole existence was David Marshall Mason, Liberal MP for Coventry from 1910-18 and Edinburgh East from 1931-35.

The Association was officially wound up at a special meeting of its executive committee in late December 1928 in a formal debate initiated by Sir Hugh Bell. Churchill was among those congratulating the Association on its work and achievements.

== Sources ==
- The Times, 24 December 1928 p.8
- Irving Fisher & Hans R. L. Cohrssen, Stable Money: A History of the Movement - Adelphi Company, 1934
