= Henry Gisborne =

Henry Gisborne may refer to:

- Henry Fyshe Gisborne (1813–1841), Australian public servant
- Henry Paterson Gisborne (1888–1953), British solicitor and politician
