= Fisher baronets =

Extinct baronetcy in the Baronetage of England

There have been two baronetcies created for persons with the surname Fisher, both in the Baronetage of England.

Arms of Fisher of Great Packington, Warwickshire: Argent, a chevron vair between three demi-lions rampant gules

The Fisher Baronetcy, of Packington Magna in the County of Warwick, was created in the Baronetage of England on 7 December 1622 for Robert Fisher of Packington Hall, Great Packington, Warwickshire. The second baronet sat as member of parliament for Coventry. The third baronet died without a male heir and the Packington estates passed to his daughter Mary, wife of the Earl of Aylesford. The fourth baronet died in 1739, when the baronetcy became dormant. An unsuccessful claim was lodged a few years ago. For more information, follow this link.

The Fisher Baronetcy, of St Giles in the County of Middlesex, was created in the Baronetage of England on 19 July 1627 for Thomas Fisher. The title became extinct on the death of the fourth baronet in 1707.

== Fisher baronets, of Packington Magna (1622) ==
- Sir Robert Fisher, 1st Baronet (1579–1647)
- Sir Clement Fisher, 2nd Baronet (1613–1683), son
- Sir Clement Fisher, 3rd Baronet (c. 1675–1729), nephew
- Sir Robert Fisher, 4th Baronet (died 1739)

== Fisher baronets, of St Giles (1627) ==
Escutcheon of the Fisher baronets of St Giles

- Sir Thomas Fisher, 1st Baronet (died 1636)
- Sir Thomas Fisher, 2nd Baronet (c. 1623–1670)
- Sir Thomas Fisher, 3rd Baronet (c. 1643–1671)
- Sir Richard Fisher, 4th Baronet (1629–1707)
