= William Ballantine (MP) =

British politician

William Henry Walter Ballantine (1847–1911) was a British Liberal Party politician. He sat in the House of Commons from 1887 to 1895.

Samuelson unsuccessfully contested the 1885 general election in the Tewkesbury division of Gloucestershire. He entered Parliament nearly two years later, when Ballantine was elected at a by-election in July 1887 as the Member of Parliament (MP) for the city of Coventry, following the elevation to the peerage of the Conservative MP Henry Eaton.

He was re-elected at the next general election, in 1892, but was defeated at the 1895 general election and did not stand for Parliament again.

Parliament of the United Kingdom
Preceded by Henry Eaton	Member of Parliament for Coventry; 1887–1895	Succeeded by Charles James Murray
