= John Russell (MP for Coventry) =

14th-century English politician

John Russell was the member of Parliament for Coventry in 1302. He was a city justice.
