= Robert Craven (MP) =

Robert Craven (3 December 1674 – 15 November 1710) was a British Tory politician, elected MP for Coventry in 1710.

Craven was the fourth son of Sir William Craven and his wife Margaret Clapham, daughter of Sir Christopher Clapham. Craven's oldest brother William Craven succeeded as the 2nd Baron Craven in 1697.

He matriculated at Christ Church, Oxford in 1693, and entered the Middle Temple in 1696.

Having stood unsuccessfully at Coventry in 1708, Craven was elected MP for Coventry in 1710, coming top of the poll. However, before the new House of Commons assembled, he contracted smallpox, from which he died on 15 November 1710. He was buried at Binley, Coventry.

Parliament of Great Britain
Preceded by Sir Orlando Bridgeman, Bt; Edward Hopkins	Member of Parliament for Coventry; 17 October – 15 November 1710; With: Thomas Gery	Succeeded by Clobery Bromley; Thomas Gery
