= Richard de Weston =

13th-century English politician

Richard de Weston was the member of Parliament for Coventry in 1295. With Anketil de Coleshull he is the first MP for the city whose name is known. He was a merchant and had been a bailiff.

Queen Eleanor of Castile died at his manor house at Harby, near Lincoln, Nottinghamshire in Nov 1290
