= Kenneth Foster (politician) =

British politician (1866–1930)

John Kenneth Foster (29 May 1866 – 2 March 1930) was a British Conservative Party politician.

He was MP for Coventry in 1910. Like a few Conservatives, he took the seat in the first general election of January that year, but lost it in December 1910.

Parliament of the United Kingdom
Preceded by A. E. W. Mason	Member of Parliament for Coventry; January 1910–December 1910	Succeeded by David Marshall Mason
