= Morgan Treherne =

British politician

Morgan Treherne MP JP DL

Member of Parliament for Coventry
- In office 8 October 1863 – 11 July 1867 Serving with Henry Eaton (1865–1867); Joseph Paxton (1863–1865)
- Preceded by: Edward Ellice; Joseph Paxton
- Succeeded by: Henry Eaton; Henry Jackson

Personal details
- Born: Morgan Thomas; 6 August 1803 Tooting, Surrey
- Died: 11 July 1867 (aged 63)
- Party: Conservative
- Spouse: Louisa Frances Dalrymple (m. 1835)
- Children: Georgina Weldon

Morgan Treherne (6 August 1803 – 11 July 1867), known as Morgan Thomas until 11 November 1856, was a British Conservative Party politician.

== Early life and family ==
Then Thomas was the second son of Rees Goring and Sarah Goring (née Sarah Hovel). He studied at Tooting School in Cheam, Surrey, and then went on to study at Trinity College, Cambridge where he graduated with a BA in 1824, and an MA in 1827. He was then called to the Bar at Inner Temple in 1827.

He married Louisa Frances Dalrymple, only child of John Apsley Dalrymple, in 1835, but they had issue. On 11 November 1856, he eschewed the surname 'Thomas', replacing it by deed poll with the old family of 'Treherne'.

== Political career ==
Treherne stood multiple times for parliament during his life – in 1832, 1833, 1835, 1837, 1857, and 1859 – contesting Coventry each time. He was eventually elected for the seat at a by-election in 1863 and held the seat until his death in 1867.

== Other activities ==
Treherne was also a Justice of the Peace for Sussex and Deputy Lieutenant of Surrey.

Parliament of the United Kingdom
Preceded by Edward Ellice; Joseph Paxton	Member of Parliament for Coventry; 1863–1867; With: Henry Eaton (1865–1867); Joseph Paxton (1863–1865)	Succeeded by Henry Eaton; Henry Jackson
