= Richard Braytoft =

15th-century English politician

Richard Braytoft was the member of Parliament for Coventry in 1460-61 and 1467–68. He was also mayor four times. He was a merchant.
