= Ralph Tewe =

14th-century English politician

Ralph Tewe was the member of Parliament for Coventry in 1302. He was a merchant. He was MP for Leicester (UK Parliament constituency) in 1301.
