= Samuel Carter (Coventry MP) =

English lawyer (1805–1878)

Samuel Carter MP

Member of Parliament for Coventry
- In office 26 March 1868 – 17 November 1868 Serving with Henry Eaton
- Preceded by: Henry Jackson; Henry Eaton
- Succeeded by: Henry Eaton; Alexander Staveley Hill

Personal details
- Born: 15 May 1805 Coventry, Warwickshire, England
- Died: 31 January 1878 (aged 72) Paddington, London, England
- Resting place: Kenilworth, Warwickshire, England
- Party: Liberal
- Spouse: Maria Ronalds (m. 1833)
- Children: Four, including Hugh Carter and John Corrie Carter

Samuel Carter (15 May 1805 – 31 January 1878) was a member of parliament for his native city of Coventry, and solicitor to two major railway companies (the London and North Western Railway and Midland Railway) for nearly four decades during the development of Britain's rail network.

== Life and family ==
Born into a family of the Unitarian faith, his father Samuel was the Coventry prison keeper for many years and his mother Jane was the daughter of Josiah Corrie, a minister in Kenilworth. He attended the school of his uncle John Corrie FRS, who was long-time president of the Birmingham Philosophical Institution. Marrying Sir Francis Ronalds' youngest sister Maria in 1833, they had four children: Alexander, Hugh, John Corrie and Jane. In the 1855–1875 period, they resided at Battle in a substantial estate called Quarry Hill. Samuel died in London, and was buried in the family vault in Kenilworth.

== Railway solicitor ==
Samuel had been articled to his uncle Josiah Corrie, a lawyer in Birmingham, and their partnership was appointed as solicitors to the proposed London & Birmingham Railway (L&BR) in 1830.

They also acted as solicitors to various lines that were planned to connect other communities with the new trunkline. One was the Birmingham & Derby Railway (B&DR) to which Corrie & Carter was appointed in 1835. B&DR joined with other companies in 1844 to form the Midland Railway, with Carter being one of the solicitors to the amalgamation bill (Corrie having died).

Some sources suggest that Carter was instrumental in the decision to establish the Railway Clearing House in 1841, when he and his good friend Robert Stephenson advised the directors of L&BR and B&DR, two of the founding members, on its merits.

Carter was also a solicitor to the bill enabling L&BR to amalgamate with other companies to form the London & North Western Railway (L&NWR) in 1846. By now he had opened a second office in London and he soon acquired a home near Hyde Park. He later purchased a property at Battle.

L&NWR and Midland Railway were quite commonly aligned in the years following and he was able to represent them jointly. This happened for example with the Worcester & Hereford Railway, where he spoke on behalf of both companies at shareholder meetings and served as solicitor to its parliamentary bills.

The 1845–1846 parliamentary session saw the peak of Railway Mania and the beginnings of the Battle of the Gauges, in both of which Carter was much occupied. He and Isambard Kingdom Brunel apparently negotiated a territorial boundary in early 1846 between Brunel's Great Western Railway (GWR) and its affiliates on the broad gauge, and the standard gauge L&NWR and Midland companies, but it was overturned. Thereafter, Carter fought the spread of the broad gauge in various contests in parliament and the courts. He and Stephenson cited the dangers of rival companies using the same infrastructure on different gauges, requiring GWR to build its own stations in Birmingham and elsewhere.

Some of his last parliamentary contests enabled Midland to build its own routes into London to its new St Pancras station and to Scotland on its Settle & Carlisle line.

== Member of parliament ==
Carter was a staunch Liberal in his politics and had participated in the Birmingham Political Union in the 1830s. In a by-election in March 1868, he was elected to parliament for Coventry, which triggered his retirement from railway business. His maiden speech in the house was in support of the proposed Irish Church Act to disestablish the (Anglican) Church of Ireland. He had only a very short parliamentary term however as he and his Liberal colleague Henry Jackson were defeated in the general election in November 1868. He lost again in 1874.

== Benefactor to Coventry ==
Carter funded the building of the Coventry School of Art, laying the foundation stone in 1862. He also donated £1,000 towards the Free Library.

== Publications ==
Carter published several pamphlets in the 1870s illustrating to railway shareholders that the new Railway Commissioners had been given powers to reduce rates and tolls from the amounts permitted in the companies' acts of parliament, thereby jeopardising their investments. His warnings created little consternation at the time but there was uproar a decade later when these powers became more explicit in the 1886 Railway and Canal Traffic bill.

Parliament of the United Kingdom
Preceded by Henry Jackson; Henry Eaton	Member of Parliament for Coventry; March 1868 – November 1868; With: Henry Eaton	Succeeded by Henry Eaton; Alexander Staveley Hill
