= Robert Russell (MP for Coventry) =

13th-century English politician

Robert Russell was the member of Parliament for Coventry in 1298. He was a merchant.
