= Anketil de Coleshull =

13th-century English politician

Anketil de Coleshull was the member of Parliament for Coventry in 1295. With Richard de Weston he is the first MP for the city whose name is known. He had been a bailiff.
