= Jane Lane, Lady Fisher =

English Royalist

Jane Lane
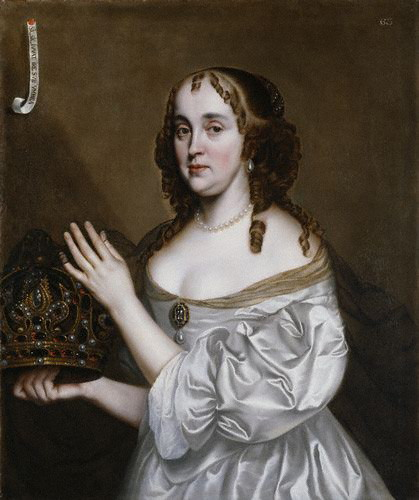
- Portrait of Jane Lane, Lady Fisher which depicts her holding a crown over which she has partially drawn her lace veil
- Born: c. 1626
- Died: 9 September 1689
- Burial place: Great Packington, Warwickshire
- Known for: Escape of Charles II
- Spouse: Sir Clement Fisher, 2nd Baronet

Jane Lane (c. 1626 – 9 September 1689) played a role in the escape of Charles II after the Battle of Worcester in 1651. She rode with Charles, who was disguised as her servant, from Staffordshire to Somerset.

== Origins ==
Jane was the daughter of Thomas Lane and Anne Bagot of the parish of Bentley and Hyde (near Walsall). Her parents had married at Blithfield, Staffordshire, in 1608. Their son, John, was born on 8 April 1609, the first of what were to be four sons and five daughters.

There are several early christening dates for a Jane Lane in the International Genealogical Index which have been estimated by contributors, most probably based on a spurious date for her marriage. However she was known as 'Jane Lane' in 1651 and so was unmarried at that date.

Known birth (and other) dates for Jane Lane's siblings are:

- John (8 April 1609 – 31 August 1667) a colonel in the Royalist army and, after the Restoration, MP for Lichfield
- Walter Lane—born May 1611
- William Lane—baptised 7 August 1625
- Richard Lane—youngest son (became a Groom of the Bedchamber)
- Withy Lane (married John Petre). Withy is stated in the book Flight of the King (Alan Fea, 1908, Methuen) as being the eldest daughter of the family.
- Jane Lane
- Anne Lane (married Edward Birch)
- Mary Lane—born 1619 (married Edward Nicholas)
- Elizabeth Lane

In May 1644 her family home Bentley Hall was looted by parliamentary forces during the Civil War.

== The ride to Bristol with Charles II ==
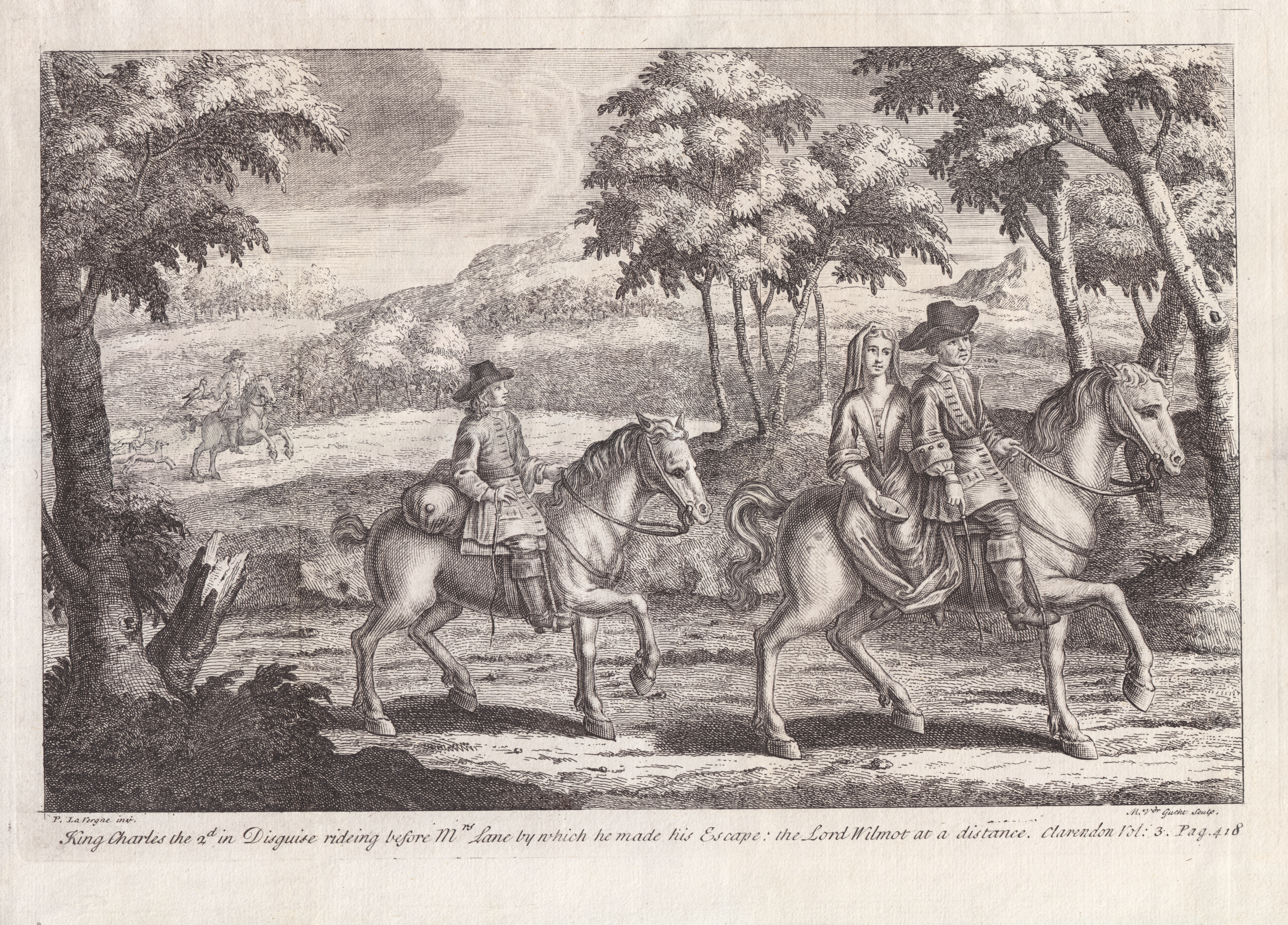
"King Charles the 2^{d} in Disguise rideing before M^{rs} Lane by which he made his Escape; the Lord Wilmot at a distance." from Clarendon's History of the Rebellion (1731 reprint)

Following defeat at the Battle of Worcester on 3 September 1651, Charles II escaped and headed north into Shropshire and Staffordshire with several companions including Lord Derby and Henry, Lord Wilmot. A reward of £1000 was offered for the capture of the King. It is likely that the King and anyone helping him would have been executed for treason, if caught. The King had a distinctive appearance: very dark and six feet two inches tall (1.88 m). Furthermore, there were cavalry patrols tasked with finding the King. At this time it was illegal for Catholics to travel more than five miles away from their homes without a pass from the sheriff of the county. Helping the King would therefore be hazardous.

Wilmot had gone to Bentley Hall in Staffordshire, the home of Colonel John Lane, who had been an officer in the Royalist Army since 1642. His sister was Jane Lane. She was described by John Evelyn as "an acute wit", "an excellent disputant" though "no beauty". Wilmot learned that Jane had obtained a permit from the military for herself and a servant to travel to the seaport of Bristol, to visit a relation, Ellen Norton, who was having a baby. Lord Wilmot saw the opportunity of escaping through Bristol in the guise of the servant, since no lady would travel alone. On learning of the King's failure to reach Wales, Wilmot decided that the King should take advantage of the military pass and travel to Bristol as Jane Lane's servant, and then find a ship to take him to France.

When the King reached Bentley Hall early on 10 September 1651, he was dressed as a tenant farmer's son and adopted the alias ‘William Jackson’ for the next part of his journey. The party then set out, Charles riding the same horse as Jane Lane. They were accompanied by Withy Petre (Jane Lane's sister), her husband John Petre, and Henry Lascelles, another related Royalist officer.

Lord Wilmot refused to travel in disguise; he rode openly half a mile ahead of the party and if challenged he said he would claim to be out hunting. This was a risky yet useful decoy. The party rode through Rowley Regis then Quinton to Bromsgrove. When they arrived at Bromsgrove they found that the horse ridden by Charles and Lane had lost a shoe. The King, playing the role of servant, took the horse to a blacksmith.

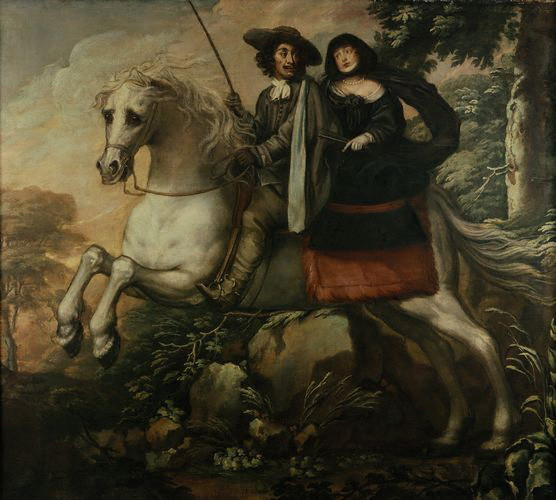
"King Charles II and Jane Lane riding to Bristol" by Isaac Fuller

The King when he later told his story to Samuel Pepys and others said,

As I was holding my horse's foot, I asked the smith what news. He told me that there was no news that he knew of, since the good news of the beating the rogues of the Scots. I asked him whether there was none of the English taken that joined with the Scots, He answered he did not hear if that rogue, Charles Stuart, were taken; but some of the others, he said, were taken. I told him that if that rogue were taken, he deserved to be hanged more than all the rest, for bringing in the Scots. Upon which he said I spoke like an honest man; and so we parted.

The party reached Wootton Wawen where cavalry had gathered outside the inn. Here John and Withy Petre went ahead of the party. The King, Lane and Henry Lascelles with great coolness rode through the troops. The party then continued through Stratford-upon-Avon, and on to Long Marston where they spent the night of 10 September at the house of John Tomes, another relation of Lane.

On Thursday 11 September, they continued through Chipping Campden and then to Cirencester, where it is said they spent the night of 11 September at the Crown Inn. The next morning they travelled on to Chipping Sodbury and then to Bristol, arriving at Abbots Leigh on the evening of 12 September. They stayed at the home of Mr and Mrs George Norton, who were also Lane's friends. The Nortons were unaware of the King's identity during his three-day stay at Abbots Leigh. While staying there Charles deflected suspicion by asking a servant, who had been in the King's personal guard at the Battle of Worcester, to describe the King's appearance and clothing at the battle. The man looked at Charles and said, "The King was at least three fingers taller than [you]."

== Bristol to Trent ==
Attempts were made to find a ship from Bristol to France but without success. Charles and Wilmot therefore decided to try the south coast.

Ellen Norton had a miscarriage and felt that Lane should stay. Consequently, Lane had to counterfeit a letter apparently calling her back to Bentley so that she could leave with the King.

On the morning of 16 September Charles and Lane set out and reached the Manor House, Castle Cary. The next day they reached Trent in Somerset (now in Dorset). They stayed at Trent House, the home of Colonel Francis Wyndham, another Royalist officer. The King spent the next few days hiding at Trent whilst Wyndham and Wilmot attempted to find a ship from Lyme Regis or Weymouth. While at Trent, the King witnessed the local villagers celebrating, believing that he had been killed at Worcester. On 18 September Jane Lane and Lascelles returned home.

== Lane's exile ==
However, Lane heard on 14 October that the Council of State had been told she had helped with the escape. Before Bentley Hall was searched, she left, walking to Yarmouth while posing as a "country wench", and travelled to France. She arrived in Paris in December 1651 and was welcomed by the Court in exile. She developed a strong friendship with the King and with Queen Henrietta Maria. The King held her in great esteem, so much so that John Fisher reported a rumour had circulated that she was the King's mistress. Even the King's sister, Mary, in a letter from Holland referred to Jane as the King's 'wife'.

In 1652, Charles arranged for Lane to become a lady-in-waiting for his sister Princess Mary in Holland. Throughout his exile Charles carried on affectionate correspondence with Jane Lane and often said that he wished he could help her more. Lane received the following letter from Charles in reply to a letter in which she had said he had probably forgotten her by now:

1652 the last of June

Mrs. Lane, I did not thinke I should ever have begun a letter to you in [chiding?] but you give me so just cause by telling me you feare you are wearing out of [my?] memory that I cannot chuse but tell you I take it very unkindly that after [all?] the obligations I have to you 'tis possible for you to suspect I can ever [be so?] wanting to myselfe as not to remember them on all occasions to your advan[tage?], which I assure you, I shall and hope before long I shall have it in my power to give you testimonyes of my kindnesse to you which I desire. I am very [sorry?] to hear that your father and brother are in prison, but I hope it is of no [other?] score than the general claping of all persons who wish me well and I am the more sorry for it. Now it hath hindered you from coming along with my [sister?] that I might have assured you myself how truly I am

Your Most affectionate friend, For Mrs. Lane

Charles R.

== Restoration ==
At the Restoration Lane returned to England. Charles was then able to give her a pension of £1000 per year and many gifts, including portraits of the King and a lock of his hair. Parliament also voted her £1000 to buy a jewel to commemorate her service. Her courageous loyalty earned for her family the right to add the three Lions of England to their coat of arms. (In later years the lions exempted the Lane family from a tax on coats of arms, as the royal arms were exempt.)

She was married to Sir Clement Fisher, 2nd Baronet of Packington Hall, Warwickshire (1613–1683), on 8 December 1663 by Gilbert Sheldon, Archbishop of Canterbury. Fisher had served under Jane's brother, John Lane, as a captain in the First Civil War. There were no children from the marriage.

In later life she lived extravagantly. There were arrears of £6,500 in the payment of her pension and she was deeply in debt. Lady Fisher died at Packington Old Hall, between Birmingham and Coventry, on 9 September 1689 and was buried at Packington. Because of her debts, her estate was only £10. There is a memorial to Jane and her parents in St Peter's Collegiate Church, Wolverhampton.

Several paintings of Lane exist including one in the collection of the National Portrait Gallery of the King and Jane Lane on a horse (NPG 5251). It was part of a romanticised series about the escape painted by Isaac Fuller shortly after the Restoration.

== In fiction ==
- Jane Lane is the subject of the 2012 novel The King's Mistress by Gillian Bagwell (US title The September Queen).
- Lane plays a significant part in Georgette Heyer's novel, Royal Escape, pub. 1938.
- Jane Lane appears in an episode describing Charles's II escape in Charlotte Mary Yonge's Under the Storm (1888).
