= Henry Marlar =

15th-century English politician

Henry Marlar was the member of Parliament for Coventry in 1495. He was also mayor in 1496.
