= Stavely =

- Town
- Town of Stavely
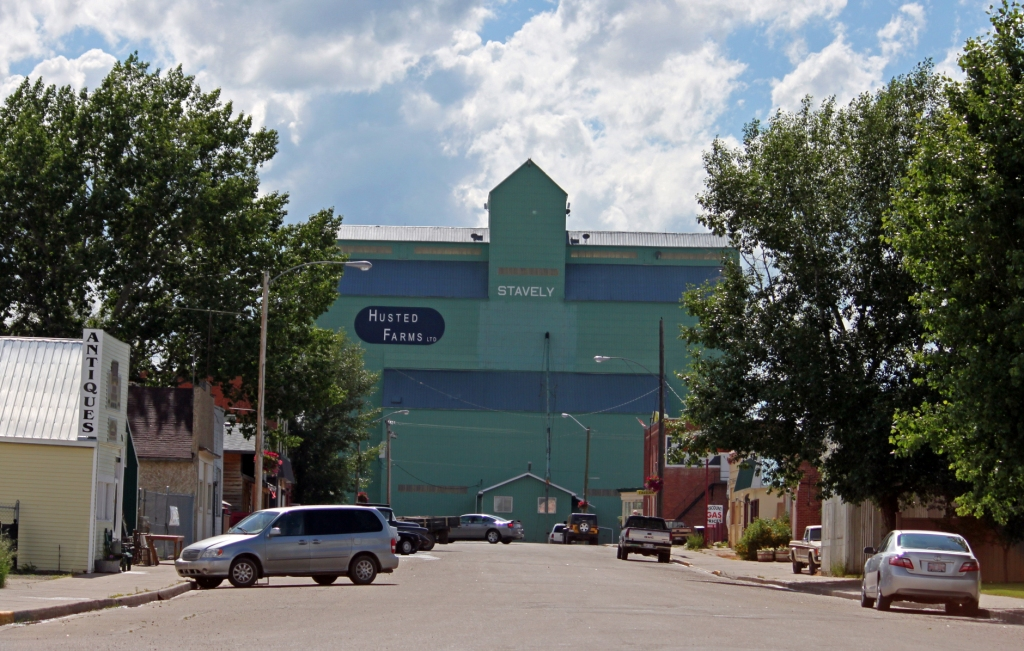
- View down Main Street at Stavely's last remaining grain elevator, June 2010
- Motto: In the Heart of Farming and Ranching
- Location of Stavely in Alberta
- Coordinates: 50°09′54″N 113°38′44″W
- Country: Canada
- Province: Alberta
- Region: Southern Alberta
- Census division: 3
- Municipal district: Municipal District of Willow Creek No. 26
- Incorporated
  - Village: October 16, 1903
  - Town: May 25, 1912

Government
  - Mayor: Ramona Whittingham
  - Governing body: Stavely Town Council: Janice Binmore; Dale Gugala; Tim Martin; Don Norby; Ramona Whittingham; Mike Varey

Area (2021)
  - Land: 1.78 km^{2} (0.69 sq mi)
- Elevation: 1,044 m (3,425 ft)

Population (2021)
  - Total: 544
  - Density: 305.3/km^{2} (791/sq mi)
- Time zone: UTC−06:00 (Alberta Time)
- Postal code: T0L 1Z0
- Area codes: +1-403, +1-587
- Highways: Highway 2 Highway 527
- Waterways: Willow Creek
- Website: Official website

Stavely is a town in southern Alberta, Canada. It is located 110 kilometres (68 mi) south of Calgary on Highway 2 and 16 km (9.9 mi) east of Willow Creek Provincial Park.

== History ==
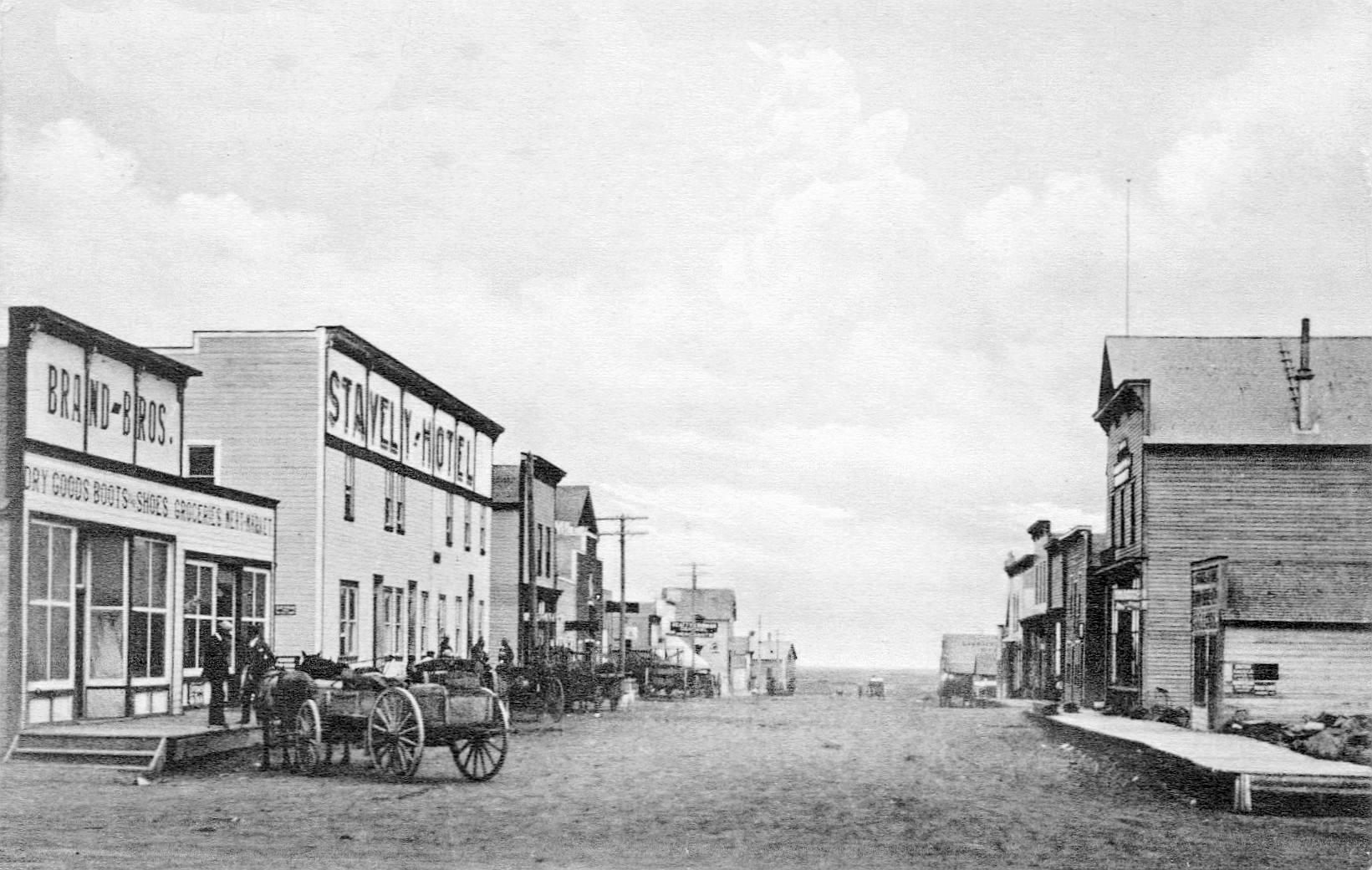
Stavely, 1910

Stavely was named for Alexander Staveley Hill, managing director of the Oxley Ranching Company that was founded in 1882 by John R Craig on 100,000 acres of grazing rights.

The Canadian Pacific Railway once ran through the town. Its closure led to the removal of all but one of Stavely's grain elevators.

== Demographics ==
In the 2021 Census of Population conducted by Statistics Canada, the Town of Stavely had a population of 544 living in 269 of its 287 total private dwellings, a change of 0.6% from its 2016 population of 541. With a land area of 1.78 km^{2} (0.69 sq mi), it had a population density of 305.6/km^{2} (791.5/sq mi) in 2021.

In the 2016 Census of Population conducted by Statistics Canada, the Town of Stavely recorded a population of 541 living in 265 of its 290 total private dwellings, a 7.1% change from its 2011 population of 505. With a land area of 1.83 km^{2} (0.71 sq mi), it had a population density of 295.6/km^{2} (765.7/sq mi) in 2016.

== Arts and culture ==
Stavely is known as the home of the Stavely Indoor Rodeo. Founded in 1929, it is the world's first indoor rodeo. In 1996 the miniseries In Cold Blood was filmed in Stavely. In 2012 the community celebrated its 100th birthday.

== Attractions ==
The town has a 9-hole golf course named the Stavely Golf Club. It was one of the few remaining sand green golf courses in Canada until the sand greens were recently converted to artificial greens. Other recreation venues and facilities include an arena, archery lanes, a recreational vehicle campground, a ball diamond, and parks. Stavely is also home to a museum.

The Pine Coulee Reservoir, a popular place for recreation and camping, is 5 km (3.1 mi) west of Stavely. Clear Lake recreation area (camping/water sports) is located 19 km east of Stavely. Willow Creek Municipal Park (campground) is located 16 km west of Stavely.

== Education ==
Stavely's only school, Stavely Elementary School, teaches local children from Kindergarten through Grade 6. The school was renovated in 2002, and its school motto is Every Child Shines. Prior to the 2002 renovation, grades 7-9 students attended A. J. Nowicki Jr. High School, which has been demolished. The Stavely Education Foundation has been established to assist former students with the costs of post-secondary education.

== Community services ==
The following is a list of the Town of Stavely's volunteer community organizations and service groups.

- B.P.O.Elks Lodge #112
- O.O.R.P. Lodge #99
- Beaver I.O.O.F. Lodge #27
- Masonic Lodge
- Museum Society of Stavely & District
- Silverleaf Rebekah Lodge #99
- Stavely & District Agricultural Society
- Stavely & District Youth Society
- Stavely Archery Lane
- Glen Keeley Memorial Bull Riding Committee
- Stavely Community Chest
- Stavely Community Hall Board

- Stavely Figure Skating Club
- Stavely Golden Age Centre
- Stavely Golf Club
- Stavely Indoor Pro Rodeo Committee
- Stavely Local Initiatives
- Stavely Minor Hockey
- Stavely Municipal Library
- Stavely Pheasant Derby
- Stavely Stampeders 4-H Light Horse Club
- Stavely/Parkland 4-H Beef Club
- United Church Women
- Willow Creek Cowboy Poetry & Music Society
- Stavely Fire Department

== See also ==
- List of communities in Alberta
- List of towns in Alberta
