= Robert Kelle =

13th-century English politician

Robert Kelle was the member of Parliament for Coventry in 1298. He was a merchant.
