= Lawrence de Schepey =

14th-century English politician

Lawrence de Schepey was the member of Parliament for Coventry in 1301. He was a citizen of Coventry.
