= Robert Onley =

15th-century English politician

Sir Robert Onley was the member of Parliament for Coventry in 1485. He was also mayor twice in the 1480s. He was a woolman.
