= Thomas Ballard (MP for Coventry) =

14th-century English politician

Thomas Ballard was the member of Parliament for Coventry in 1301. He was a citizen of Coventry.
