= William Strickland (Conservative politician) =

Captain William Frederick Strickland (1 February 1880 – 29 November 1954) was a Conservative Member of Parliament (MP) representing Coventry, from 1931 to 1945.

Parliament of the United Kingdom
Preceded by Philip Noel-Baker	Member of Parliament for Coventry; 1931–1945	Constituency abolished
