= Alexander de Moubray =

14th-century English politician

Alexander de Moubray was the member of Parliament for Coventry in 1306. He was a city justice.
