= Alexander Staveley Hill =

British barrister and politician (1825–1905)

Hill in 1895.

Alexander Staveley Hill, PC, KC, JP, DL (21 May 1825 – 25 June 1905) was a British barrister and Conservative Party politician. He was a Member of Parliament (MP) from 1868 to 1900, representing Coventry, Staffordshire West and Kingswinford.

== Biography ==
Hill was born in Wolverhampton, the son of Henry Hill, a banker, and his wife Anne Staveley. He was educated at King Edward's School, Birmingham and Exeter College, Oxford. He was called to the bar by the Inner Temple in 1851 and joined the Oxford circuit, of which he became the leader. He also acquired a large practice at the parliamentary bar, which he had to relinquish upon entering the House of Commons. He became a Queen's Counsel in 1868.

Hill represented Coventry from 1868 to 1874, West Staffordshire from 1874 to 1885 and Kingswinford from 1885 to 1900. He also served as Judge Advocate of the Fleet.

He lived at Kensington and at Oxley Manor, Bushbury, Staffordshire, where he was a JP and Deputy Lieutenant of the county. In 1880 he and his wife funded a school and chapel at Bushbury.

During the years 1881-1884 Hill went on annual visits to western Canada and published an account of his travels, From Home to Home: Autumn Wanderings in the Northwest in the Years 1881-1884 (1885). The town of Stavely, Alberta was named after him.

He married Katherine Ponsonby and they had a son, Henry Staveley-Hill, who followed his father into law and politics. After Katherine died Hill married again, to Mary Frances Baird, daughter of Francis Baird of St Petersburg.

Parliament of the United Kingdom
Preceded by Samuel Carter and Henry Eaton	Member of Parliament for Coventry; 1868–1874; With: Henry Eaton	Succeeded by Sir Henry Jackson and Henry Eaton
Preceded by Sir Smith Child and Francis Monckton	Member of Parliament for Staffordshire West; 1874–1885; With: Francis Monckton	Succeeded by Hamar Bass
New constituency	Member of Parliament for Kingswinford; 1885–1900	Succeeded by William George Webb
