= Edward Lapworth =

English physician and poet

Edward Lapworth (1574–1636) was an English physician and Latin poet, and the first Sedleian reader at the University of Oxford.

== Life ==
Lapworth was a native of Warwickshire; his father was physician to Henry Berkeley. He was admitted B.A. at St Alban Hall, Oxford on 25 October 1592, and M.A. 30 June 1595. From 1598 to 1610 he was Master of Magdalen College School.

As a member of Magdalen College Lapworth supplicated for the degree of M.B. and for licence to practise medicine 1 March 1602–3. He was licensed on 3 June 1605, and was admitted M.B. and M.D. on 20 June 1611.

Lapworth was moderator in vesperiis in medicine in 1605 and 1611, and respondent in natural philosophy on James I's visit to Oxford in 1605. In July 1611 he had permission to be absent from congregation in order that he might attend to his medical practice. In 1617 and 1619 he seems to have been in practice at Faversham, Kent.

In 1618 Lapworth was designated first Sedleian reader in natural philosophy under the will of the founder, William Sedley, even though the bequest did not take effect till 1621; and on 9 August 1619 was appointed Linacre physic lecturer. From this time onwards he resided part of the year in Oxford. In the summer he practised usually at Bath, Somerset; and died there 23 May 1636, having resigned his Oxford lectureship the previous year. He was buried in Bath Abbey.

== Works ==
Lapworth was a scholarly man who wrote occasional verse, and was praised by John Davies of Hereford. One known event with songs by him was the 1613 marriage of Sir Robert Coke to Theophila Berkeley, daughter of Sir Thomas Berkeley.

Verses by Lapworth occur in a number of books, and John Rouse Bloxam catalogued 13. Besides royal occasions, they commemorate William, son of Arthur Grey, 14th Baron Grey de Wilton. He contributed to Joshua Sylvester's Du Bartas, his Devine Weekes and Workes, 1605, and the treatise of Edward Jorden on Naturall Bathes and Minerall Waters.

== Family ==
Lapworth married, first, Mary Coxhead, who was buried 2 January 1621; and, secondly, Margery, daughter of Sir George Snigg and widow of George Chaldecot of Quarlstone. He had a son, Michael, who matriculated at Magdalen College in 1621, aged 17; and a daughter, Anne, who was his heiress, and mother of William Joyner.

== Notes ==
Attribution

This article incorporates text from a publication now in the public domain: Lee, Sidney, ed. (1892). "Lapworth, Edward". Dictionary of National Biography. Vol. 32. London: Smith, Elder & Co.
