= David Marshall Mason =

Scottish politician (1865–1945)

David Marshall Mason

David Marshall Mason (7 December 1865 – 19 March 1945) was a Scottish Liberal politician, banker and businessman.

== Family and education ==
Mason was born at Campsie, near Glasgow, the eldest son of Stephen Mason, himself a Liberal MP and Martha Marshall. He was educated at Partick Academy and Kelvinside Academy, Glasgow, Craigmount in Edinburgh and then at Glasgow University. He also studied privately in Germany. He married Mary Crouse of Akron, Ohio who was the daughter of the Hon. George W. Crouse, formerly a Republican Member of Congress. They had two sons and five daughters.

== Business interests ==
Mason went into banking, becoming an Associate of the Institute of Bankers. He was described by The Times newspaper in 1910 as having banking and railways interests. Mason acquired a reputation as an expert on the economy, financial and trading questions. He was a founder member of chairman of the Executive Committee of the Sound Currency Association.

== Political career ==
Mason first contested a Parliamentary seat for the Liberals at Glasgow, Tradeston at the 1906 general election where he also stood, again unsuccessfully, in January 1910. He was however returned in the December 1910 election as MP for Coventry when he gained the seat from the sitting Conservative MP, John Kenneth Foster. He held Coventry until 1918. Mason tended to be an opponent of the coalition government during the First World War pressing in Parliament for the government to explore opportunities for peacemaking and supporting votes which placed him in 'the pacifist minority'. He was often described as an Independent or Independent Liberal in the press and stood as an Independent at the 1918 general election. The coalition coupon was given to Edward Manville, a Conservative who was the victor in a contest involving five candidates. Like other Liberal MPs who had taken an unpopular stance over aspects of war policy, Mason was rejected by the electorate, coming fifth of the five candidates in the poll.

Mason tried to return to Parliament at each of the next three general elections for the Romford Division of Essex, and then for Barnstaple in North Devon at the 1929 general election .

== Radical, centrist or right-wing? ==
Described as being on the Radical wing of the Liberal party especially in relation to foreign policy, Mason played a leading role in condemning Italian atrocities in Tripolitania during the war between Italy and Turkey in 1911 and urging British government intervention. Attempting to rally an effective protest Mason said the Italian invasion had provoked an outburst of indignation from the friends of freedom and foes of aggression' in Britain. However another historian has called Mason a 'Liberal Centrist' typical of the sort of candidates being adopted by Liberal Associations in the hope of attracting working class votes whilst maintaining the support of traditional Liberals.

Mason was certainly associated with radical causes. He was a strong proponent of Irish Home Rule and supporter of John Redmond. He was connected to the Peace Society and opposed greater spending on arms and armaments and was a member of a deputation to Liberal prime minister H H Asquith to advise him of the uneasiness of the Parliamentary Liberal Party regarding increasing spending on the Navy. All this, and his criticisms of the government got him into trouble with Coventry Liberal Association who announced in January 1914 that they would be finding a new candidate for the next election In response Mason said he would stand as an Independent Liberal in opposition to the official candidate. He was a member of the Liberal Foreign Affairs Committee, a private backbench group set up in December 1911. This was an essentially radical organisation and critical of the direction and conduct of the foreign policy of Sir Edward Grey. In July 1914, a dozen or so of the group, including Mason met and passed a resolution urging British neutrality in the emerging crisis. Mason was a signatory to the letter which the group sent to Grey covering the text of the resolution and urging him to use the government's good offices to secure peace.

Mason was an opponent of the Bill introducing conscription in 1916, being one of one 34 Liberal MPs to vote against it. He was also in favour of votes for women and was identified by Sylvia Pankhurst as a fervent supporter of the Suffragette cause inside and outside Parliament.

However it is clear that Mason was far more conservative on issues surrounding the economy. He kept a high political profile during the 1920s with his chairmanship of the Sound Currency Association and many letters to the Times newspaper on various aspects of the economy, trade and foreign policy . He was described as a ‘notorious advocate of a return to the gold standard’. However he may have been moving in that direction far earlier as he was re-elected to Parliament at the 1931 general election as a Liberal candidate in East Edinburgh promising to support National Government of Ramsay MacDonald, the official position of the Liberal Party, and defeating the sitting Labour MP, Drummond Shiels. At this election, the Conservative candidate J Carmont had withdrawn in favour of Mason because he pledged support to the government but the honeymoon with the Unionists did not last and Mason got into trouble with the local Unionist association for voting against the government just a few weeks later. By the time of the 1935 general election he had gone into opposition with his Liberal colleagues, and so faced a Unionist opponent. However the seat was won back by Labour and Mason finished bottom of the poll. That year he joined the Anglo-German Fellowship.

== Death ==
Mason died on 19 March 1945 in a Nursing home in Malvern in Worcestershire, aged 79.

== Publications ==
- Macedonia and Great Britain's Responsibility; T Fisher Unwin, 1903
- Six Years of Politics, 1910–1916; J M Murray, 1917
- National Currency and Finance Reform; Loxley Bros. 1923
- Monetary Policy, 1914–1928; M Hopkinson & Co, 1928
- National Finance and the Future of Gold; National Liberal Club, 1937
- Stabilization of the Currency: its bearing on foreign trade; Industrial Publications, 1937

Parliament of the United Kingdom
Preceded by Kenneth Foster	Member of Parliament for Coventry; 1910–1918	Succeeded by Edward Manville
Preceded by Drummond Shiels	Member of Parliament for Edinburgh East; 1931–1935	Succeeded by Frederick Pethick-Lawrence
