= John Wildegryse =

15th-century English politician

John Wildegryse was the member of Parliament for Coventry in 1472-75 and 1478. He was also mayor in 1460. He was a draper.
