= Henry Paterson Gisborne =

British Solicitor and Liberal Party politician

Henry Paterson Gisborne JP (11 December 1888 – 8 August 1953), was a prominent British Solicitor and Liberal Party politician.

== Background ==
He married Katherine Helen Noble, who died in 1925. In 1928 he married Dorothy Mary Pratt. They had two daughters.

== Professional career ==
Gisborne was a solicitor and senior partner of Lewis & Lewis and Gisborne & Co., 10, 11, and 12 Ely Place, EC1. During World War One he served as a lieutenant in the Duke of Wellington’s (West Riding) Regiment. He was a member of the literary staff of 'International Law Notes'. He was the prime mover in the Law Society amalgamation of the two branches of the legal profession.

== Political career ==
Gisborne was Liberal candidate for the Coventry division of Warwickshire at the 1923 General Election. The Liberals had previously lost Coventry to the Coalition in 1918 and at the 1922 election they had come third. The election in 1923 produced a very close three-way result; Gisborne finished third but only 430 votes behind the winning Labour candidate. He fought Coventry again in 1924, a bad election for the Liberal Party, when his vote dropped. Despite this, he was able to secure the candidacy for a better seat for the Liberals. He was Liberal candidate for the Scarborough and Whitby division of Yorkshire at the 1929 General Election. This was a Unionist constituency where Labour always came a poor third, while Liberal and Unionist battled it out. He was able to increase the Liberal vote share, but the Unionist held on by over 3,000 votes. He did not stand for parliament again. He served as a Justice of the Peace in London.

=== Electoral record ===
General Election 1923: Coventry
Party	Candidate	Votes	%	±%
Labour	A. A. Purcell	16,346	34.2	+1.1
Unionist	Edward Manville	15,726	32.9	−9.7
Liberal	Henry Paterson Gisborne	15,716	32.9	+8.6
Majority		620	1.3	10.8
Turnout			77.1	−3.7
Labour gain from Unionist		Swing	+5.4	

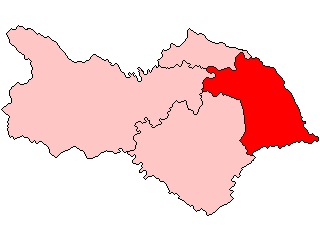
Scarborough & Whitby in North Yorkshire 1929

General Election 1929: Scarborough and Whitby
Party	Candidate	Votes	%	±%
Unionist	Sidney Herbert	20,710	48.3	−9.2
Liberal	Henry Paterson Gisborne	17,544	40.9	+6.7
Labour	H D Rowntree	4,645	10.8	+2.5
Majority		3,166	7.4	−15.9
Turnout			79.7	+0.8
Unionist hold		Swing	-8.0	
