= John Lane of Bentley =

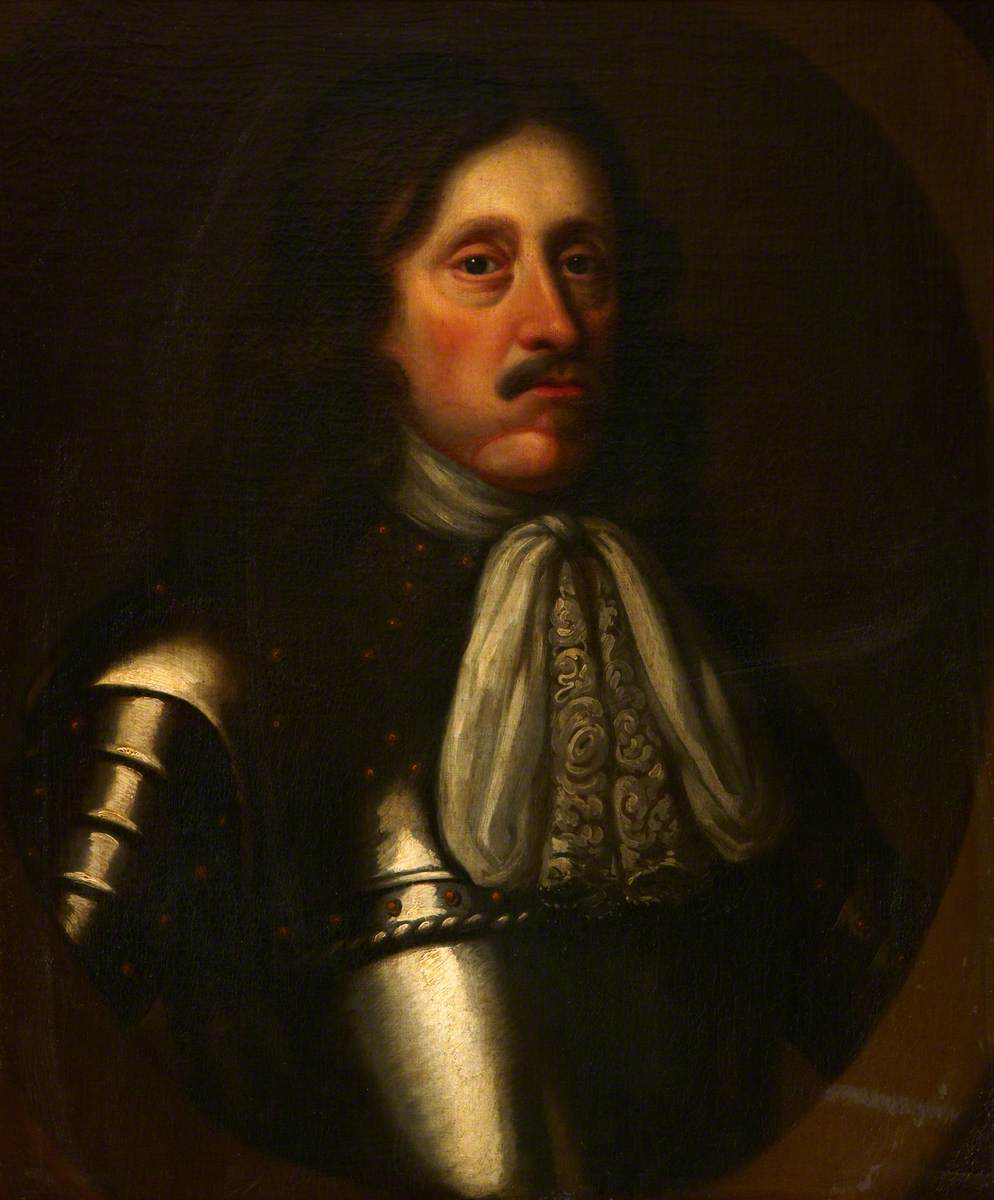

Colonel John Lane of Bentley (1609 – 31 August 1667) was the Member of Parliament for Lichfield, Staffordshire from 1661 to 1667. A Royalist colonel, he had given refuge to King Charles II at his Bentley estate following the Royalist defeat in 1651 at the Battle of Worcester, during the English Civil War. Charles left Bentley in the guise of the servant of his sister Jane Lane who was travelling to Bristol (see Escape of Charles II ).

He was appointed MP shortly after the Restoration of the Monarchy. He died in 1667 and was succeeded by Richard Dyott.
