= Charles James Murray =

British politician

- Murray in 1880

Member of Parliament for Coventry
- In office 1895–1906
- Preceded by: William Ballantine
- Succeeded by: A. E. W. Mason

Member of Parliament for Hastings
- In office 1880–1883 Serving with Thomas Brassey
- Preceded by: Ughtred Kay-Shuttleworth; Thomas Brassey
- Succeeded by: Thomas Brassey; Henry Bret Ince

Personal details
- Born: 29 November 1851 Cairo, Egypt
- Died: 25 September 1929 (aged 77)
- Party: Conservative
- Spouse: Lady Anne Francesca Wilhelmina Finch (m. 1875)
- Relations: George Murray, 5th Earl of Dunmore (grandfather); James Wadsworth (grandfather)
- Children: 3
- Parent(s): Sir Charles Augustus Murray; Elise Wadsworth
- Awards: Order of Agricultural Merit

Charles James Murray (29 November 1851 – 25 September 1929) was a British Conservative Party politician and diplomat.

== Early life ==
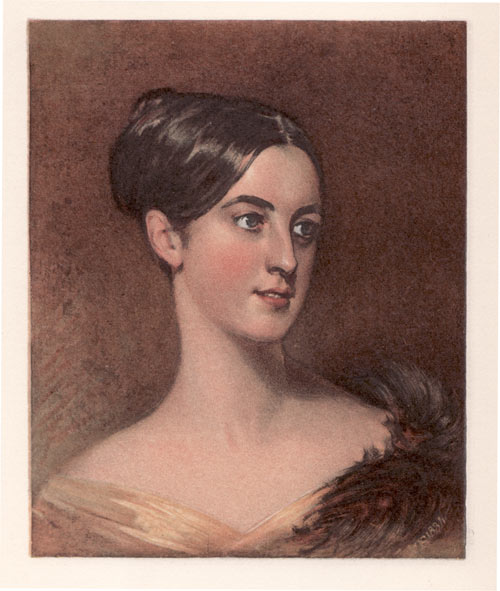
1834 portrait of his mother, Elise, by Thomas Sully.

He was the son of The Hon. Sir Charles Augustus Murray (son of George Murray, 5th Earl of Dunmore, and maternal grandson of Archibald Hamilton, 9th Duke of Hamilton) and his American born wife Elizabeth "Elise" Wadsworth, daughter of prominent landowner and businessman James Wadsworth. His parents met while his father was spending several years travelling across Europe and America between 1835 and 1838. His father returned to England in 1838 where his father obtained the position of Master of the Household in the Court of the young Queen Victoria. After being removed from the positions in the Household reforms initiated by Albert, Prince Consort, his father became a diplomat in Naples followed by consul-general in Egypt in 1846. His parents married in December 1850 during one of his father's visits to Scotland. While in Cairo, his mother died after giving birth to him. His father later served as Minister to the Swiss Confederation, and Envoy to the Shah of Persia and the King of Saxony. In 1862, his father remarried his first cousin once removed, Hon. Edith Susan Esther Fitzpatrick, daughter of John Fitzpatrick, 1st Baron Castletown). From this marriage, Charles had a much younger half-brother, Cecil Henry Alexander Murray.

== Career ==
Murray was elected as a Member of Parliament (MP) for Hastings in 1880, a position he resigned in 1883. He was elected Member of Parliament for Coventry in 1895 until he retired at the 1906 general election.

He later served as Third Secretary of the Diplomatic Service and was an officer in the Ross and Cromarty Mountain Battery, Royal Garrison Artillery. Between 1917 and 1918, he fought in the World War I and was awarded the Officier de Mérite Agricole.

== Personal life ==
On 9 August 1875, Murray was married to Lady Anne Francesca Wilhelmina Finch, a daughter of Heneage Finch, 6th Earl of Aylesford and Jane, only daughter and heiress of John Wightwick Knightley of Offchurch Bury. Her brothers, Heneage and Charles, both succeeded their father as the 7th and 8th Earl of Aylesford. Together, they lived at Lochcarron, Ross-shire in Scotland and were the parents of two sons, Alastair and Charles, and a daughter, Sybil. Sybil's daughter, Mary Willoughby, married Lt.-Gen. Sir Edward Dacre Howard-Vyse in 1940.

Murray died on 25 September 1929. His widow, Lady Anne, died on 10 January 1933.

Parliament of the United Kingdom
Preceded by Ughtred Kay-Shuttleworth; Thomas Brassey	Member of Parliament for Hastings; 1880 – 1883; With: Thomas Brassey	Succeeded by Thomas Brassey; Henry Bret Ince
Preceded by William Ballantine	Member of Parliament for Coventry; 1895 – 1906	Succeeded by A. E. W. Mason
