= Clobery Bromley =

British Tory politician

Clobery Bromley (1685 – 20 March 1711) was a British Tory politician, MP for Coventry 1710–1711.

Bromley was baptised on 16 December 1685, the oldest son of William Bromley MP, Speaker of the House of Commons, and his first wife Catherine Cloberry, daughter of Sir John Cloberry MP.

He was educated at Rugby School from 1694, and matriculated at Christ Church, Oxford in 1703.

Bromley was elected MP for Coventry in a by-election in December 1710 following the death of Robert Craven MP. He soon became a leading member of the Tory October Club, promoting "Country" policies which the Harley ministry opposed. This was embarrassing to his father Speaker Bromley, with chief minister Robert Harley complaining to him on several occasions about Clobery's behaviour.

On 19 March 1711 Bromley was elected a Commissioner of Public Accounts, taking fifth place in the ballot. By then, however, he had contracted smallpox. He died the following morning. The House of Commons adjourned until 26 March to permit Speaker Bromley a period of mourning; Jonathan Swift and others believed that the adjournment provided respite for the government, with Harley still absent, recovering from an assassination attempt by Antoine de Guiscard.

== Family ==
On 25 March 1708, he married Dorothy Bromley, daughter of William Bromley MP. They no children.

Parliament of Great Britain
Preceded by Robert Craven; Thomas Gery	Member of Parliament for Coventry; 1710–1711; With: Thomas Gery	Succeeded by Sir Christopher Hales, Bt; Thomas Gery
