= Richard de Stoke =

14th-century English politician

Richard de Stoke was the member of Parliament for Coventry in 1353. He was also several times mayor of the city.
