= Peter Baron (MP) =

14th-century English politician

Peter Baron was the member of Parliament for Coventry in 1305. He was a city justice.
