= Henry Sewall =

English merchant and politician

Coat of Arms of Henry Sewall

Henry Sewall (1544 – 1628) was an English merchant and politician who sat in the House of Commons from 1621 to 1622.

Sewall was the son of Sir William Sewall of Coventry and his wife Matilda Home. He became a linen draper in Coventry and acquired a great estate. In 1587 he became mayor of Coventry. He was mayor of Coventry again in 1606. In 1621, he was elected Member of Parliament for Coventry.

Sewall died in Coventry at the age of about 84 and was buried in the Draper's Chapel of St Michael's Church.

Sewall married Margaret Grazebrook, daughter of Avery Grazebrook, and had sons Henry and Richard. She made her will in May 1628 which was proved on 16 June 1632. Their great grandson was Samuel Sewall.

== See also ==
- Eben W. Graves, Descendants of Henry Sewall, 1576-1656 (Newbury Street Press, 2007)

Parliament of England
Preceded by Sampson Hopkins; Sir John Harington	Member of Parliament for Coventry; 1621–1622; With: Sampson Hopkins	Succeeded by Sir Edward Coke; Henry Harwell
