= Richard de Spicer =

English politician (1315)

Richard de Spicer (fl. 1315) was an English politician.

He was a member (MP) of the parliament of England for Coventry in 1315.
