= Nicholas de Hunt =

14th-century English politician

Nicholas de Hunt was the member of Parliament for Coventry in 1346. He was a merchant.
