= Edward Manville =

British electrical engineer and politician

Sir Edward Manville (formerly Mosely, 27 September 1862, Paddington – 17 March 1933, London) M.Inst.E.E., was a British consulting electrical engineer, industrialist and politician.

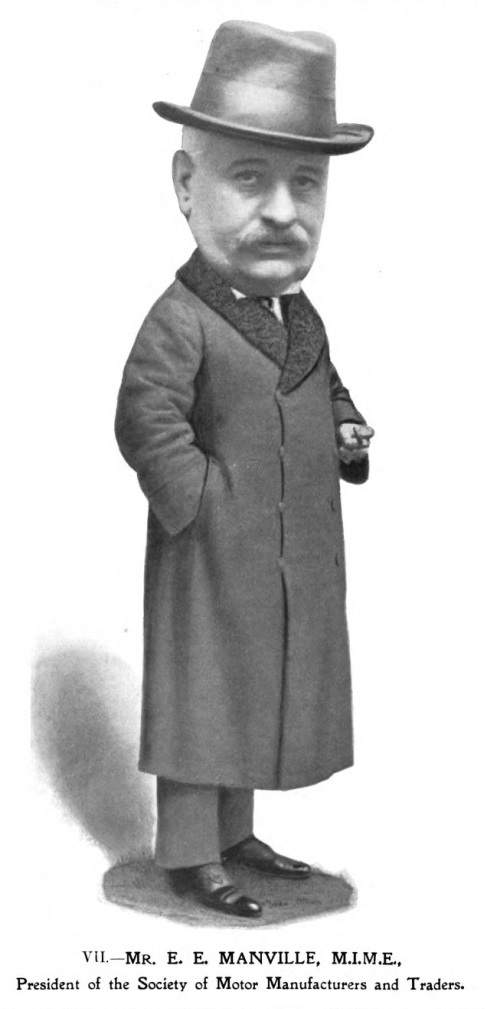
Edward Manville 1909

After a successful career as an electrical engineering consultant for local and foreign projects, Manville became chairman of Daimler Motor Company, later Daimler Company, from 1905 to 1933. He was also the chairman of several other companies, including the Baird Television Development Company throughout its existence from 1927 to 1928. He served as Member of Parliament for Coventry from 1918 to 1923.

== Early life ==
Manville was born in Paddington, London 27 September 1862 to London surgeon dentist Benjamin Ephraim Manville (formerly Mosely) and Adeline Hyam, who were Jews. He was educated at University College School, London and technical institutions.

== Electrical engineering ==
=== Early career and projects ===
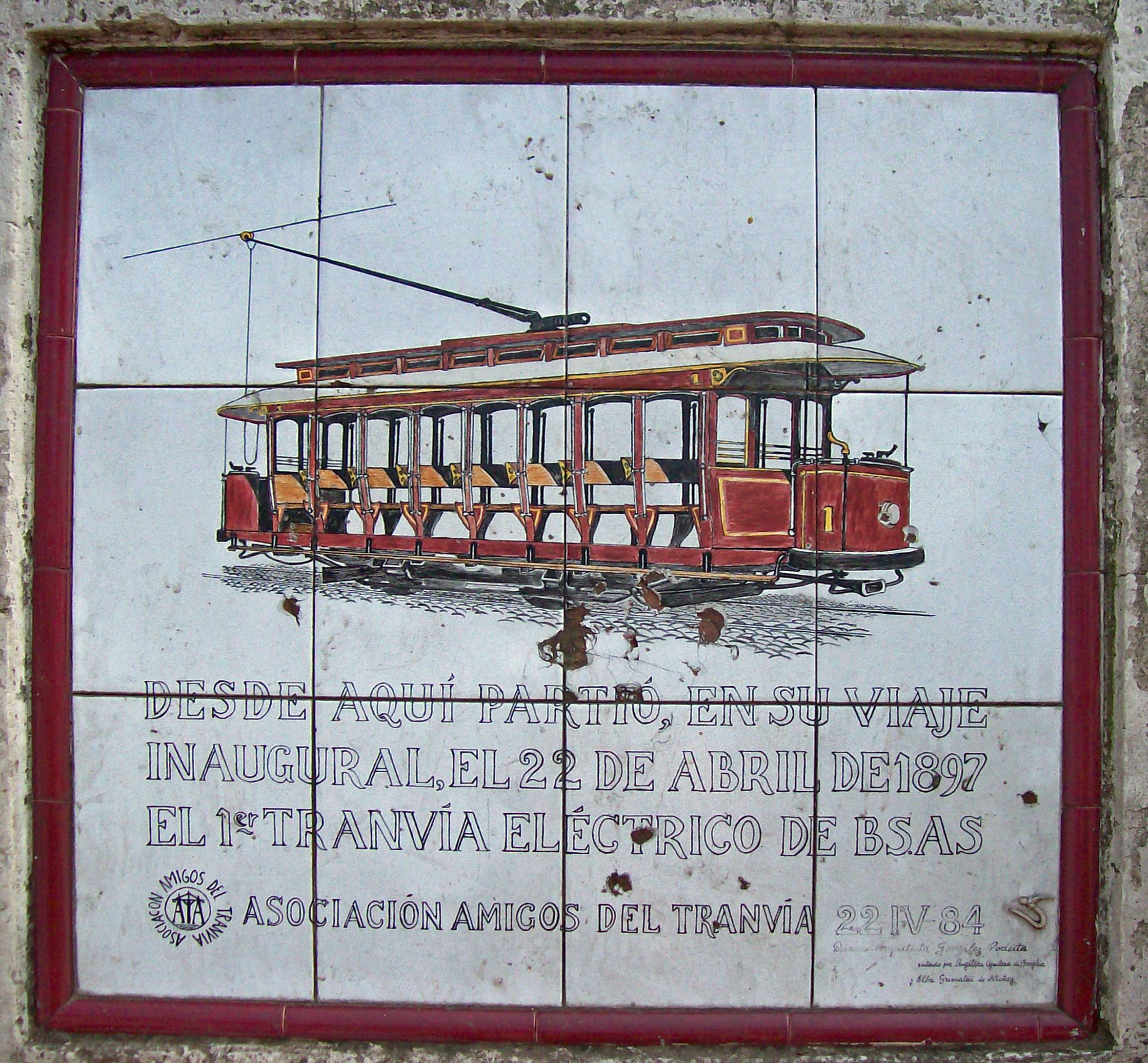
Memorial of first electric tram in Buenos Aires

Manville had been attracted to the practical study of electricity at a time of invention and discovery. He obtained an apprenticeship with the well-known electrical firm of Woodhouse and Rawson where he met Madgen, with whom he first set up a practice as consulting electrical engineers. He later joined the Westminster firm of Kincaid and Waller, and was responsible for many important undertakings, including the tram system of Buenos Aires, considered a model of its kind.

=== Association with Dudley Docker ===
Manville, a pioneer British of electro-technology, was a partner in a Westminster electrical engineering consultancy which advised on the electrification of the London, Brighton and South Coast Railway and Docker's Metropolitan Amalgamated Carriage and Wagon Company supplied the equipment. They both served on the board of directors of the Metropolitan Railway and they stuck together during the First World War, with Manville leading the Association of British Chambers of Commerce and Docker presiding over the Federation of British Industry.

== Motor industry ==
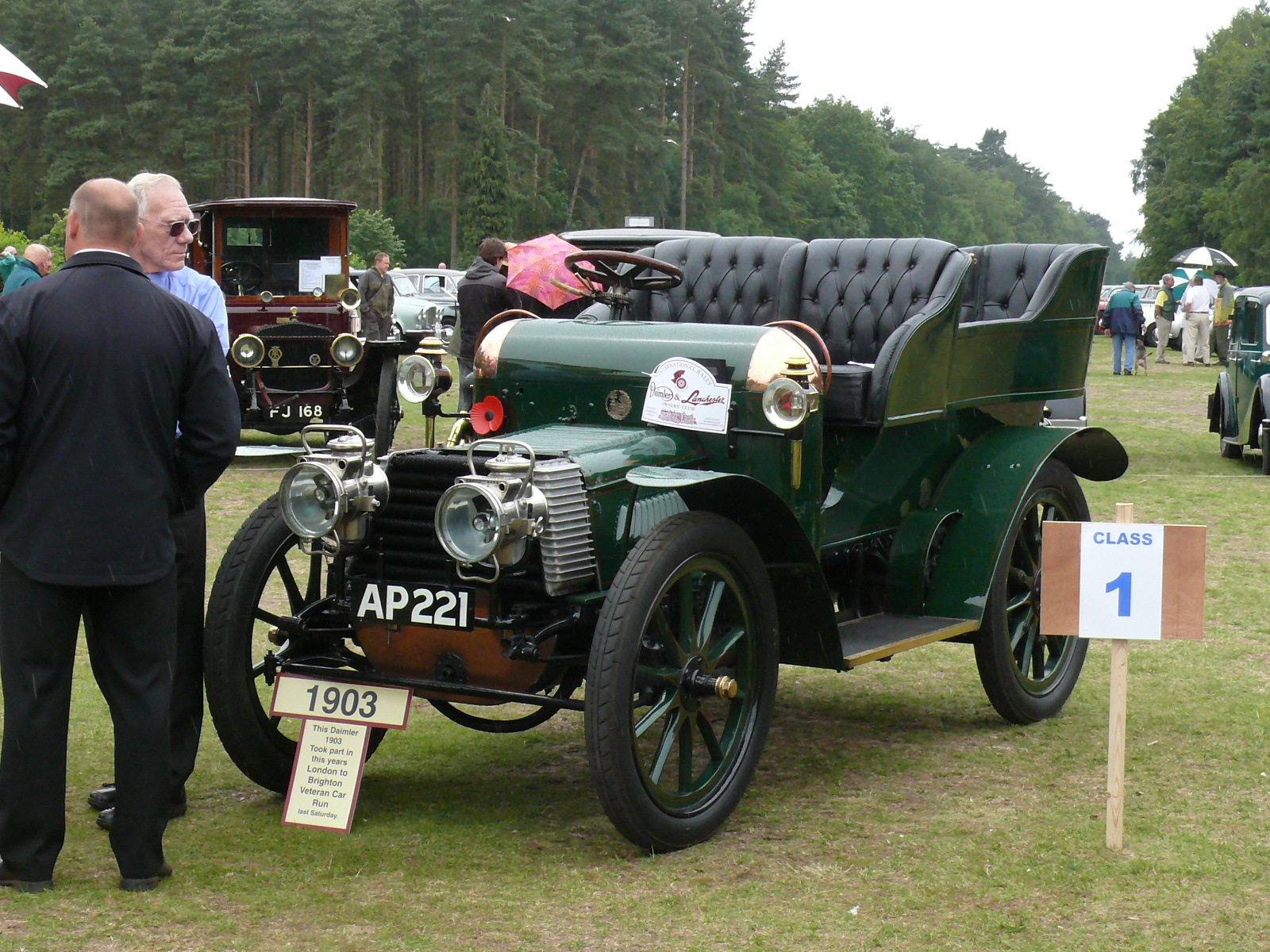
Daimler car 1903

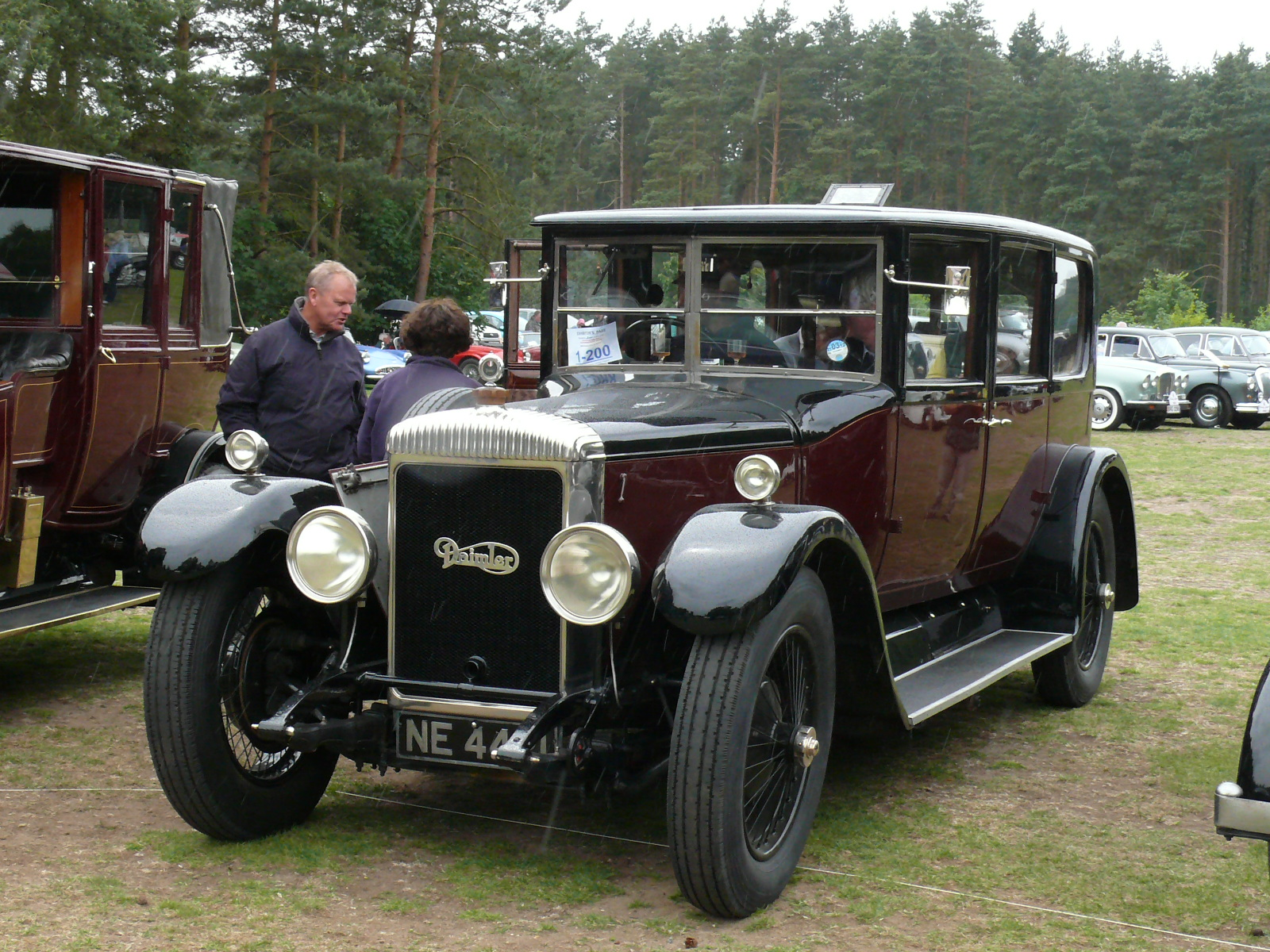
Daimler car 1925

In the automobile industry, as chairman of both Birmingham Small Arms Company and its wholly owned subsidiary The Daimler Company, he personally brought about the introduction of the Knight sleeve-valve engine and its acquisition by Daimler, and the incorporation of the fluid flywheel and epicyclic transmission system throughout Daimler's full range of vehicles. He shared his electrical engineering background with Daimler's managing director, American-born Percy Martin. Together they took Daimler to its greatest success, with Manville serving on its board for 28 years, from 1905 until his death in 1933.

With backgrounds as electrical engineers, Martin and Manville often chose projects based on technical viability instead of commercial value. Under their leadership, Daimler had a sedate image, seeming to cater to "dowagers or the dead". Lanchester was acquired with the intent to show a different image, but in the event their cars, like BSA's, became Daimlers wearing different names.

Manville was president of The Society of Motor Manufacturers and Traders from 1907 to 1913.

Manville's election to the House of Commons was an outcome of his association with Daimler.

=== Motorsport ===
In his early days on Daimler's board, Manville drove works-prepared cars in competition. His first wife, Maud, would also compete, driving another car.

The Manvilles competed in the five-day Herkomer Trophy in 1905 and 1906. Maud, driving a works-prepared 45 hp Daimler, won the speed section of the 1905 event ahead of Edward, who took second place in that section. In the 1906 event, however, they were uncompetitive against thinly-disguised racing cars, and Maud finished in 11th place, just behind the highest-placed Daimler. The Kaiser's brother, Prince Henry of Prussia, apologised to her for the lack of consideration from most of the other entrants. Manville stated that Daimler would not compete in the event again.

== Parliament ==
Edward Manville was Unionist member of Parliament for Coventry from 1918 to 1923 and was knighted in 1923 at the end of his term.

== Involvement with early television development ==
Manville was first chairman of the Baird Television Development Company, which held its first meeting on 18 July 1927. The object of the company was to develop commercially the Baird television and other inventions. As a professional electrical engineer, Manville felt obliged to keep abreast of all of Baird's developments. His frequent questions and suggestions irritated Baird, who altered the doorway to his laboratory to be too narrow for Manville to pass through without effort. Baird said he preferred to keep a distance from Manville's "booming voice" and just view him at the far end of the boardroom table "like a florid sunset seen through a cloud of cigar smoke". Commercial exploitation was continued by Baird International Television Limited, launched in June 1928. Government and BBC having become important, Lord Ampthill, a former acting viceroy of India, was made chairman and Manville a director.

== Other interests and involvements ==
Manville was also chairman of Car and General Insurance Corporation, Reinsurance Corporation and Phoenix Oil and Transport. In addition, he was formerly president of the Association of British Chambers of Commerce and vice-president of the Federation of British Industries, as well as a director of about 15 other companies. When compelled to reveal all directorships by the 1930 Companies Act, Manville reported that he was on 27 boards of directors. He found time for civil and masonic activities and was a Past Master of several City Livery Companies.

== Death ==
Sir Edward Manville died after a short illness in London on 17 March 1933, aged 70. He was survived by his second wife Rachel, daughter of Mr. John Holmes, a civil engineer of Calcutta who died in 1940. His first wife, Maud, daughter of Colonel C.T. Wallis, had died in 1909. There were no children from either marriage.

== Notes ==
Parliament of the United Kingdom
Preceded by David Marshall Mason	Member of Parliament for Coventry; 1918–1923	Succeeded by A. A. Purcell
