= Henry Eaton, 1st Baron Cheylesmore =

British businessman, politician, and art collector (1816–1891)

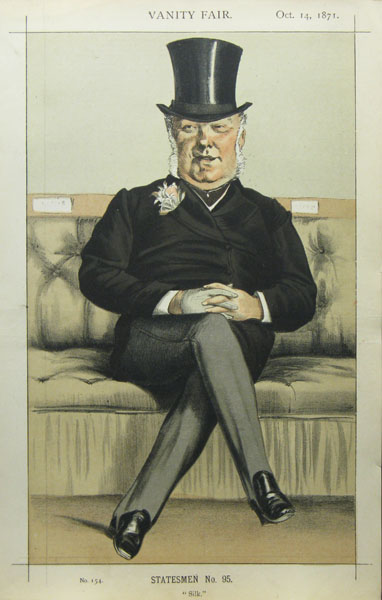
"Silk" Eaton as caricatured by James Tissot in Vanity Fair, October 1871

Henry William Eaton, 1st Baron Cheylesmore (13 March 1816 – 2 October 1891) was a British businessman, Conservative politician, and art collector.

== Life ==
The son of Henry Eaton, he was head of William Eaton & Sons, China-silk brokers. He was also Member of Parliament for Coventry from 1865 to 1880, and from 1881 to 1887. The latter year, in Queen Victoria's Golden Jubilee Honours, Eaton was raised to the peerage as Baron Cheylesmore, of Cheylesmore in the City of Coventry and County of Warwick. He took the title to match the Manor House he had bought; see below.

In 1871 he bought the medieval Cheylesmore Manor House and park, then just outside Coventry, now a Grade II* listed building used as a Registry office in the suburb built on the historic park.

== Art collecting ==
Cheylesmore was a significant art collector, mainly of contemporary British painting. The star of his collection, and his posthumous sale at Christie's in May 1892 (lot numbers and prices realized noted), was undoubtedly The Monarch of the Glen (lot 42, £7,245) by Sir Edwin Landseer, one of the most popular paintings of the age. Altogether 31 of the 86 lots were by Landseer, many bought at his studio sale in 1874. Other artists with several works included William Powell Frith, lots 19–21, the Biblical Orientalist Frederick Goodall, lots 22–28, David Roberts, lots 71–73, and the American sculptor Hiram Powers, with three busts as lots 84–86.

Though the Monarch, which in 1916 passed into company ownership for exploiting in advertising, was perhaps too expensive, his son William bought back four paintings which he bequeathed to the National Gallery, London in 1902. These included two of the next most expensive works, The Execution of Lady Jane Grey (1833) by Paul Delaroche (lot 78, £1,575), and Cromer Sands by William Collins (lot 15, £2,205). Sunday in the Backwoods by Thomas Faed and now in Wolverhampton Art Gallery (lot 18, £1,785), and the second most expensive painting in the sale was Saint Michael's Mount, The Morning after the Storm, by Clarkson Frederick Stanfield (lot 74, £3,150). Five other Landseers fetched between £892 and £1,680, this for lot 60, Flood in the Highlands, also in his son's bequest but refused by the National Gallery, and now Aberdeen Art Gallery.

An 1869 window in the Parish Church of St. Michael, Coventry, depicting the life of Solomon, was the gift of Eaton. As Coventry Cathedral, the church was destroyed in World War II. Eaton also donated land at Cheylesmore for the church's vicarage, in 1871.

== Family and death ==
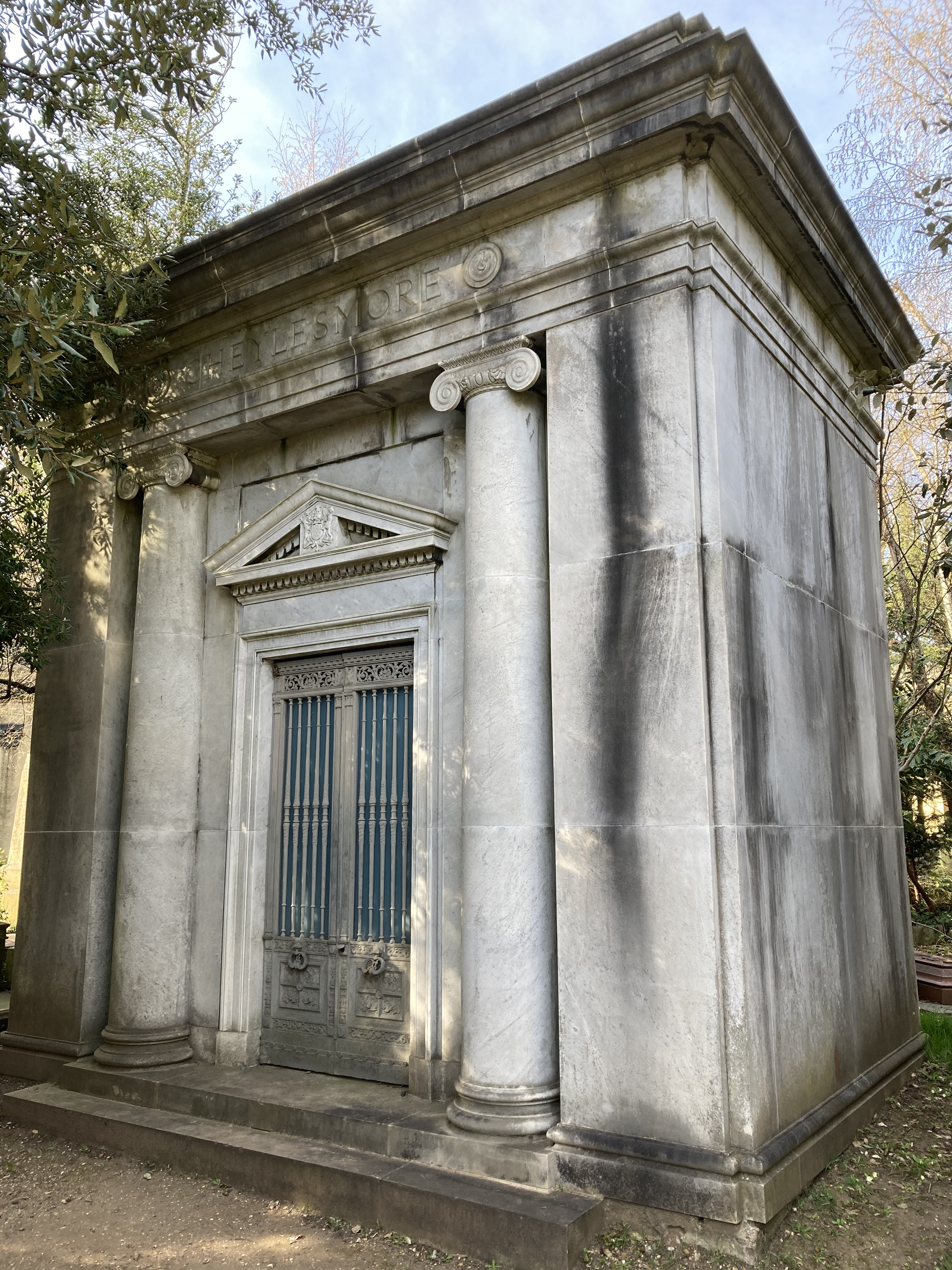
Cheylesmore mausoleum in Highgate Cemetery

Eaton married in 1839 Charlotte Gorham Harman, only daughter of Thomas Leader Harman of New Orleans. They had three sons and two daughters. His wife died in 1877 and his eldest son Henry Enderby two years later. Cheylesmore died on 2 October 1891, aged 75, and was buried on the western side of Highgate Cemetery in a vault (no.9863) later covered in 1926 by the mausoleum built for his third son, Herbert Eaton. He was succeeded in the barony by his second son William. The third son Herbert Francis became the 3rd Baron in 1902.

== Notes ==
Parliament of the United Kingdom
Preceded by Sir Joseph Paxton; Morgan Treherne	Member of Parliament for Coventry; 1865 – 1880; With: Morgan Treherne 1865–1867; Henry Mather Jackson 1867–1868; Samuel Carter 1868; Alexander Staveley Hill 1868–1874; Sir Henry Jackson 1874–1881	Succeeded by Henry Jackson; William Wills
Preceded by William Wills; Sir Henry Jackson	Member of Parliament for Coventry; 1881–1887; With: William Wills 1881–1885	Succeeded by William Ballantine
Peerage of the United Kingdom
New creation	Baron Cheylesmore; 1887–1891	Succeeded by William Eaton
