= Nawan Pind Naicha =

- Village
- Location in Punjab, India Nawan Pind Naicha (India)
- Coordinates: 31.1051628°N 75.7467092°E
- Country: India
- State: Punjab
- District: Jalandhar

Government
  - Type: Panchayat raj
  - Body: Gram panchayat
- Elevation: 240 m (790 ft)

Population (2011)
  - Total: 968
- Sex ratio 510/458 ♂/♀

Languages
  - Official: Punjabi
- Time zone: UTC+5:30 (IST)
- PIN: 144409
- ISO 3166 code: IN-PB
- Vehicle registration: PB- 08
- Website: jalandhar.nic.in

Nawan Pind Naicha is a village in Jalandhar district of Punjab State, India. It is located 9 km from Goraya, 12 km from Phillaur, 38 km from district headquarters Jalandhar and 125 km from state capital Chandigarh. The village is administrated by a sarpanch who is an elected representative of village as per Panchayati raj (India).

== Transport ==
Bhattian railway station is the nearest train station; however, Phillaur Junction train station is 11.4 km away from the village. The village is 42 km away from domestic airport in Ludhiana and the nearest international airport is located in Chandigarh also Sri Guru Ram Dass Jee International Airport is the second nearest airport which is 129 km away in Amritsar.
