= Richard Hopkins (died 1708) =

English politician

Richard Hopkins (c. 1641 – 1 February 1708) was an English politician who sat in the House of Commons variously between 1670 and 1701. He was an active opponent of King James II and a promoter of the Glorious Revolution.

Hopkins was the son of Sir Richard Hopkins, steward and MP for Coventry, and his wife Sarah Button, daughter of John Button of Buckland, Hampshire, and granddaughter of William Jesson who was also MP for Coventry.

Hopkins was elected Member of Parliament for Coventry in the Cavalier Parliament in a by-election in 1670 and sat until 1685. He actively opposed the King, and urged on the crowd in Coventry which greeted the captive Monmouth enthusiastically in 1682. He was restrained from partaking in the Battle of Sedgemoor but is said to have been marked out as a malignant. Coventry was forced to surrender its charter in 1683 and a number of officials and council members were removed as a result of the town's perceived disaffection. Hopkins was replaced as MP in 1685. When King James II visited Coventry in September 1687, he stayed at Hopkins's house and wanted toe bestow favours on him, but did not gain his support. When William of Orange landed in England at the end of 1688, King James' daughter Anne escaped from confinement in London and fled to the Midlands where she stayed a few days with Hopkins until news arrived that James had fled the country.

Hopkins was re-elected MP for Coventry in 1690 and sat until 1695. He was re-elected MP for Coventry in 1698 and sat until 1701.

Hopkins married Mary Johnson, daughter of Alderman Johnson. Their son Edward was also MP for Coventry.

Hopkins died on 1 February 1707, aged 67 and was buried in the Parish Church of St Michael, Coventry, as, subsequently, were his wife (died 13 October 1711), son and daughter in law, and eldest grandson. The church contained plaques commemorating these family members, and flat stones marked their burial places. As Coventry Cathedral, the church was destroyed during World War II.
