= Robert Coke (Coventry MP) =

English politician

Sir Robert Coke (1587 – 19 July 1653) of Caludon Castle, Coventry, Huntingfield, Suffolk, and Epsom, Surrey, was an English politician.

== Life ==
He was the second son of Sir Edward Coke and his wife, Bridget Paston, daughter of John Paston (MP), becoming his father's heir when the eldest son Edward died as an infant. He was knighted in 1607. After marrying Theophila, daughter of Sir Thomas Berkeley, he resided at Caludon Castle, owned by his wife's family the Berkeleys, and was elected to parliament for Coventry, in the vicinity, in 1614. That year he was the dedicatee of a mathematics book by William Bedwell, based on a work by Lazarus Schöner.

In summer 1617, when Frances Coke was defying her father Sir Edward's wishes over a marriage, she was sent to her brother Sir Robert at Kingston upon Thames. This was one step in a complex story mostly played out along the River Thames.

Coke was heavily in debt in the 1620s. He was elected again to parliament, in 1624, for Fowey, thought to be a nominee for William Herbert, 3rd Earl of Pembroke. When his father died in 1634 he was deeper in debt; he inherited a family home at Huntingfield, Suffolk. He also inherited his father's legal papers; but they had been marked down in advance as of interest to the king, and Sir Edward's study was sealed up on his death. Sir Robert received only what was left after royal officers had been through the documents; and he was still petitioning in 1640 for some of those that had been taken, with a view to publication.

In 1634, also, Coke had the monument at Bramfield church completed by Nicholas Stone, to his late indebted brother Arthur and his wife.

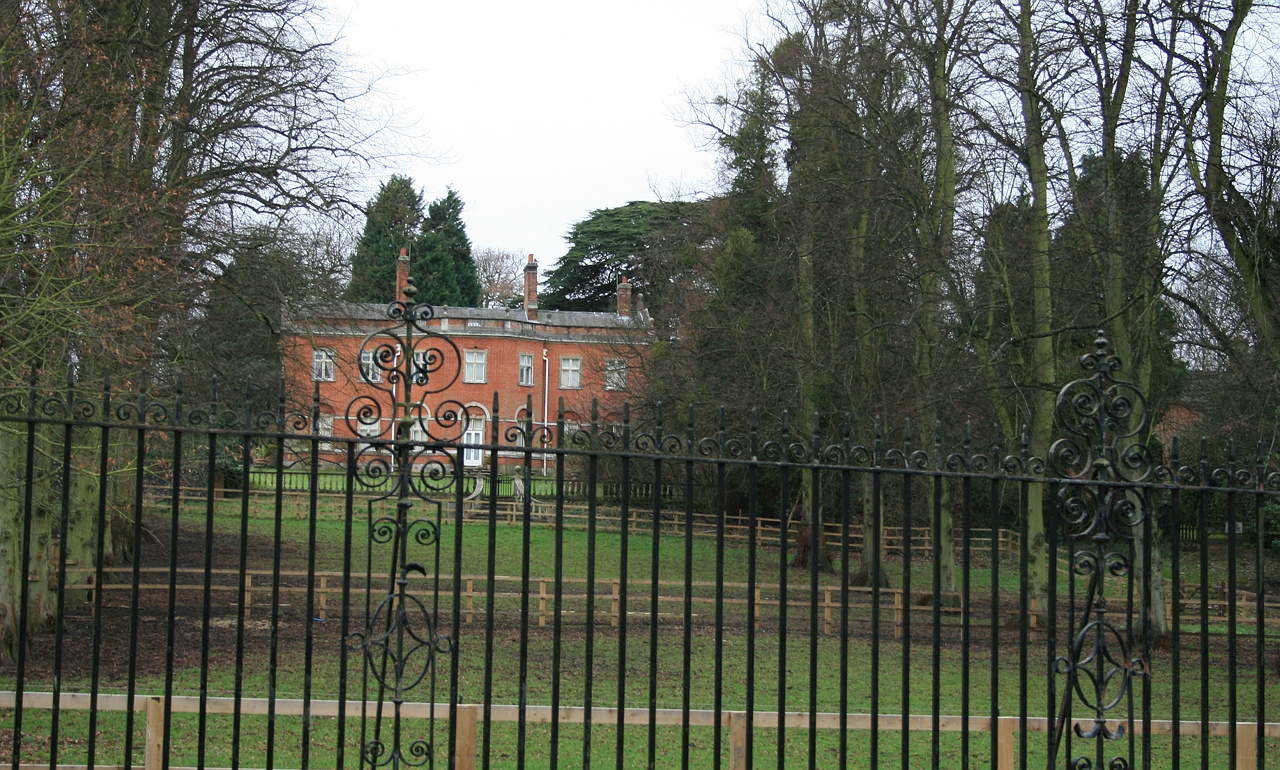
Durdans, Epsom, Surrey, today

Having lived in Suffolk for a period, he then moved to a family house, "Durdans" near Epsom in Surrey. There was a performance of the play Philaster in the early 1640s at Durdans, with the young Samuel Pepys in the cast.

A royalist of the First English Civil War, Coke was detained in the Tower of London. There his wife, Lady Theophila, visited him, but she died in 1643, of smallpox. Coke was made to pay a fine, and had his lands sequestered until 1647. The royalist cleric John Pearson had to give up his Suffolk living at Thorington, controlled by Henry Coke, in 1646. He made his way to Surrey and Durdens, acting as chaplain to Sir Robert Coke there in 1650.

Coke was pricked High Sheriff of Suffolk for 1652–53 and died at Epsom on 19 July 1653.

== Family and legacy ==
Coke married, in 1613, Theophila, daughter of Sir Thomas Berkeley and Elizabeth Carey, Lady Berkeley; there were songs at the wedding from Edward Lapworth, They had no children. The main Coke estate around Holkham descended to Thomas Coke, 1st Earl of Leicester (1697–1759), grandson of Robert Coke (c.1651–1679), grandson of Henry Coke of Thurrington, Robert Coke's younger brother.

Durdans at Epsom had been acquired in 1617 by Lady Berkeley, who gave it to her daughter Lady Theophila. Coke left Durdans to his nephew George Berkeley, 1st Earl of Berkeley. Berkeley also received a significant collection of books, containing Sir Edward Coke's noted London library; a manuscript collection of Méric Casaubon was part of it. The books went eventually to Sion College, in 1680, from Durdans. Berkeley built up Durdans with materials taken from Nonsuch Palace, not far away at Ewell, in the early 1680s.
