= Richard Hopkins (died 1682) =

Member of the Parliament of England

Sir Richard Hopkins (c.1612 – 16 July 1682) was an English politician who sat in the House of Commons in 1660.

Hopkins was the son of Sampson Hopkins, mayor and MP for Coventry, and his wife Jane. He was called to the bar and became serjeant-at-law. He became steward of Coventry.

In March 1660, Hopkins was elected Member of Parliament for Coventry in the Convention Parliament but the election was declared void on 31 July 1660. However he was returned again at the by-election in August. He was an active supporter of the Restoration and led a deputation from Coventry to London with presents for the King. He was later knighted. However he lost his seat at Coventry in the 1661 election.

Hopkins married Sarah Button, daughter of John Button of Buckland, Hampshire, and granddaughter of William Jesson who was also MP for Coventry. Their son Richard was later MP for Coventry.
