= Robert Beake =

English politician

Robert Beake (died 22 September 1708) was an English politician who sat in the House of Commons variously between 1654 and 1679. He supported the Parliamentary cause in the English Civil War.

Beake was a Presbyterian alderman and draper of Coventry, and was commissioned into the parliamentary army. In 1654, he was elected Member of Parliament for Coventry in the First Protectorate Parliament. He became mayor of Coventry in 1655 and was elected MP for Coventry in the Second Protectorate Parliament in 1656. In 1657 he wrote his diary which showed how zealous he was in his puritan duties enforcing strict Sabbatarianism and suppressing disorder. Those who travelled on Sundays were put in the stocks or the cage, and even a man whose journey was in order to be a godfather was fined. On Sundays Beake spent his time in the park, observing 'who idly walked there'. He took action to suppress the sale of unlicensed ale and visited all the unlicensed alehouses in three wards in person. He was re-elected MP for Coventry in 1659 for the Third Protectorate Parliament.

In 1660, Beake was elected in the Convention Parliament However a parliamentary enquiry declared the election illegal, and in the following by-election, he lost his seat to William Jesson. Beake was elected again as MP for Coventry in 1679. He only sat for a short time, but voted for the first Exclusion Bill.

He is memorialised in the naming of Beake Avenue, a major road in the north of Coventry. Beake's diary is held in the local record office.

Parliament of England
Preceded by Not represented in the Barebones parliament	Member of Parliament for Coventry; 1654–1659; With: William Purefoy	Succeeded by Not represented in restored Rump
