= Coventry (constituency) =

Parliamentary constituency in the United Kingdom, 1885–1945

- Former borough constituency for the House of Commons
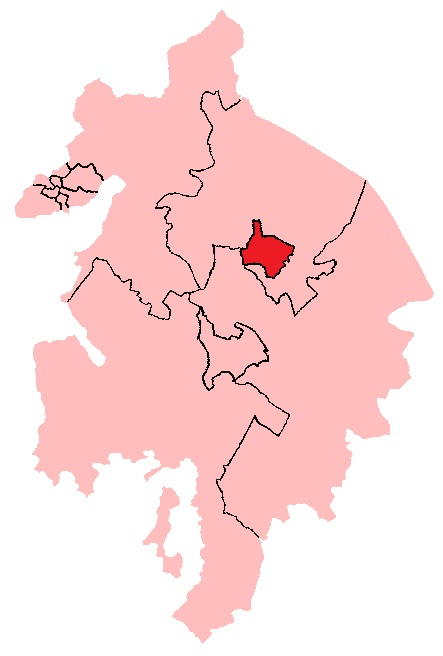
- Coventry in Warwickshire, 1885-1918
- County: Warwickshire
- Major settlements: Coventry

1295–1945
- Seats: 1295–1885: Two; 1885–1945: One
- Replaced by: Coventry East; Coventry West

Coventry was a borough constituency which was represented in the House of Commons of England and its successors, the House of Commons of Great Britain and the House of Commons of the United Kingdom.

Centred on the City of Coventry in Warwickshire, it returned two Members of Parliament (MPs) from 1295 until the Redistribution of Seats Act 1885, when its representation was reduced to one. The Coventry constituency was abolished for the 1945 general election, when it was split into two new constituencies: Coventry East and Coventry West.

Elections were held using the bloc vote system when electing two MPs (until 1885), and then first-past-the-post to elect one MP thereafter.

== Boundaries ==
1832–1868: The City of Coventry and the suburbs thereof.

1868–1918: The existing parliamentary borough and the Parish of Stoke.

The constituency was unchanged by the Representation of the People Act 1884. By the time its boundaries were revised in 1918, it was defined as consisting of the city of Coventry, the parishes of St. Michael Without and Holy Trinity Without, the parish of Stoke, and part of the parish of Wyken.

1918–1945: The county borough of Coventry.

== History ==
In the eighteenth century Coventry was, despite its size, known as a corrupt borough.

== Members of Parliament ==
=== MPs before 1660 ===
Parliament	First member	Second member
1295	Anketil de Coleshull	Richard de Weston
1298	Robert Russell	Robert Kelle
1301	Thomas Ballard	Lawrence de Schepey
1302	Ralph Tewe	John Russell
1305	Henry Bagot	Peter Baron
1306	Alexander de Moubray	Henry Bagot
1315	Richard de Spicer	John de Langley
1346	John de Percy	Nicholas de Hunt
1353	Nicholas Michel	Richard de Stoke
1354–1449	No representation	
1450	Thomas Lyttelton	?
1453	William Elton	?
1460	Henry Butler	Richard Braytoft
1467	Henry Butler	Richard Braytoft
1472	Henry Butler	John Wildegryse
1478	Henry Butler	John Wildegryse
1485	Sir Robert Onley	
1491	Richard Cook	John Smith
1495	Henry Marlar	
1510-1515	No names known	
1523	Ralph Swyllyngton	Richard Marlar
1529	Roger Wigston	John Bond
1536	?Roger Wigston	?
1539	Roger Wigston	Baldwin Porter
1542	Roger Wigston, died and replaced Jan 1544 by Edward Saunders	Henry Over alias Waver
1545	Christopher Warren	Henry Porter
1547	Christopher Warren	Henry Porter
1553 (Mar)	James Rogers	John Talonts
1553 (Oct)	John Nethermill	Thomas Bond
1554 (Apr)	Thomas Keyvet	Edward Davenport
1554 (Nov)	John Throckmorton	John Harford
1555	John Throckmorton	Henry Porter
1558	John Throckmorton	John Talonts
1558–1559	John Throckmorton	John Nethermill
1562–1563	Thomas Dudley	Richard Grafton
1571	Henry Goodere	Edmund Brownell
1572	Edmund Brownell, died and replaced Apr 1573 by Bartholemew Tate	Thomas Wight
1584 (Oct)	Edward Boughton	Thomas Wight
1586	Thomas Saunders	Henry Breres
1588 (Oct)	Thomas Saunders	Henry Breres
1593	Thomas Saunders	John Myles
1597 (Sep)	Henry Kervyn	Thomas Saunders
1601 (Oct)	Henry Breres	Thomas Saunders
1604	Henry Breres	John Rogerson, taken ill and replaced by Sir John Harington
1614	Sir Robert Coke	Sampson Hopkins
1621	Sampson Hopkins	Henry Sewall
1624	Sir Edward Coke	Henry Harwell
1626	Henry Harwell	Isaac Walden
1628	William Purefoy of Caldecote	Richard Green of Wyken
1629–1640	No Parliaments summoned	
1640 (Apr)	William Jesson	Simon Norton
1640 (Nov)	Simon Norton, died 1641 and replaced by William Jesson	John Barker excluded in 1648 in Pride's Purge
1649	John Barker (readmitted 1649)	(one seat only)
1653	Coventry not represented in the Barebones Parliament	
1654	William Purefoy	Robert Beake
1656	William Purefoy	Robert Beake
1659	William Purefoy	Robert Beake

=== MPs 1660–1885 ===
Year	1st Member	1st Party	2nd Member	2nd Party
1660, March	Richard Hopkins		Robert Beake	
1660, August	Richard Hopkins		William Jesson	
1661	Sir Clement Fisher, Bt		Thomas Flynt	
1670	Sir Clement Fisher, Bt		Richard Hopkins	
1679, Feb	Robert Beake		Richard Hopkins	
1679, August	John Stratford		Richard Hopkins	
1685	Sir Roger Cave, Bt		Sir Thomas Norton	
1689	Sir Roger Cave, Bt		John Stratford	
1690	Richard Hopkins		John Stratford	
1695	George Bohun		Thomas Gery	
1698	Sir Christopher Hales, Bt		Richard Hopkins	
1701, Jan	Sir Christopher Hales, Bt		Thomas Hopkins	
1701, Dec	Sir Christopher Hales, Bt		Edward Hopkins	
1702	Sir Christopher Hales, Bt		Thomas Gery	
1707	Sir Orlando Bridgeman, Bt	Whig	Edward Hopkins	
1710, Oct	Robert Craven		Thomas Gery	
1710, Dec	Clobery Bromley		Thomas Gery	
1711	Sir Christopher Hales, Bt		Thomas Gery	
1713	Sir Christopher Hales, Bt		Sir Fulwar Skipwith, Bt	
1715	(Sir) Adolphus Oughton		Sir Thomas Samwell, Bt	
1722	(Sir) Adolphus Oughton		John Neale	
1734	(Sir) Adolphus Oughton		John Bird	
1737, Feb	John Neale		John Bird	
1737, Apr	John Neale		Earl of Euston	
1741	William Grove		Earl of Euston	
1747, Jun	William Grove		Viscount Petersham	
1747, Dec	William Grove		Samuel Greatheed	
1761	James Hewitt		Hon. Andrew Archer	
1766	Hon. Henry Seymour-Conway		Hon. Andrew Archer	
1768	Hon. Henry Seymour-Conway		Sir Richard Glyn, Bt	
1773	Hon. Henry Seymour-Conway		Walter Waring	
1774	Edward Roe Yeo	Tory	Walter Waring	
1780, Feb	Edward Roe Yeo	Tory	John Baker Holroyd	Tory
1780, Oct	Election abandoned due to rioting; both seats vacant			
1780, Dec	Sir Thomas Hallifax	Whig	Thomas Rogers	Whig
1781	Edward Roe Yeo	Tory	The Lord Sheffield	Tory
1783	Hon. William Seymour-Conway		The Lord Sheffield	Tory
1784	Sir Sampson Gideon, Bt		John Eardley Wilmot	
1796	William Wilberforce Bird	Whig	Nathaniel Jefferys	Tory
1802	Francis William Barlow	Tory	Nathaniel Jefferys	Tory
1803	Francis William Barlow	Tory	Peter Moore	Whig
1805	William Mills	Whig	Peter Moore	Whig
1812	Joseph Butterworth	Whig	Peter Moore	Whig
1818	Edward Ellice	Whig	Peter Moore	Whig
1826	Richard Edensor Heathcote	Tory	Thomas Bilcliffe Fyler	Tory
1830	Edward Ellice	Whig	Thomas Bilcliffe Fyler	Tory
1831	Edward Ellice	Whig	Henry Bulwer	Whig
1835	Edward Ellice	Whig	William Williams	Radical
1847	Edward Ellice	Whig	George James Turner	Conservative
1851	Edward Ellice	Whig	Charles Geach	Radical
1854	Edward Ellice	Whig	Sir Joseph Paxton	Whig
1859	Edward Ellice	Liberal	Sir Joseph Paxton	Liberal
1863	Morgan Treherne	Conservative	Sir Joseph Paxton	Liberal
1865	Morgan Treherne	Conservative	Henry Eaton	Conservative
1867	Henry Jackson	Liberal	Henry Eaton	Conservative
1868, March	Samuel Carter	Liberal	Henry Eaton	Conservative
1868, November	Alexander Staveley Hill	Conservative	Henry Eaton	Conservative
1874	Sir Henry Jackson, Bt	Liberal	Henry Eaton	Conservative
1880	Sir Henry Jackson, Bt	Liberal	William Wills	Liberal
1881	Henry Eaton	Conservative	William Wills	Liberal
1885	representation reduced to one member			

=== MPs 1885–1945 ===
Election	Member	Party
1885	Henry Eaton	Conservative
1887 by-election	William Ballantine	Liberal
1895	Charles James Murray	Conservative
1906	A. E. W. Mason	Liberal
Jan 1910	Kenneth Foster	Conservative
Dec 1910	David Marshall Mason	Liberal
1918	Edward Manville	Coalition Conservative
1923	A. A. Purcell	Labour
1924	Archibald Boyd-Carpenter	Conservative
1929	Philip Noel-Baker	Labour
1931	William Strickland	Conservative
1945	constituency abolished: see Coventry East & Coventry West	

== Election results ==
=== Elections in the 1830s ===
General election 1830: Coventry (2 seats)
Party	Candidate	Votes	%	±%
Tory	Thomas Bilcliffe Fyler	Unopposed		
Whig	Edward Ellice	Unopposed		
Tory hold				
Whig gain from Tory				

General election 1831: Coventry (2 seats)
Party	Candidate	Votes	%	±%
Whig	Edward Ellice	1,658	38.0	N/A
Whig	Henry Bulwer	1,560	35.7	N/A
Tory	Thomas Bilcliffe Fyler	1,150	26.3	N/A
Majority		410	9.4	N/A
Turnout		2,721	c. 77.7	N/A
Registered electors		c. 3,500		
Whig hold		Swing	N/A	
Whig gain from Tory		Swing	N/A	

General election 1832: Coventry (2 seats)
Party	Candidate	Votes	%	±%
Whig	Edward Ellice	1,613	40.8	+2.8
Whig	Henry Bulwer	1,607	40.6	+4.9
Tory	Thomas Bilcliffe Fyler	371	9.4	−3.8
Tory	Morgan Thomas	366	9.2	−4.0
Majority		1,236	31.2	+21.8
Turnout		1,989	60.5	c. −17.2
Registered electors		3,285		
Whig hold		Swing	+3.4	
Whig hold		Swing	+4.4	

Ellice was appointed Secretary at War, requiring a by-election.

By-election, 12 April 1833: Coventry
Party	Candidate	Votes	%	±%
Whig	Edward Ellice	1,502	53.7	−27.7
Tory	Morgan Thomas	1,208	43.2	+24.6
Radical	John Morgan Cobbett	89	3.2	N/A
Majority		294	10.5	−20.7
Turnout		2,799	85.2	+24.7
Registered electors		3,285		
Whig hold		Swing	−26.2	

General election 1835: Coventry (2 seats)
Party	Candidate	Votes	%	±%
Radical	William Williams	1,865	37.1	N/A
Whig	Edward Ellice	1,601	31.8	−49.6
Conservative	Morgan Thomas	1,566	31.1	+12.5
Turnout		3,206	89.6	+29.1
Registered electors		3,577		
Majority		264	5.3	N/A
Radical gain from Whig		Swing		
Majority		35	0.7	−30.5
Whig hold		Swing	−31.1	

General election 1837: Coventry (2 seats)
Party	Candidate	Votes	%	±%
Whig	Edward Ellice	1,778	27.5	−4.3
Radical	William Williams	1,748	27.0	−10.1
Conservative	Morgan Thomas	1,511	23.3	+7.8
Conservative	John David Hay Hill	1,392	21.5	+6.0
Chartist	John Bell	43	0.7	New
Turnout		3,323	90.7	+1.1
Registered electors		3,577		
Majority		30	0.5	−0.2
Whig hold		Swing	−5.6	
Majority		237	3.7	−1.6
Radical hold		Swing	−8.5	

=== Elections in the 1840s ===
General election 1841: Coventry (2 seats)
Party	Candidate	Votes	%	±%
Radical	William Williams	1,870	37.5	+10.5
Whig	Edward Ellice	1,829	36.7	+9.2
Conservative	Thomas Weir	1,290	25.9	−18.9
Turnout		c. 3,140	c. 82.9	c. −7.8
Registered electors		3,789		
Majority		41	0.8	−2.9
Radical hold		Swing	+10.0	
Majority		539	10.8	+10.3
Whig hold		Swing	+9.3	

General election 1847: Coventry (2 seats)
Party	Candidate	Votes	%	±%
Whig	Edward Ellice	2,901	46.1	+9.4
Conservative	George James Turner	1,754	27.9	+2.0
Radical	William Williams	1,633	26.0	−11.5
Turnout		3,144 (est)	77.8 (est)	−5.1
Registered electors		4,043		
Majority		1,147	18.2	+7.4
Whig hold		Swing	+5.2	
Majority		121	1.9	N/A
Conservative gain from Radical		Swing	+3.9	

=== Elections in the 1850s ===
Turner resigned after being appointed Vice-Chancellor of the High Court, causing a by-election.

By-election, 8 April 1851: Coventry (1 seat)
Party	Candidate	Votes	%	±%
Radical	Charles Geach	1,669	60.2	+34.2
Whig	Edward Strutt	1,104	39.8	−6.3
Majority		565	20.4	N/A
Turnout		2,773	65.7	−12.1
Registered electors		4,223		
Radical gain from Conservative		Swing	+20.3	

General election 1852: Coventry (2 seats)
Party	Candidate	Votes	%	±%
Radical	Charles Geach	Unopposed		
Whig	Edward Ellice	Unopposed		
Registered electors		4,502		
Radical gain from Conservative				
Whig hold				

Geach's death caused a by-election.

By-election, 2 December 1854: Coventry (1 seat)
Party	Candidate	Votes	%	±%
Whig	Joseph Paxton	Unopposed		
Whig gain from Radical				

General election 1857: Coventry (2 seats)
Party	Candidate	Votes	%	±%
Whig	Edward Ellice	2,810	41.0	N/A
Whig	Joseph Paxton	2,384	34.8	N/A
Whig	John Mellor	703	10.3	N/A
Conservative	Morgan Treherne	599	8.7	New
Peelite	Robert Phillimore	356	5.2	New
Majority		1,681	24.5	N/A
Turnout		3,426 (est)	68.8 (est)	N/A
Registered electors		4,982		
Whig hold				
Whig gain from Radical				

- Phillimore retired from the contest two hours into polling.

General election 1859: Coventry (2 seats)
Party	Candidate	Votes	%	±%
Liberal	Edward Ellice	3,107	41.7	+0.7
Liberal	Joseph Paxton	2,409	32.4	−2.4
Conservative	Morgan Treherne	1,928	25.9	+17.2
Majority		481	6.5	−18.0
Turnout		4,686 (est)	87.4 (est)	+18.6
Registered electors		5,363		
Liberal hold		Swing	−4.0	
Liberal hold		Swing	−5.5	

=== Elections in the 1860s ===
Ellice's death caused a by-election.

By-election, 8 October 1863: Coventry (1 seat)
Party	Candidate	Votes	%	±%
Conservative	Morgan Treherne	2,263	51.5	+25.6
Liberal	Arthur Peel	2,129	48.5	−25.6
Majority		134	3.0	N/A
Turnout		4,392	84.4	−3.0
Registered electors		5,206		
Conservative gain from Liberal		Swing	+25.6	

Paxton's death caused a by-election.

By-election, 21 June 1865: Coventry (1 seat)
Party	Candidate	Votes	%	±%
Conservative	Henry Eaton	2,395	52.8	+26.9
Liberal	Thomas Mason Jones	2,142	47.2	−26.9
Majority		253	5.6	N/A
Turnout		4,537	91.3	+3.9
Registered electors		4,967		
Conservative gain from Liberal		Swing	+26.9	

General election 1865: Coventry (2 seats)
Party	Candidate	Votes	%	±%
Conservative	Henry Eaton	2,489	26.2	+13.2
Conservative	Morgan Treherne	2,401	25.3	+12.3
Liberal	Edward Fordham Flower	2,342	24.7	−17.0
Liberal	Thomas Mason Jones	2,259	23.8	−8.6
Majority		59	0.6	N/A
Turnout		4,746 (est)	95.5 (est)	+8.1
Registered electors		4,967		
Conservative gain from Liberal		Swing	+13.0	
Conservative gain from Liberal		Swing	+12.6	

Treherne's death caused a by-election.

By-election, 23 July 1867: Coventry (1 seat)
Party	Candidate	Votes	%	±%
Liberal	Henry Jackson	2,429	53.4	+4.9
Conservative	William Ferrand	2,123	46.6	−4.9
Majority		306	6.8	N/A
Turnout		4,552	91.6	−3.9
Registered electors		4,967		
Liberal gain from Conservative		Swing	+4.9	

The by-election was declared void on petition due to bribery by Jackson's agent.

By-election, 26 March 1868: Coventry (1 seat)
Party	Candidate	Votes	%	±%
Liberal	Samuel Carter	2,415	53.1	+4.6
Conservative	Alexander Staveley Hill	2,134	46.9	−4.6
Majority		281	6.2	N/A
Turnout		4,549	91.6	−3.9
Registered electors		4,967		
Liberal gain from Conservative		Swing	+4.6	

General election 1868: Coventry (2 seats)
Party	Candidate	Votes	%	±%
Conservative	Henry Eaton	3,781	25.7	−0.5
Conservative	Alexander Staveley Hill	3,761	25.6	+0.3
Liberal	Henry Jackson	3,594	24.4	−0.3
Liberal	Samuel Carter	3,576	24.3	+0.5
Majority		167	1.2	+0.6
Turnout		7,356 (est)	92.8 (est)	−2.7
Registered electors		7,925		
Conservative hold		Swing	−0.4	
Conservative hold		Swing	+0.4	

=== Elections in the 1870s ===
General election 1874: Coventry (2 seats)
Party	Candidate	Votes	%	±%
Conservative	Henry Eaton	3,823	25.6	−0.1
Liberal	Henry Jackson	3,799	25.5	+1.1
Liberal	Samuel Carter	3,662	24.6	+0.3
Conservative	Frederick du Pré Thornton	3,628	24.3	−1.3
Turnout		7,456 (est)	92.9 (est)	+0.1
Registered electors		8,027		
Majority		24	0.9	−1.3
Conservative hold		Swing	−0.2	
Majority		171	1.2	N/A
Liberal gain from Conservative		Swing	+1.2	

=== Elections in the 1880s ===
General election 1880: Coventry (2 seats)
Party	Candidate	Votes	%	±%
Liberal	Henry Jackson	4,184	26.1	+0.6
Liberal	William Wills	4,105	25.6	+1.0
Conservative	Henry Eaton	4,008	25.0	−0.6
Conservative	Arthur Kekewich	3,715	23.2	−1.1
Majority		97	0.6	N/A
Turnout		8,006 (est)	86.9 (est)	−6.0
Registered electors		9,208		
Liberal hold		Swing	+0.6	
Liberal gain from Conservative		Swing	+1.1	

Jackson resigned after being appointed a judge on the Queen's Bench Division of the High Court of Justice, causing a by-election.

By-election, 14 Mar 1881: Coventry (1 seat)
Party	Candidate	Votes	%	±%
Conservative	Henry Eaton	4,011	52.9	+4.7
Liberal	Ughtred Kay-Shuttleworth	3,568	47.1	−4.6
Majority		443	0.8	N/A
Turnout		7,579	91.7	+4.8 (est)
Registered electors		8,263		
Conservative gain from Liberal		Swing	+4.6	

General election 1885: Coventry (1 seat)
Party	Candidate	Votes	%	±%
Conservative	Henry Eaton	4,577	51.4	+3.2
Liberal	Courtenay Warner	4,328	48.6	−3.1
Majority		249	2.8	N/A
Turnout		8,905	91.5	+4.6 (est)
Registered electors		9,736		
Conservative win				

General election 1886: Coventry
Party	Candidate	Votes	%	±%
Conservative	Henry Eaton	4,201	52.5	+1.1
Liberal	William Ballantine	3,796	47.5	−1.1
Majority		405	5.0	+2.2
Turnout		7,996	82.1	−9.4
Registered electors		9,736		
Conservative hold		Swing	+1.1	

Eaton was elevated to the peerage, becoming Lord Cheylesmore, causing a by-election.

By-election, 9 Jul 1887: Coventry
Party	Candidate	Votes	%	±%
Liberal	William Ballantine	4,229	50.1	+2.6
Conservative	Herbert Eaton	4,213	49.9	−2.6
Majority		16	0.2	N/A
Turnout		8,442	85.6	+3.5
Registered electors		9,867		
Liberal gain from Conservative		Swing	+2.6	

=== Elections in the 1890s ===
General election 1892: Coventry
Party	Candidate	Votes	%	±%
Liberal	William Ballantine	4,754	50.8	+3.3
Conservative	Charles James Murray	4,611	49.2	−3.3
Majority		143	1.6	N/A
Turnout		9,365	86.4	+4.3
Registered electors		10,838		
Liberal gain from Conservative		Swing	+3.3	

Murray

General election 1895: Coventry
Party	Candidate	Votes	%	±%
Conservative	Charles James Murray	4,974	51.8	+2.6
Liberal	William Ballantine	4,624	48.2	−2.6
Majority		350	3.6	N/A
Turnout		9,598	87.8	+1.4
Registered electors		10,926		
Conservative gain from Liberal		Swing	+2.6	

=== Elections in the 1900s ===
General election 1900: Coventry
Party	Candidate	Votes	%	±%
Conservative	Charles James Murray	5,257	55.7	+3.9
Liberal	L Cowen	4,188	44.3	−3.9
Majority		1,069	11.4	+7.8
Turnout		9,445	77.8	−10.0
Registered electors		12,145		
Conservative hold		Swing	+3.9	

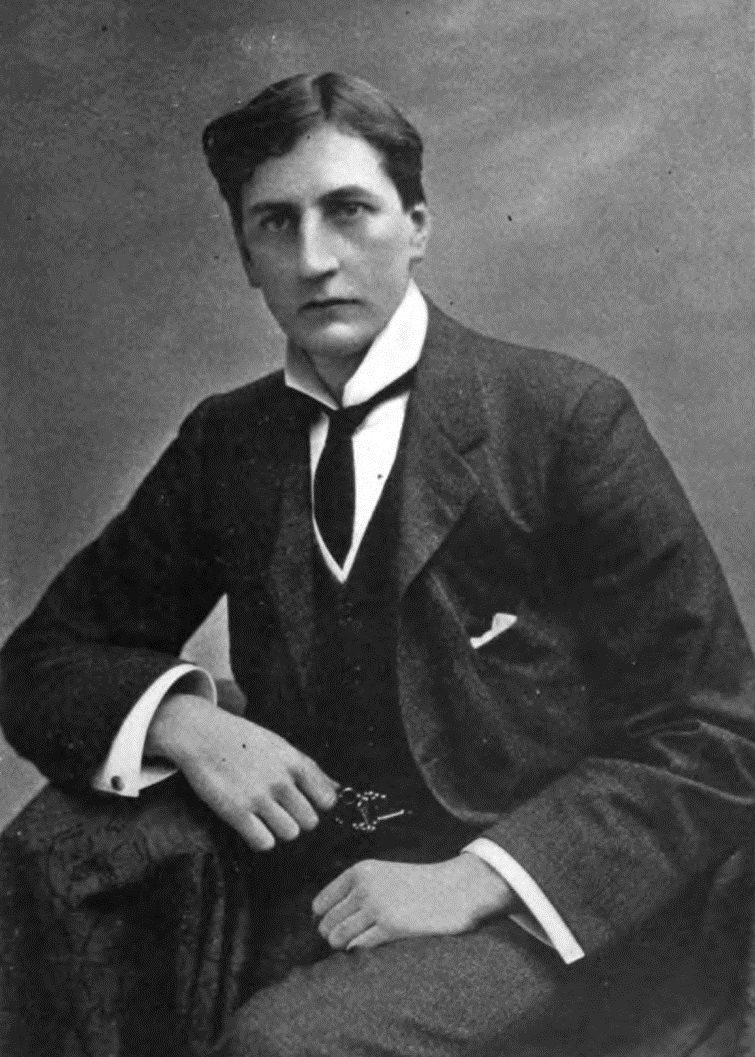
Mason

General election 1906: Coventry
Party	Candidate	Votes	%	±%
Liberal	A. E. W. Mason	6,554	54.5	+10.2
Conservative	Kenneth Foster	5,462	45.5	−10.2
Majority		1,092	9.0	N/A
Turnout		12,016	86.0	+8.2
Registered electors		13,965		
Liberal gain from Conservative		Swing	+10.2	

=== Elections in the 1910s ===
General election January 1910: Coventry
Party	Candidate	Votes	%	±%
Conservative	Kenneth Foster	7,369	50.7	+5.2
Liberal	Silas Hocking	7,153	49.3	−5.2
Majority		216	1.4	N/A
Turnout		14,522	88.2	+2.2
Conservative gain from Liberal		Swing	+5.2	

Mason

General election December 1910: Coventry
Party	Candidate	Votes	%	±%
Liberal	David Marshall Mason	7,351	51.8	+2.5
Conservative	Kenneth Foster	6,828	48.2	−2.5
Majority		523	3.6	N/A
Turnout		14,179	86.1	−2.1
Liberal gain from Conservative		Swing	+2.5	

General election 1918: Coventry
Party		Candidate	Votes	%	±%
C	Unionist	Edward Manville	17,380	44.8	−3.4
	Labour	R. C. Wallhead	10,298	26.6	New
	Liberal	Courtenay Mansel	4,128	10.7	−41.1
	Independent	Arthur Charles Bannington	3,806	9.8	New
	Independent Liberal	David Marshall Mason	3,145	8.1	−43.7
Majority			7,082	18.2	N/A
Turnout			38,757	62.4	−23.7
	Unionist gain from Liberal		Swing		
C indicates candidate endorsed by the coalition government.

Mason had opposed the war and was replaced as Liberal candidate by Mansel who supported the Coalition Government. Bannington was the candidate of the National Federation of Discharged and Demobilized Sailors and Soldiers.

=== Elections in the 1920s ===
General election 1922: Coventry
Party	Candidate	Votes	%	±%
Unionist	Edward Manville	20,986	42.6	−2.2
Labour	Robert Williams	16,289	33.1	+6.5
Liberal	John Edward Darnton	11,985	24.3	+13.6
Majority		4,697	9.5	−8.7
Turnout		49,260	80.8	+18.4
Unionist hold		Swing	-4.3	

General election 1923: Coventry
Party	Candidate	Votes	%	±%
Labour	A. A. Purcell	16,346	34.2	+1.1
Unionist	Edward Manville	15,726	32.9	−9.7
Liberal	Henry Paterson Gisborne	15,716	32.9	+8.6
Majority		620	1.3	N/A
Turnout		47,788	77.1	−3.7
Labour gain from Unionist		Swing	+5.4	

General election 1924: Coventry
Party	Candidate	Votes	%	±%
Unionist	Archibald Boyd-Carpenter	22,712	42.4	+9.5
Labour	A. A. Purcell	17,888	33.4	−0.8
Liberal	Henry Paterson Gisborne	12,953	24.2	−8.7
Majority		620	9.0	N/A
Turnout		53,553	84.9	+7.8
Unionist gain from Labour		Swing	+5.4	

General election 1929: Coventry
Party	Candidate	Votes	%	±%
Labour	Philip Noel-Baker	34,255	49.4	+16.0
Unionist	Archibald Boyd-Carpenter	22,536	32.5	−9.9
Liberal	James Wiseman McKay	12,516	18.1	−6.1
Majority		11,719	16.9	N/A
Turnout		69,307	82.2	−2.7
Labour gain from Unionist		Swing	+13.0	

=== Elections in the 1930s ===
General election 1931: Coventry
Party	Candidate	Votes	%	±%
Conservative	William Strickland	44,305	61.0	+28.5
Labour	Philip Noel-Baker	28,311	39.0	−10.4
Majority		15,994	22.0	N/A
Turnout		72,616	82.7	+0.5
Conservative gain from Labour		Swing	+23.4	

General election 1935: Coventry
Party	Candidate	Votes	%	±%
Conservative	William Strickland	37,313	51.7	−9.3
Labour	Philip Noel-Baker	34,841	48.3	+9.3
Majority		2,472	3.4	−18.6
Turnout		72,154	81.0	−1.7
Conservative hold		Swing	-9.3	
