= Edith Finch, Countess of Aylesford =

English noblewoman (1854–1897)

The Right Honourable The Countess of Aylesford
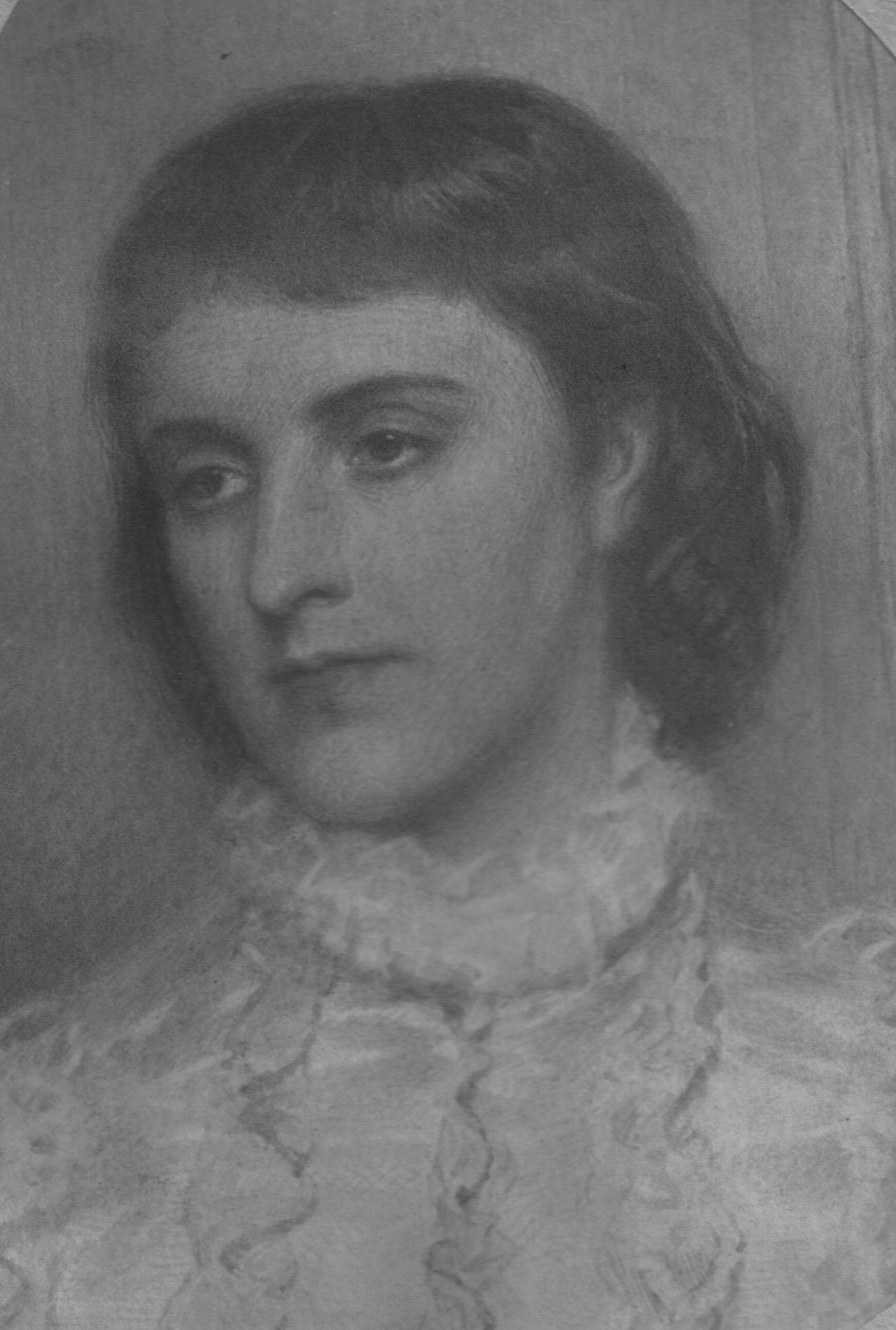

Personal details
- Born: c. 1854
- Died: 23 June 1897 London, England
- Spouse: Heneage Finch, 7th Earl of Aylesford (m. 1871)
- Children: 2
- Parent: Thomas Peers Williams (father)

Edith Finch, Countess of Aylesford (née Williams, c. 1854 – 23 June 1897) was an English noblewoman. She was Countess of Aylesford as the wife of Heneage Finch, 7th Earl of Aylesford and is known for the Aylesford Affair, a society scandal which involved her relationships with George Spencer-Churchill, Marquess of Blandford (later the 8th Duke of Marlborough) and Edward VII, then Prince of Wales and future King of the United Kingdom.

== Biography ==
Lady Aylesford was born in 1854. Her parents were the politician, military officer and landowner Thomas Peers Williams and his wife Emily Williams (née Bacon). Her siblings were Owen Lewis Cope Williams, Margaret Elizabeth Williams, Emily Gwendoline Williams, Blanche Mary Williams, Thomas Anthony Hwfa Williams and Evelyn Katrine Gwenfra Williams. Her grandfathers were politician Owen Williams and industrialist Anthony Bushby Bacon.

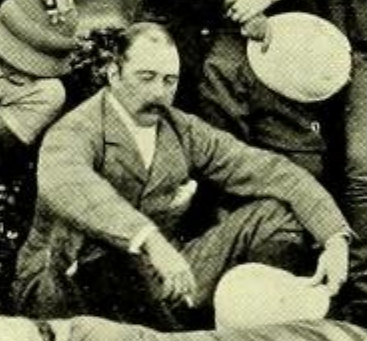
Her husband, Heneage Finch, 7th Earl of Aylesford

Lady Aylesford married Heneage Finch, then Lord Guernsey, on 8 January 1871 at St. George's Church, Hanover Square, London. Her husband succeeded his father, Heneage Finch, 6th Earl of Aylesford, as the 7th Earl of Aylesford only two days after their marriage. The Earl and Countess moved in the Marlborough House Set social circle. They had two daughters together: Hilda Johannah Gwendolen Finch (1872–1931) who married Malcolm Donald Murray, and Alexandra Louise Minna Finch (1875–1959) who married Philip Samuel Danby, was widowed and later married Robert Emmet.

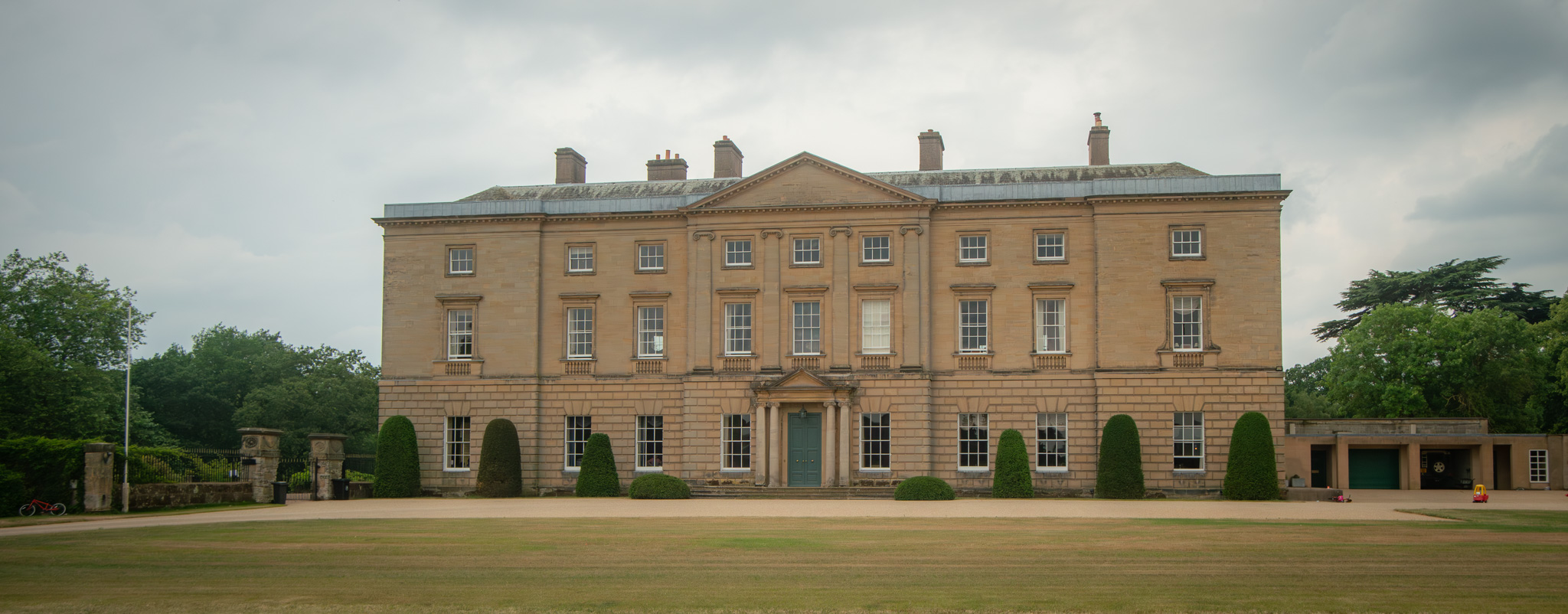
The Aylesford family seat, Packington Hall in Great Packington, Warwickshire

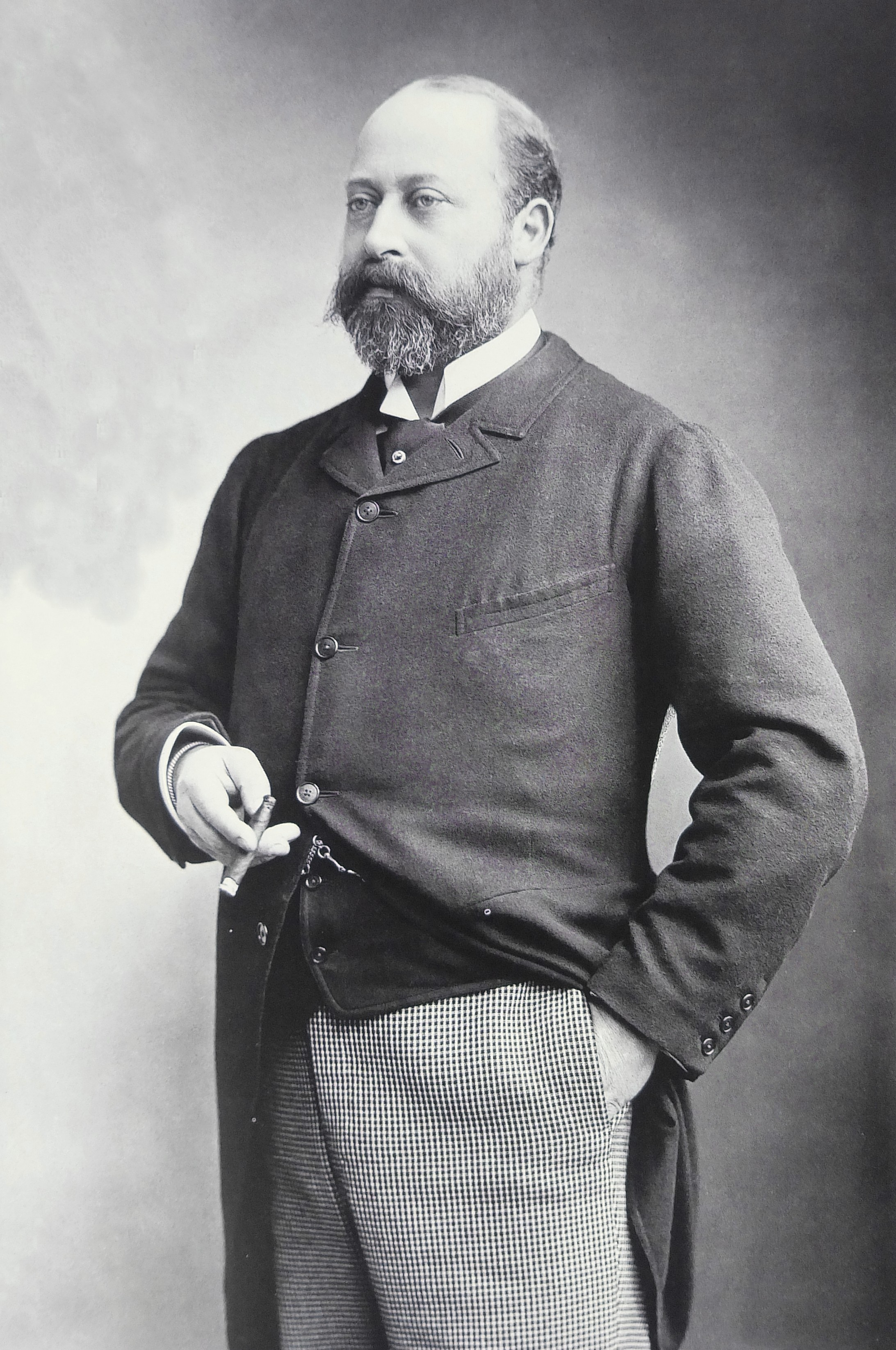
Prince Edward (1894)

In 1874 Edward, Prince of Wales and his wife Princess Alexandra of Denmark visited the Aylesford seat at Packington Hall in Great Packington, Warwickshire, and were lavishly entertained. Lady Aylesford conducted a brief affair with Edward, which her husband overlooked and tolerated. While her husband was accompanying Edward on a goodwill visit to India, Lady Aylesford began an affair with George Spencer-Churchill, Marquess of Blandford. She wrote a letter to her husband in India to say that she had left home and intended to divorce him to marry Spencer-Churchill. He telegraphed his mother Jane, Dowager Countess of Aylesford, to remove his daughters from their mother: "send for the children and keep them until my return: a great misfortune has happened". He left the royal tour early and returned home, intending to divorce Lady Aylesford.

The Dowager Countess was reluctant to remove her grandchildren from their mother before receiving the full facts of the situation, but afterwards took Hilda and Alexandra to live with her, and they were not permitted to see their mother again. In 1885 Jane said: "they have never seen their mother since then, and they do not know that she is alive." Lady Aylesford petitioned at Chancery to gain access to her daughters, but was refused.

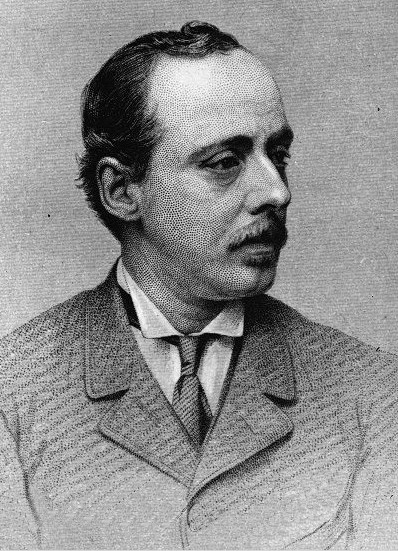
George Spencer-Churchill

Lady Aylesford wrote to her mother-in-law in March 1876 to explain why she had left home:

"I do not attempt to say a word in self-defence, but you can imagine I have suffered much before I could have taken such a step: how much it would be impossible to tell you, but it is the only reparation I can make to Guernsey, and he will now have the opportunity of getting rid of one he has long ceased to care for."

Lady Aylesford and George Spencer-Churchill spent some time living together at the Hotel de Rivoli in Paris, assuming the disguise of a married couple named Spencer. She gave birth to an illegitimate son in 1881, who was registered with the French authorities as Guy Bertrand of unnamed parents. He was christened on 29 June 1883 in London as Guy Bertram Finch, however despite being baptised as a child of the Earl of Aylesford, Guy was assumed based on various witness testimony to be the son of the Marquess of Blandford and the House of Lords refused Guy Bertrand the inheritance of the title Earl of Aylesford.

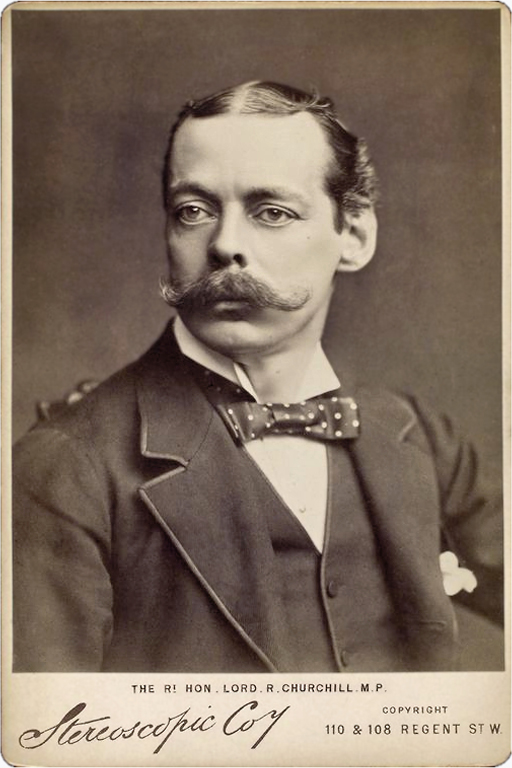
Randolph Churchill

To avoid the scandal of divorce, Randolph Spencer-Churchill attempted to defend his brother George's honour. Randolph believed that Prince Edward had also been conducting an affair with Lady Aylesford, and threatened to make public affectionate letters that Prince Edward had sent to her and subpoena him in any Aylesford divorce proceedings if Prince Edward did not try to prevent the divorce. Angry, Prince Edward wanted to duel Randolph, but ultimately referred the matter to his mother Queen Victoria, who with Prime Minister Benjamin Disraeli's assistance appointed Randolph to a political role in Ireland (considered to be a form of exile) and urged the Finches to reconcile. Lady Aylesford's husband eventually dropped the divorce suit and they formally separated in 1877, but remained married until his death in 1885.

George Spencer-Churchill and his first wife Lady Albertha Frances Anne Hamilton, divorced in 1883, shortly after he became Duke of Marlborough, but once single, George did not marry Lady Aylesford; instead he married Jane Lillian Warren Price (widow of Louis Hammersley of New York). Socially ostracized, abandoned by Spencer-Churchill and without any money of her own, Lady Aylesford spent the last years of her life in poverty. She died in Welbeck Street, London, on 24 June 1897, aged 51, after a short illness.

== In popular culture ==
Lady Aylesford was played by Philippa Markham in the television series Jennie, Lady Randolph Churchill (1974). She was played by Teresa White in the television series Edward the Seventh (1975).
