= Heneage Finch, 7th Earl of Aylesford =

British aristocrat (1849–1885)

The Right Honourable The Earl of Aylesford
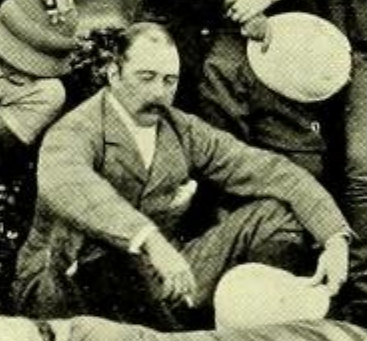
- Predecessor: Heneage Finch, 6th Earl of Aylesford
- Successor: Charles Wightwick Finch, 8th Earl of Aylesford
- Born: 21 February 1849; St George Hanover Square, England
- Died: 13 January 1885 (aged 35); Big Spring, Texas, United States
- Buried: St James' Church, Great Packington
- Spouse: Edith Peers Williams
- Issue: Lady Hilda Johannah Gwendolen Murray; Lady Alexandra Louise Minna Emmet
- Father: Heneage Finch, 6th Earl of Aylesford
- Mother: Jane Wightwick Knightley
- Occupation: Member of the House of Lords; Stud owner and horse racing sponsor; Cattle rancher

Heneage Finch, 7th Earl of Aylesford (21 February 1849 – 13 January 1885), styled Lord Guernsey until 1871, and also known as Joseph Heneage Finch, was a British aristocrat and friend of the Prince of Wales (later King Edward VII). Finch enjoyed many outdoor pursuits, and in his social circle was nicknamed "Sporting Joe."

The Aylesford Scandal, a British society scandal of 1876, as well as financial difficulties, led to Finch leaving the United Kingdom to become a cattle rancher in Big Spring, Texas.

== Family ==
Arms of Finch: Argent, a chevron between three griffins passant sable

Finch's parents were Heneage Finch, 6th Earl of Aylesford, and Jane Wightwick Knightley, the only daughter of John Wightwick Knightley of Offchurch Bury: they were married on 7 May 1846. Finch's family had a residence in Upper Brook Street, Mayfair, and he was born in St George Hanover Square, a historical parish that included the Mayfair district, on 21 February 1849. He was baptised at St George's on 15 March 1849. Finch had five siblings: Charles Wightwick (1851–1924), Anna Francesca Wilhelmina (1853–1933), Daniel Harry (1858–1890), Clement Edward (1861–1895) and George Cecil Moyle (1864–1865) He was educated at Eton.

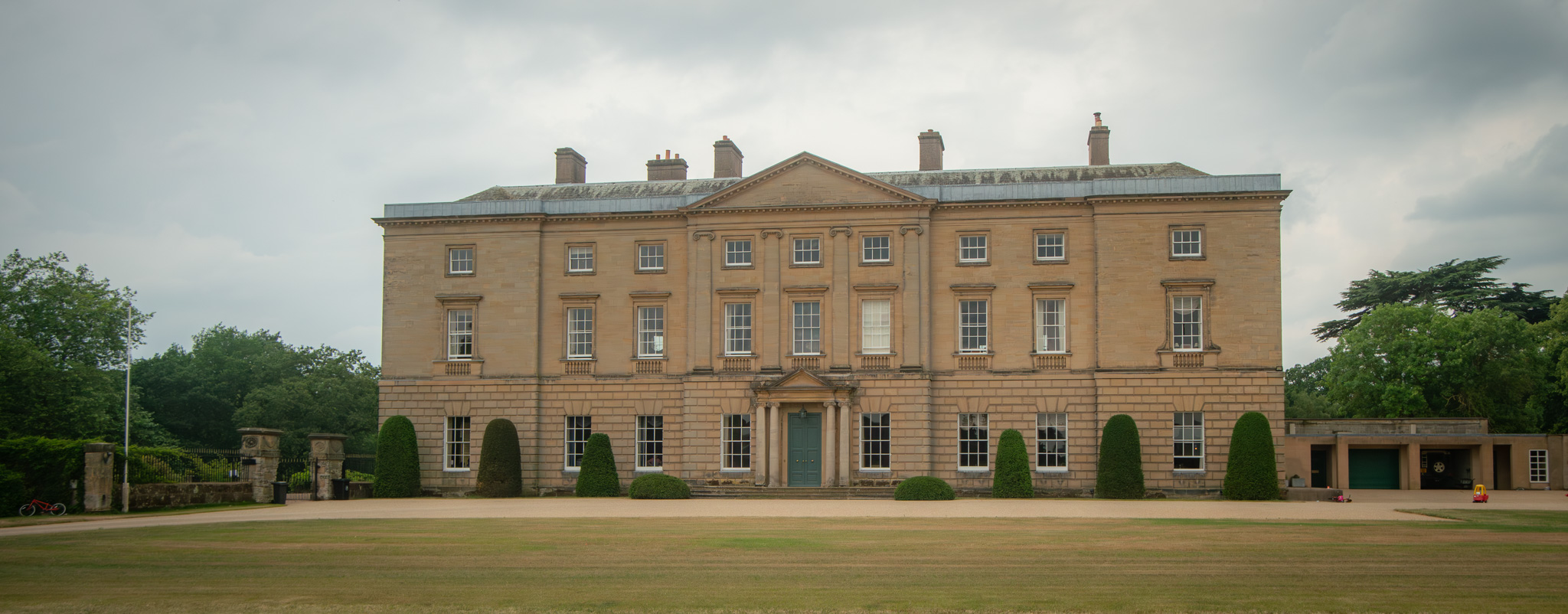
The Aylesford family seat, Packington Hall in Warwickshire

On the death of his father on 10 January 1871, Finch succeeded to the title of Earl of Aylesford. He had married Edith Peers Williams only two days before, on 8 January 1871. Edith was the third daughter of Thomas Peers Williams and his wife Emily (née Bacon).

Edith and Finch had two daughters: Hilda Johannah Gwendolen (1872–1931) who married Malcolm Donald Murray, and Alexandra Louise Minna (1875–1959) who married Philip Samuel Danby, was widowed and later married Robert Emmet.

== "Sporting Joe" ==
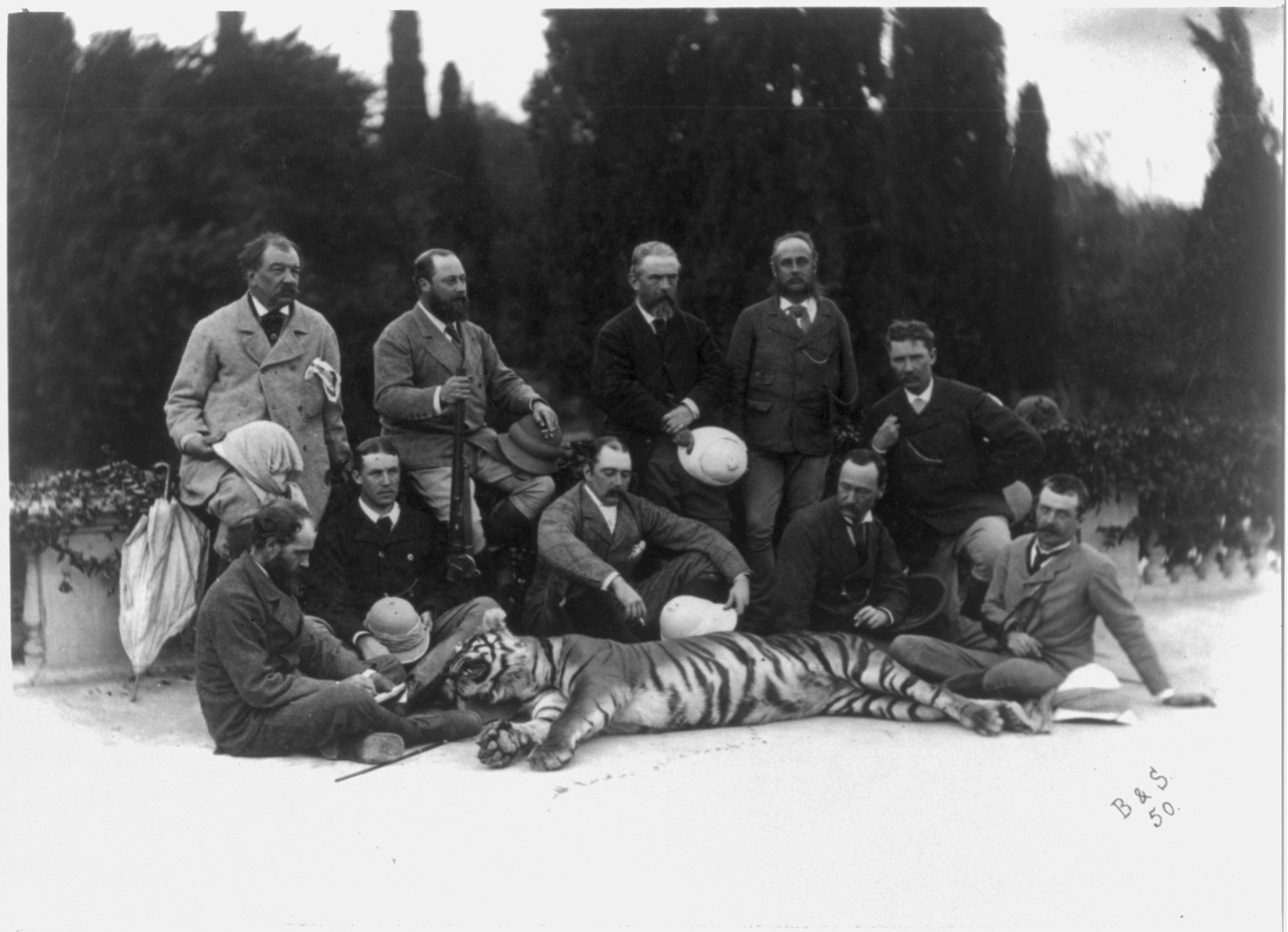
Albert Edward, Prince of Wales (back row, second from left) and his hunting party in India in 1875, with the first tiger killed by the Prince. Lord Aylesford is seated on the ground in the middle of the front row

Despite his public position, Finch did not participate in politics to any major extent. In the 14 years in which he was a member of the House of Lords, Hansard does not record Finch as contributing to any debates. Hansard did not have comprehensive coverage before 1909. Finch was a captain of the Warwickshire Yeomanry Cavalry. He was also a county magistrate, but rarely presided over cases.

Much of Finch's participation in public life involved outdoor pursuits, including fox hunting as a member of the North Warwickshire hounds and athletic feats such as challenging local tradesmen in Warwickshire to running races, sometimes giving the winnings to charity: Finch took part in a 100-yard race on 5 June 1874 against a Master Butcher of Leamington which took place at 3 a.m. in Warwick High Street, the prize being two bottles of champagne. Finch was once described as "as fine a specimen of manhood as one often encounters," a well built man, standing 6 feet 2 inches tall in his stockings. Finch was skilled at boxing, and was particularly interested in horse racing and breeding.

=== Boxing ===
Finch had received boxing training from a retired pugilist and he reportedly boasted that he could "handle the daddles". On an occasion at the Packington Steeplechases a gang of thieves attempted to steal some ancestral silver tableware from Finch's tent, and he fought them off largely single handed.

=== Horse racing ===
Finch was elected a member of the jockey club in 1875, and sometimes rode or sponsored horses under the name "Mr Gillman". Finch ran a racing stud from 1871, which was managed by Captain Octavius Machell. Finch's racing colours were yellow and violet sleeves. Many of Finch's horses were sold by auction in 1873 for less than what he had paid for them. Some well-known horses that were at one time owned by Finch include Acropolis, Algérie, Bonnie Dundee, Butress, Chandos, Chausseur, Claremont (came second in the 1875 Derby, which was won by Gusztáv Batthyány's stallion Galopin), Colonel Crockett, Creon, Dhawalgirl, Flash, Glenorchie, Hermitage, Killingholme, Knight of the Garter, Lady Hilda, Leveret, Lillington (a winner at Birmingham), Little Retty, Lord Darnley, Lord of the Mines, Lowlander, Marfiori, Mexborough, Noyre Tauren, Pain Killer, Petrel, Queensland, Redivivus, Regal (on whom Finch won a private sweepstake at Stockbridge in 1875), Reugny (winner of the Grand National in 1874 after passing out of Finch's ownership), Rose of Athol (won the Great Yorkshire Stakes in 1871), St. Pancras, Sir George, Soapsuds, Vanderdecken (Vanderdecken won the Liverpool Cup in 1872), Violetta, and Wentworth.

== Pranks and public altercations ==
Finch was reported upon in newspapers on several occasions for prankish and sometimes violent behaviour. Circa July 1871, shortly after succeeding his father as Earl, 22-year old Finch was fined 40 shillings by Richmond Magistrates for throwing flour over people in the streets of Richmond. Finch then switched to throwing flour at the citizens of Hammersmith and was fined another 40 shillings.

Finch reportedly wished to witness an execution and petitioned the Governor of Warwick Prison to be allowed to attend one, but was refused, the Governor saying that an exception could not be made even for an Earl [public executions had been abolished in the United Kingdom after the Capital Punishment Amendment Act 1868]. Finch ordered six Brougham carriages to wait outside the Prison for the journalists who had been allowed to witness the execution, to drive them back to Warwick town in state.

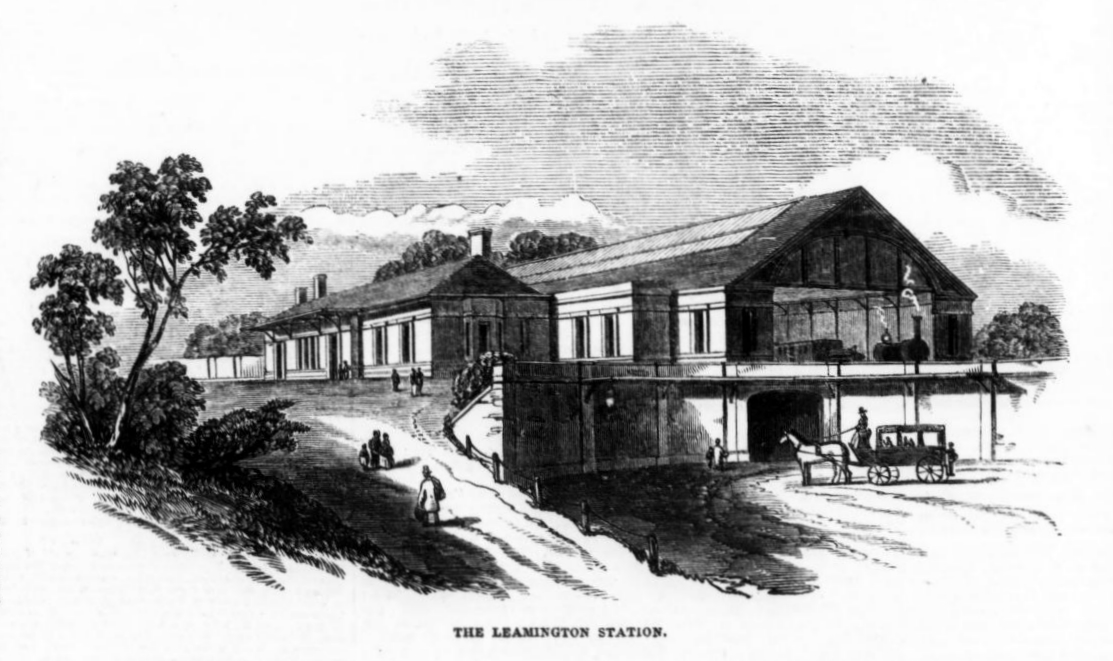
The original Leamington station of the Great Western Railway, the site of Finch's thwarted attempt to greet Queen Victoria with his Yeomanry troop in 1874.

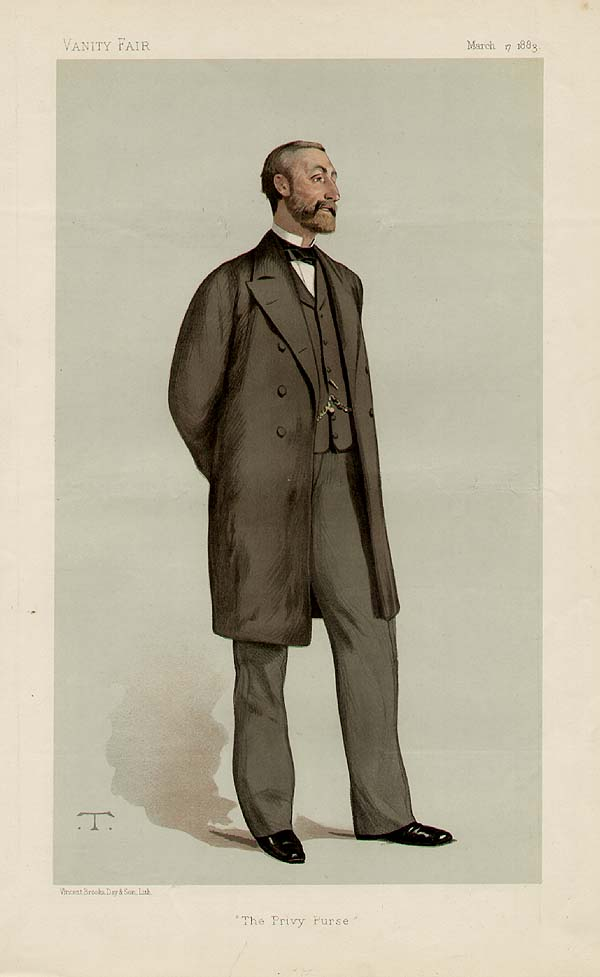
Major-General Henry Ponsonby (1825–1895), Private Secretary to Queen Victoria, whose intervention defused the situation at Leamington railway station

In 1874 Finch was said to have committed 'an indiscretion' towards officials at Leamington railway station, and it was stated that he had made a payment to apologise. The Birmingham Daily Post reported that while Queen Victoria's train had been waiting at Leamington station on Wednesday 20 May 1874, Finch had arrived with his local Yeomanry Company to give the Queen an Honour Guard. The Company arrived at Leamington station at around 10 p.m., and Finch had been refused entry by station porters due to the Queen's wish for privacy. Finch had dismounted his horse to try to gain admittance and 'an unseemly hand to hand struggle ensued.' The Kenilworth Advertiser reported that one witness claimed to have seen a Yeomanry member with a sword drawn threatening to cut down a station porter, though the Advertiser's reporter hoped this was an exaggeration. The incident was discussed In the House of Commons on 4 June 1874: MP Lewis Dillwyn raised a question about reports of the event. The Minister of War Gathorne Gathorne-Hardy explained that enquiries had been made of the parties concerned, and that Finch's Yeomanry had waited 'perfectly quiet' outside the station while Finch had tried to gain admittance, but Finch had resisted when physically restrained by station staff. Finch had extricated himself, and then spoke with the Queen's Private Secretary General Ponsonby though the station's railings, who told him: "Her Majesty did not wish to hurt his feelings at all, but wished that her stay in the station should be quite private," after which Finch and his company had withdrawn. An obituary for Finch asserted that the compensation payment made at the time was because Finch had punched the Station Master [the original Leamington railway station buildings were demolished in the 1930s: the modern Leamington Spa railway station is now on the same site].

In January 1879 Finch appeared at Bow Street Police Court charged with assaulting two officials named Richards and Campbell at the Royal Italian Opera House, Covent Garden, when the officials would not admit him to his box without a ticket. Finch had pushed Campbell to the ground; Richards escaped serious injury as Finch had knocked off his hat rather than directly striking his head. Finch was fined £5 for assaulting each man (£10 total).

In June 1879 Finch was summoned to Police Court at Ascot Heath for 'a jocose attempt' to hit a police officer on the helmet from his barouche carriage on the way out of Ascot Races: Finch had missed his aim and struck the officer on the cheek. As Finch had not intended injury, the summons was withdrawn.

On a brief return to England from Texas, on 28 May 1884, Finch attended the Epsom Derby and broke a leg on his railway journey back to London Bridge. Accounts as to exactly what happened vary: St Louis Post Dispatch reported that Finch had assaulted a railway porter by striking the porter on the head with his cane when asked to show his ticket, the altercation leading to a fall and Finch's leg being broken in two places. The Yorkshire Post gave an account from London Bridge railway station officials: that a man travelling on the 11.40 p.m. train from Epsom had refused to show his ticket, and had instead attempted twice to strike a Ticket Inspector on the head; the Inspector had warded off the passenger's blows and pushed him down, after which the injured man was assisted to a Cab and had given the name 'Lord Aylesford' which they had thought at the time was an assumed name. Alternatively, Finch had perhaps fallen asleep on the train and his unconscious frame had blocked a female passenger's exit from their carriage: in that version of events Finch met his accident while a porter tried to help the woman get out of the train. Finch contended that he had been assaulted by a railway official, and through his solicitor appealed for witnesses. Finch was attended by Dr Alfred Cooper while he recovered.

== Financial problems ==
Finch was known throughout his life for his personal generosity, but this was coupled with youthful "folly and extravagance" and he had accrued substantial debt against future income from his family's estates before reaching the age of majority: In 1873 Finch went to the Lord Chancellor's Court seeking legal assistance concerning an unfavourable loan agreement he had made before reaching the age of 21, with a money-lender named Morris: Finch had borrowed £8,000, partly to repay a £4,000 debt which he owed to a solicitor named Mr. Graham. Finch's debt had subsequently increased to £11,000. Finch had concealed his debt problems from his father due to his father's terminal illness, and he found he could not make any further promises against future income from family estates without alerting the family solicitor who held the title deeds. The Court decided that Finch should still repay the debt, but at an interest rate of 4% rather than Morris' previous interest rate of 60%.

In December 1880 Finch instigated legal action at Coleshill Police Court against a man named Cox who said that Finch owed him money, as Cox had arranged for Bailiffs to visit Packington Hall on 24 November 1880 and Finch felt the Bailiffs had caused a breach of the peace, though a defence of the house had been undertaken by his staff. The summons against Cox was ultimately dismissed.

Towards the end of his life Finch was described as 'financially embarrassed' and a Private Act was passed to settle his affairs. By 1884 The Liverpool Mercury reported that Finch at one time had the reputation of being "the greatest spendthrift in Europe." Another newspaper noted that the Aylesford family estates had yielded about £30,000 a year when Finch inherited them, but that he had been in a dire financial situation by the time he emigrated to the U.S.A. The Yorkshire Gazette summed up Finch's contradictory attitude to his finances:

"Ever impulsive and headstrong, he was yet generous to a fault, and the embarrassments in which he became involved, and which eventually crushed him down so completely that he was compelled to leave England, were probably due more to his open-handed liberality and reckless consideration for other interests than his own than to base profligacy and ruinous wantoness. Now and again he threw about money as though it were mere trash, though sometimes he was remarkably careful in financial affairs, and betrayed a shrewdness and thrift which struck his friends with amazement."

== Friendship with Edward, Prince of Wales and Tour of India, 1875–1876 ==
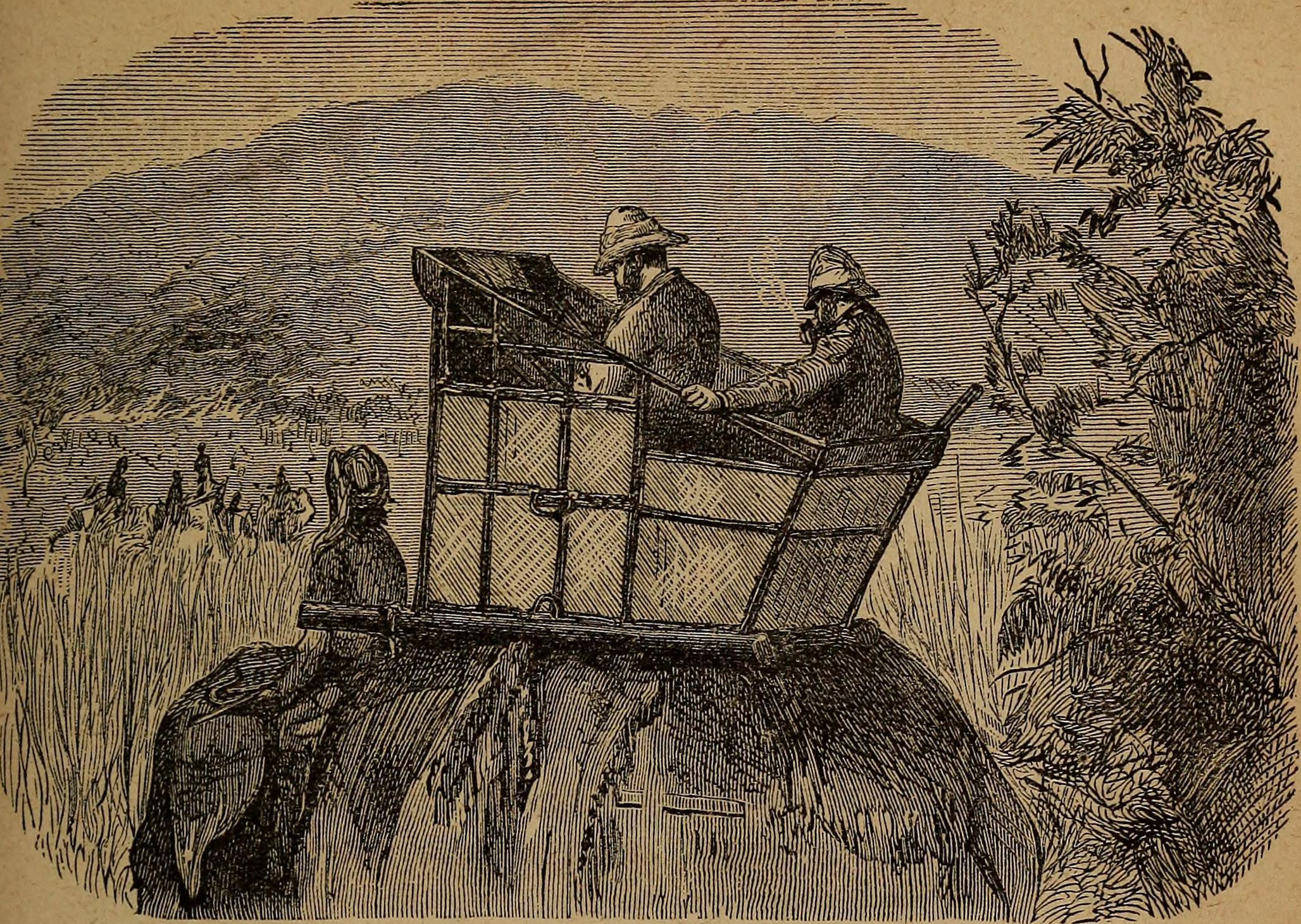
The Prince of Wales on his tour of India, "Beating for Tiger in the Terai"

Finch had been presented by his father to Edward, Prince of Wales at a levée at St James's Palace on 19 June 1869. In 1874 Edward, Prince of Wales and Princess Alexandra visited Packington Hall and were lavishly entertained. Finch may have borrowed a lot of money to fund his hospitality for the Royals and one later commentator noted that "after the festivities Lord Aylesford was simply broken."

Finch was selected to accompany Prince Edward on a goodwill visit to India in 1875–1876, and was listed in a contemporary publication by Sir William Howard Russell as acting as an Equerry to the Prince. Prince Edward regularly hunted while he was in India, and Russell implied the presence of Finch and Charles Wynn-Carington, as competent huntsmen, would have added a degree of protection for Edward: "to the anticipation of similar enjoyment in the chase Lord Aylesford and Lord Carington had superadded a task imposed by their personal attachment, which happily had no need for its exercise."

Finch himself partook in the hunting activity: e.g. on Valentine's Day, 14 February 1876 (cited as an "off-day") Finch killed several animals including two mongooses, a para [a deer species, Axis porcinus], one partridge, and three plover. Finch also shot a bear at Tandah.

== Aylesford Scandal ==
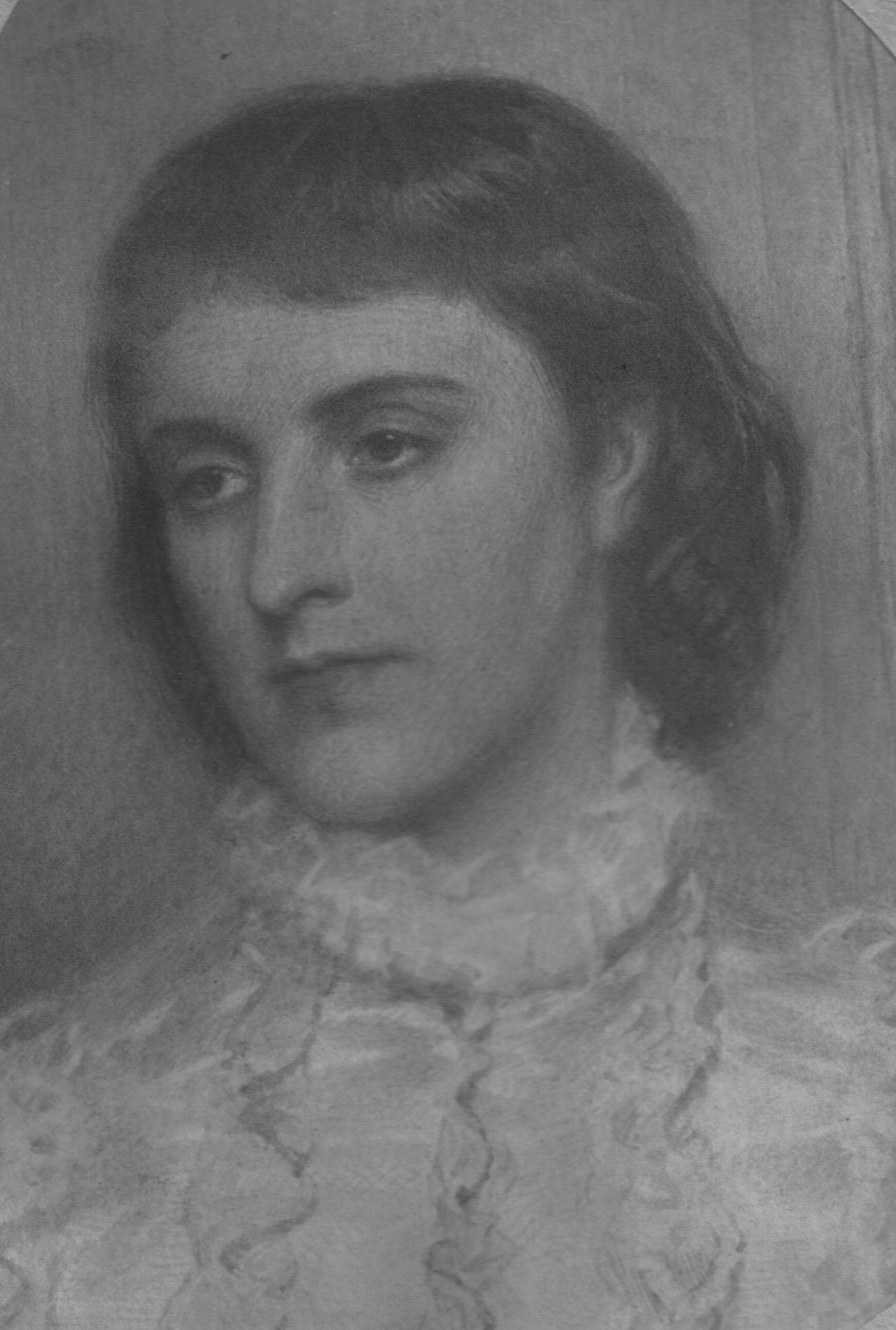
Edith Peers Williams, later Countess of Aylesford

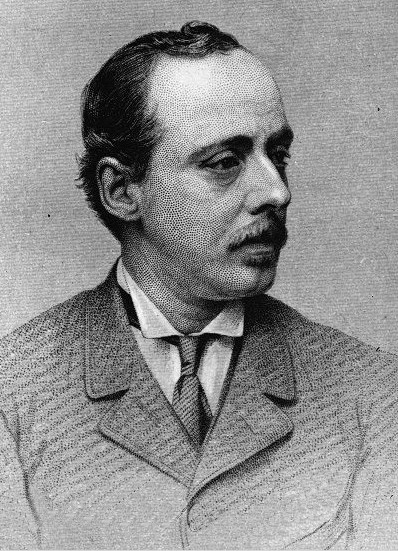
George Charles Spencer-Churchill, Marquess of Blandford, in 1876

While he was in India, Finch's wife Edith wrote him a letter to say that she had left home and intended to divorce him to marry George Spencer-Churchill, then the Marquess of Blandford (1844–1892), who was also already married. Finch telegraphed his mother Jane the dowager Countess of Aylesford to remove his and Edith's daughters from Edith's care: "send for the children and keep them until my return: a great misfortune has happened". Finch left the royal tour and returned to the U.K.

Edith wrote to her mother-in-law in March 1876 to explain why she had left home:

"I do not attempt to say a word in self-defence, but you can imagine I have suffered much before I could have taken such a step: how much it would be impossible to tell you, but it is the only reparation I can make to Guernsey, and he will now have the opportunity of getting rid of one he has long ceased to care for."

The Dowager Countess was reluctant to remove her grandchildren from their mother before receiving the full facts of the situation. but afterwards took Hilda and Alexandra to live with her, and they were not permitted to see Edith again. In 1885 Jane said: "they have never seen their mother since then, and they do not know that she is alive." Edith petitioned at Chancery to gain access to her daughters, but was refused.

Edith had left her most valuable diamond jewellery behind for her children, not feeling she was entitled to take it, an assertion that was corroborated by James James, Finch's House Steward, who had seen Edith depositing items in Packington Hall's strong room before she left.

Edith and George Spencer-Churchill spent some time living together at the Hotel de Rivoli in Paris, assuming the disguise of a married couple named Spencer.

To avoid the scandal of divorce, Randolph Spencer-Churchill attempted to defend his brother George's honour. Randolph believed that Prince Edward had also been conducting an affair with Countess Edith, and threatened to make public affectionate letters that Prince Edward had sent to Edith and subpoena him in potential Aylesford divorce proceedings if Prince Edward did not try to prevent the divorce. An angry Prince Edward wanted to duel Randolph, but ultimately referred the matter to his mother Queen Victoria, who with Benjamin Disraeli's assistance appointed Randolph to a political role in Ireland (considered to be a form of exile) and urged the Finches to reconcile, although the Queen had a poor opinion of Edith's family.

Finch went to the Divorce Section of the High Court to secure a divorce from Edith on the grounds of adultery, but Edith's representatives argued that Finch himself had also committed adultery, and a team including the Attorney General John Holker intervened on behalf of the Queen's Proctor to detail the countering case: that Finch had committed adultery with a married woman named Mrs Dilke (the Dilke family having been Finch's near neighbours at Maxstoke Castle in Warwickshire), and the distress of the situation had contributed to her husband Mr Dilke's depressive illness, intemperance and suicide. Finch was also accused of compromising his marriage vows early in his union with Edith, by going to the Alhambra or Cremorne Gardens and "supping there with loose women or forming vulgar amours with them."

Edith's representatives did not contest that she had cohabited with George Spencer-Churchill - indeed the couple may have cohabited to create public evidence for a divorce - and although Finch and Mrs Dilke testified in the witness box that they had not engaged in any misconduct, the Jury concluded that Finch had also committed adultery, and that also The Marquess of Blandford and Finch had colluded with each other regarding the divorce case, so a divorce was not granted. Finch and Edith remained married but separated until Finch's death.

A son born to Edith in Paris was registered with the French authorities as Guy Bertrand of unnamed parents. Guy Bertrand (born 4 November 1881, died 31 March 1950) was christened on 29 June 1883 in London as Guy Bertram Finch, however despite being baptised as a child of the Earl of Aylesford, Guy was assumed based on various witness testimony to be the son of the Marquess of Blandford and the House of Lords refused Guy Bertrand the inheritance of the title Earl of Aylesford.

George Spencer-Churchill and his first wife Lady Albertha Frances Anne Hamilton, divorced in 1883 shortly after George became Duke of Marlborough, but once single, George did not marry Edith; instead he married Jane Lillian Warren Price (widow of Louis Hammersley of New York), and she became Duchess of Marlborough. Edith had confided in her baby nurse Mrs Brittain that she had suffered physical difficulties from 'mysterious pain' after the birth of Guy Bertrand. Edith remained single, living later in life at an estate named Honeys near Waltham St. Lawrence, and died in Welbeck Street, London on 24 June 1897 after a short illness.

== New career in the United States ==
After Finch and Edith had separated, Finch began a new life in the United States as a rancher in Texas. Finch purchased land and a cattle interest for $75,000 at Wild Horse Creek, about ten miles from the town of Big Spring. Finch initially traveled to Texas with his brothers Daniel and Clement, and although Clement returned to England fairly quickly, Daniel stayed to help Finch in his new vocation.

Finch and Daniel were described as popular with the local cowboys, despite some initial teasing, with Finch being nicknamed "The Judge" and Daniel being nicknamed "The Kid." Finch was described as generally well-liked in Texas; and British gossip about Finch did not have influence upon his American neighbours, as frontiersmen did not tend to pry. Newspapers with stories of Countess Edith and her son Guy Bertrand had reached as far as Big Spring by April 1884, but Finch did not read them. Finch stayed out of trouble, although on one occasion he tried to intervene in a bar fight and was hit on the head with a bottle, knocking him flat.

In 1883 Finch built a meat market at Big Spring, which was the town's first permanent masonry building. The building had survived to at least 2018 as the Lone Star Barber Shop, with a later brick frontage, at South Main Street, and it was given a commemorative plaque from the Howard County Historical Commission. The plaque details how Finch was remembered for being very particular about how his meat was prepared, travelling with his own personal butcher named Von Paussen, and being a big fan of mutton.

In April 1884 Finch's ranch house at Big Spring burned to the ground in a fire that had begun as a result of a servant mishandling kerosene. Finch and his brother Daniel escaped the house without injury, but Finch regretted the loss of 20 guns in the fire, including one that had been gifted to him by the Prince of Wales. Finch rode into Big Spring town the next day and obtained permission to occupy the empty property belonging to his neighbour Denmark, until a new cabin could be built for him. An unnamed neighbouring rancher, feeling sorry for the Englishmen, helped with efforts to rebuild their home. Later, Finch purchased and lived in the Cosmopolitan Hotel.

The Texas Historical Commission set a plaque in 1980 on a building on East 3rd Street in Big Spring, at the former site of the Cosmopolitan Hotel, to commemorate Finch's purchase of the hotel and his contribution to the City's history..In all Finch spent about three years in Texas.

== Death and succession ==
Finch had grown increasingly ill during the last year of his life, and he was described as looking more like a man aged 50 than 35.

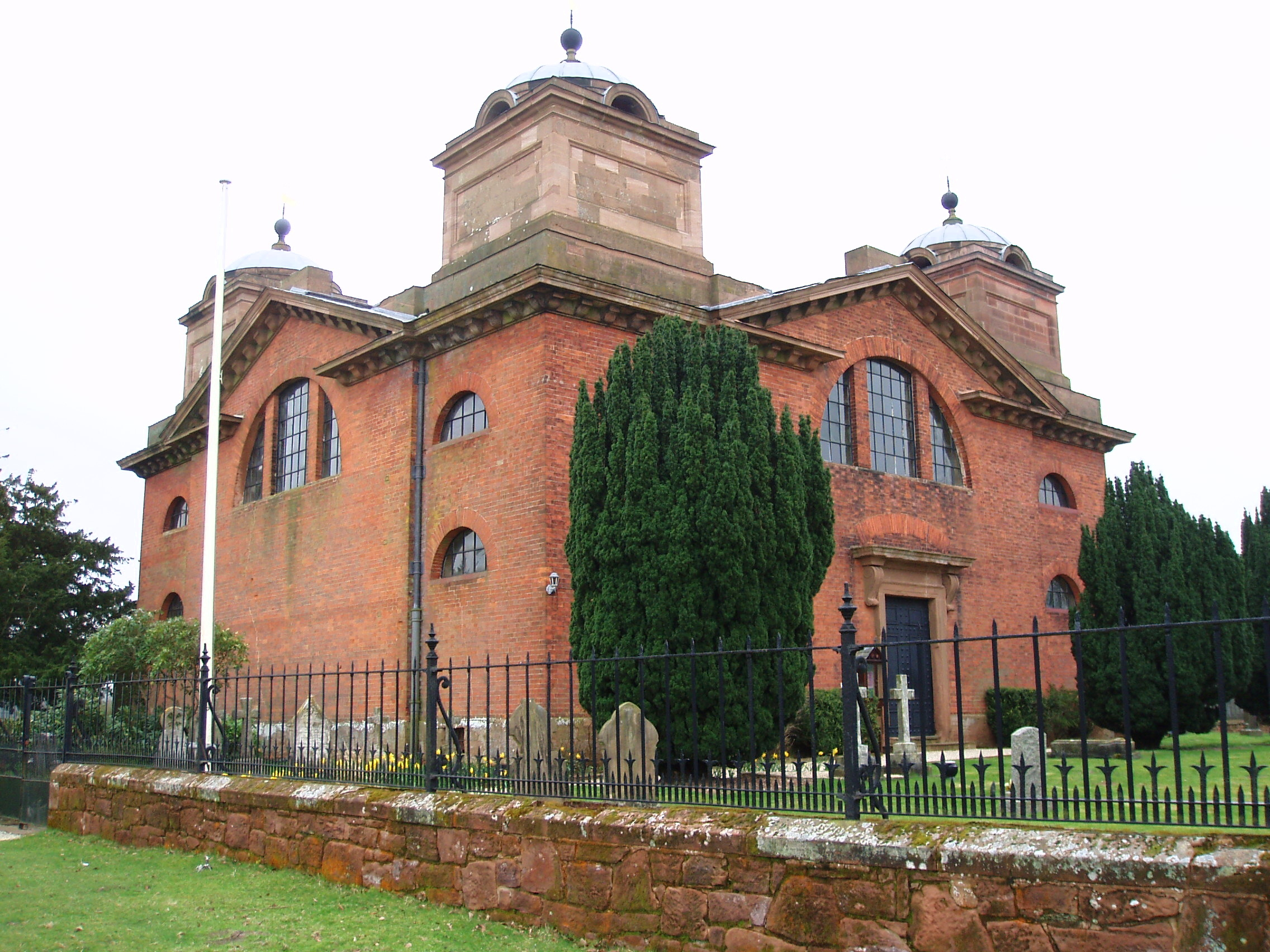
St James' Church, Great Packington, the family chapel of the Earls of Aylesford and the resting place of Joseph Heneage Finch.

Finch died at his ranch at Big Spring at 9.30 p.m. on 13 January 1885. His cause of death was described variously as dropsy (edema) and hardening or cirrhosis of the liver, inflammation of the bowels, peritonitis or the effects of a severe cold. Finch had taken out an £80,000 insurance policy on his own life and a rumour circulated in America that he might have faked his death; however, Finch's mother and his personal physician Alfred Cooper identified Finch's embalmed body when it was conveyed back to England and confirmed that the deceased was indeed Finch.

Finch's body had been brought back to the UK by the White Star Line steamship SS Britannic and met at Liverpool by Charles Wightwick Finch and Daniel Harry Finch, who escorted their brother's coffin back towards Great Packington on the railway. Finch's funeral took place on 3 February 1885. Finch's funeral cortege was headed by 200 of his estate tenants, and he was buried in a private ceremony attended by his family at St James' Church, Great Packington. The Prince of Wales sent a representative, William Molyneux, Lord Sefton, to the service.

Finch's younger brother Charles Wightwick Finch succeeded to the Earldom.
