= Heneage Finch, 5th Earl of Aylesford =

British peer

- Tenure: 21 October 1812 – 3 January 1859
- Predecessor: Heneage Finch, 4th Earl of Aylesford
- Successor: Heneage Finch, 6th Earl of Aylesford
- Other titles: 5th Baron Guernsey, Officer in the Light Dragoons
- Born: 24 April 1786
- Baptised: St James Church, Westminster, England
- Died: 3 January 1859 (aged 72); Great Packington, England
- Buried: St James Church, Great Packington, England
- Residence: Packington Hall, Great Packington, England
- Offices: Member of Parliament for Weobley, Herefordshire
- Noble family: Finch
- Spouse: Lady Augusta Sophia Greville
- Issue: Heneage Finch, 6th Earl of Aylesford, Augusta Legge, Countess of Dartmouth
- Father: Heneage Finch, 4th Earl of Aylesford
- Mother: Lady Louisa Thynne

Heneage Finch, 5th Earl of Aylesford (24 April 1786 – 3 January 1859) was a British peer, the eldest son of Heneage Finch, 4th Earl of Aylesford. He was styled Lord Guernsey until he succeeded his father in 1812.

He attended the University of Oxford, graduating in 1807 with a Bachelor of Arts. He held office as Member of Parliament for Weobley (1807–1812) and was an Officer in the Light Dragoons (1811–1812).

Aylesford married Augusta Sophia Greville, daughter of George Greville, 2nd Earl of Warwick and Henrietta Vernon, on 23 April 1821. Their children were:

1. Augusta Finch, born in 1822. She married her 2nd cousin William Walter Legge, 5th Earl of Dartmouth, and became a philanthropist and Countess of Dartmouth
2. Heneage Finch, 6th Earl of Aylesford, born in 1824. He married Jane Wightwick Knightley.
3. Lieutenant colonel Daniel Greville Finch, born in 1827.
4. Sarah Finch.

He was High Steward of Sutton Coldfield from 1835 until his death and was appointed Fellow of the Society of Antiquaries.

He died on 3 January 1859.

Arms of Finch: Argent, a chevron between three griffins passant sable.

Parliament of the United Kingdom
| Preceded by Lord George Thynne; Robert Steele | Member of Parliament for Weobly; 1807–1812; With: Lord George Thynne | Succeeded by Lord George Thynne; Lord Apsley |
Honorary titles
| Preceded by The Lord Middleton | High Steward of Sutton Coldfield; 1835–1859 | Succeeded by The Lord Leigh |
Peerage of Great Britain
| Preceded by Heneage Finch | Earl of Aylesford; 1812–1859 | Succeeded by Heneage Finch |
