= Packington Old Hall =

Country house in Great Packington, Warwickshire, England

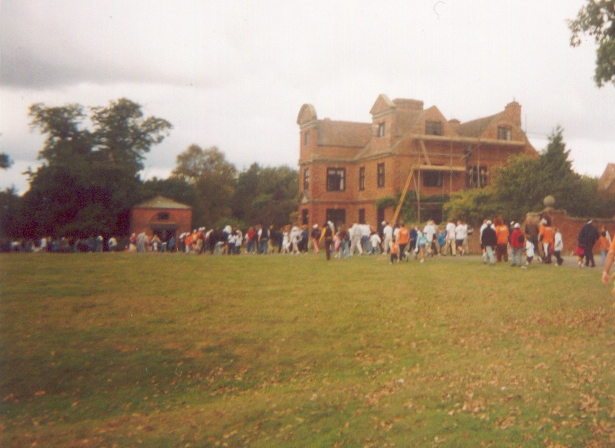
- Interactive map of Packington Old Hall
- 52.4591°N 1.6616°W
- Location: Great Packington, Warwickshire, England

Listed Building – Grade II*
- Official name: Packington Old Hall with walls adjoining on east and west sides, courtyard wall adjoining at rear, and attached outbuildings
- Designated: 11 November 1952
- Reference no.: 1034811

Packington Old Hall is a 17th-century manor house situated at Great Packington, near Meriden, Warwickshire. It is a Grade II* listed building. It stands in gardens enclosed by late 17th century brick walls.

== History ==
The original Packington Manor House (now known as Packington Old Hall) was rebuilt in red brick in 1679 for Sir Clement Fisher, 2nd Baronet, and his wife Jane Lane. In 1690, it was described as ‘a sweet seat, near the road, with a park on the other side, with a fair lodge and an avenue of fir-trees to the hall’.

There is an oblong shaped brick dovecote about 50m away from the Old Hall which was used for housing doves and pigeons. It has over 100 nesting places on three of the walls.

In 1693 Sir Clement Fisher's nephew, also Sir Clement Fisher, 3rd Baronet, built another larger mansion on the estate. The new house became known as Packington Hall and from 1729 the house has been the seat of the Earls of Aylesford.
