= Heneage Finch, 6th Earl of Aylesford =

British peer and politician

- Tenure: 1859-1871
- Predecessor: Heneage Finch, 5th Earl of Aylesford
- Successor: Heneage Finch, 7th Earl of Aylesford
- Other titles: 6th Baron Guernsey
- Born: 24 December 1824; Great Packington, England.
- Died: 10 January 1871 (aged 46); London, England.
- Buried: St James Church, Great Packington
- Residence: Packington Hall, Great Packington
- Offices: Member of Parliament for South Warwickshire
- Spouse: Jane Wightwick Knightley
- Father: Heneage Finch, 5th Earl of Aylesford
- Mother: Augusta Sophia Greville

Arms of Finch: Argent, a chevron between three griffins passant sable

Heneage Finch, 6th Earl of Aylesford DL (24 December 1824 – 10 January 1871), styled Lord Guernsey until 1859, was a British peer and politician.

== Background ==
Born in Packington, Warwickshire, Aylesford was the son of Heneage Finch, 5th Earl of Aylesford and his wife Lady Augusta Sophia, fourth daughter of George Greville, 2nd Earl of Warwick.

== Cricket ==
A keen amateur cricketer, Aylesford played mostly for the Marylebone Cricket Club, but also played for other teams. He made 21 appearances, scoring 200 runs at an average of 7.14, with a high score of 28 not out.

== Political career ==
Finch became a major of the Warwickshire Yeomanry Cavalry in 1848 and represented the county as Deputy Lieutenant from 1852. He entered the British House of Commons in 1849, sitting for Warwickshire South until 1857. Two years later, he succeeded his father in the earldom and took his seat in the House of Lords.

== Family ==
Lord Aylesford married Jane Wightwick Knightley (1827–1911), only daughter and heiress of John Wightwick Knightley of Offchurch Bury in Warwickshire, in 1846.

They had two sons and one daughter:

- Joseph Heneage Finch, 7th Earl of Aylesford.
- Charles Wightwick Finch, 8th Earl of Aylesford.
- Anne Francesca Wilhelmina Finch.

He died in London in January 1871, aged 46, and was succeeded in the earldom by his eldest son, Heneage. The Countess of Aylesford died in October 1911.

Parliament of the United Kingdom
Preceded by Evelyn Shirley; Lord Brooke	Member of Parliament for Warwickshire South; 1849–1857; With: Lord Brooke 1849–1853; Evelyn Shirley 1853–1857	Succeeded by Evelyn Shirley; Edward Bolton King
Peerage of Great Britain
Preceded by Heneage Finch	Earl of Aylesford; 1859–1871	Succeeded by Heneage Finch
