= Knightley baronets of Offchurch (1660) =

Escutcheon of the Knightley baronets of Offchurch

The Knightley baronetcy, of Offchurch in the County of Warwick, was created in the Baronetage of England on 30 August 1660 for John Knightley, of a junior branch of the Knightley family seated at Offchurch Bury. He married Bridget Lewknor, daughter of the courtier Lewis Lewknor.

Either the 1st Baronet, or his son the 2nd Baronet of the same name, was High Sheriff of Warwickshire in 1664. The title became extinct on the death of the 2nd Baronet in 1689.

== Knightley baronets, of Offchurch (1660) ==
- Sir John Knightley, 1st Baronet (c. 1611–c. 1670)
- Sir John Knightley, 2nd Baronet (died 1689)
