= Knightley baronets =

Set index for Knightley baronets

There have been two baronetcies created for members of the Knightley family, one in the Baronetage of England and one in the Baronetage of Great Britain. Both creations are extinct.

- Knightley baronets of Offchurch (1660)
- Knightley baronets of Fawsley (1798)
