= Offchurch Bury =

House in Offchurch, Warwickshire, England

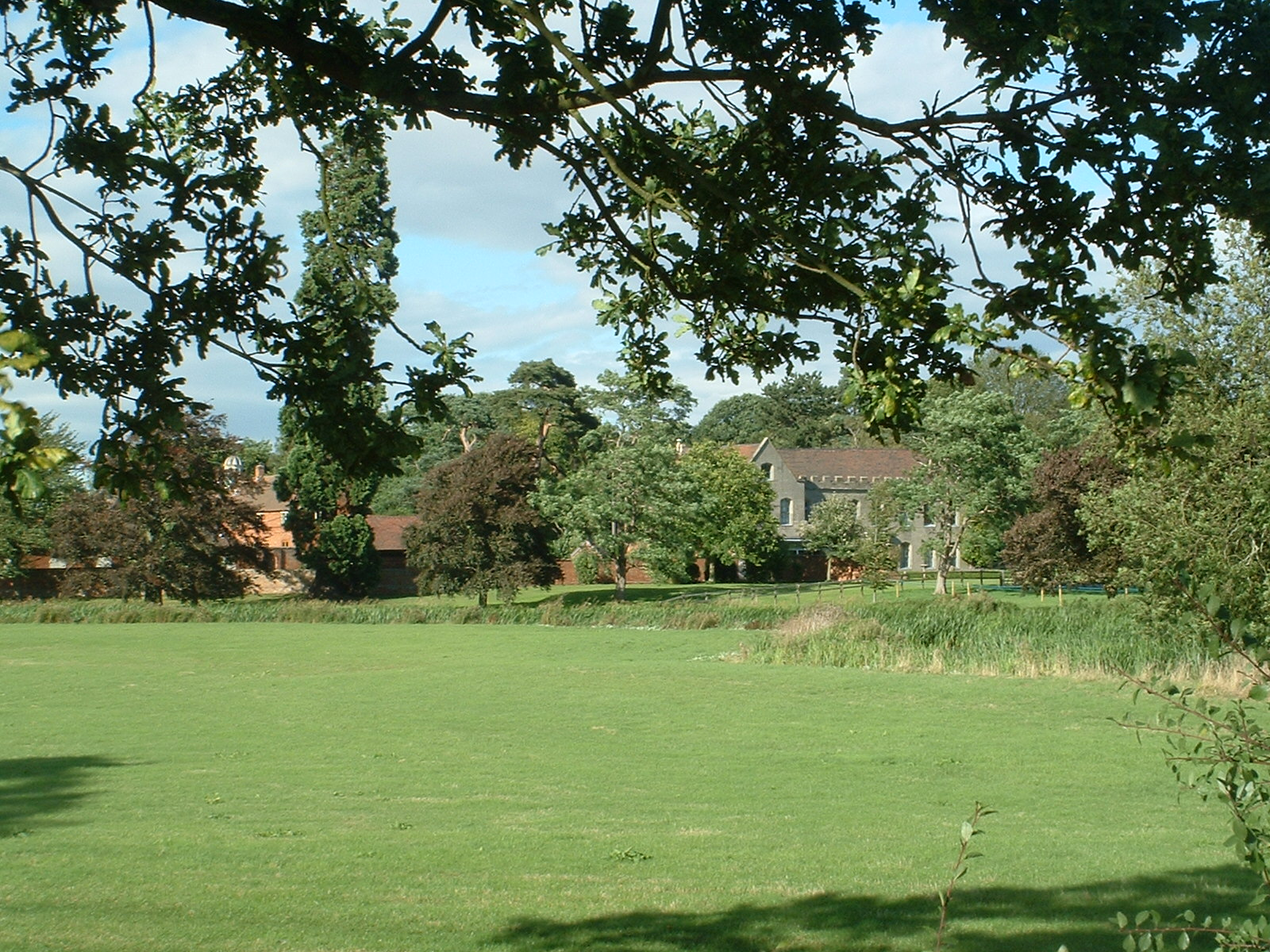
- Offchurch Bury today viewed from the south-west
- Interactive map of Offchurch Bury
- 52.291582°N 1.495454°W
- Location: Offchurch, Warwickshire, England

Listed Building – Grade II*
- Official name: Offchurch Bury
- Designated: 11 April 1967
- Reference no.: 1035085

Listed Building – Grade II
- Official name: Offchurch Bury: Stable Block approximately 30 metres north west
- Designated: 11 April 1967
- Reference no.: 1300168

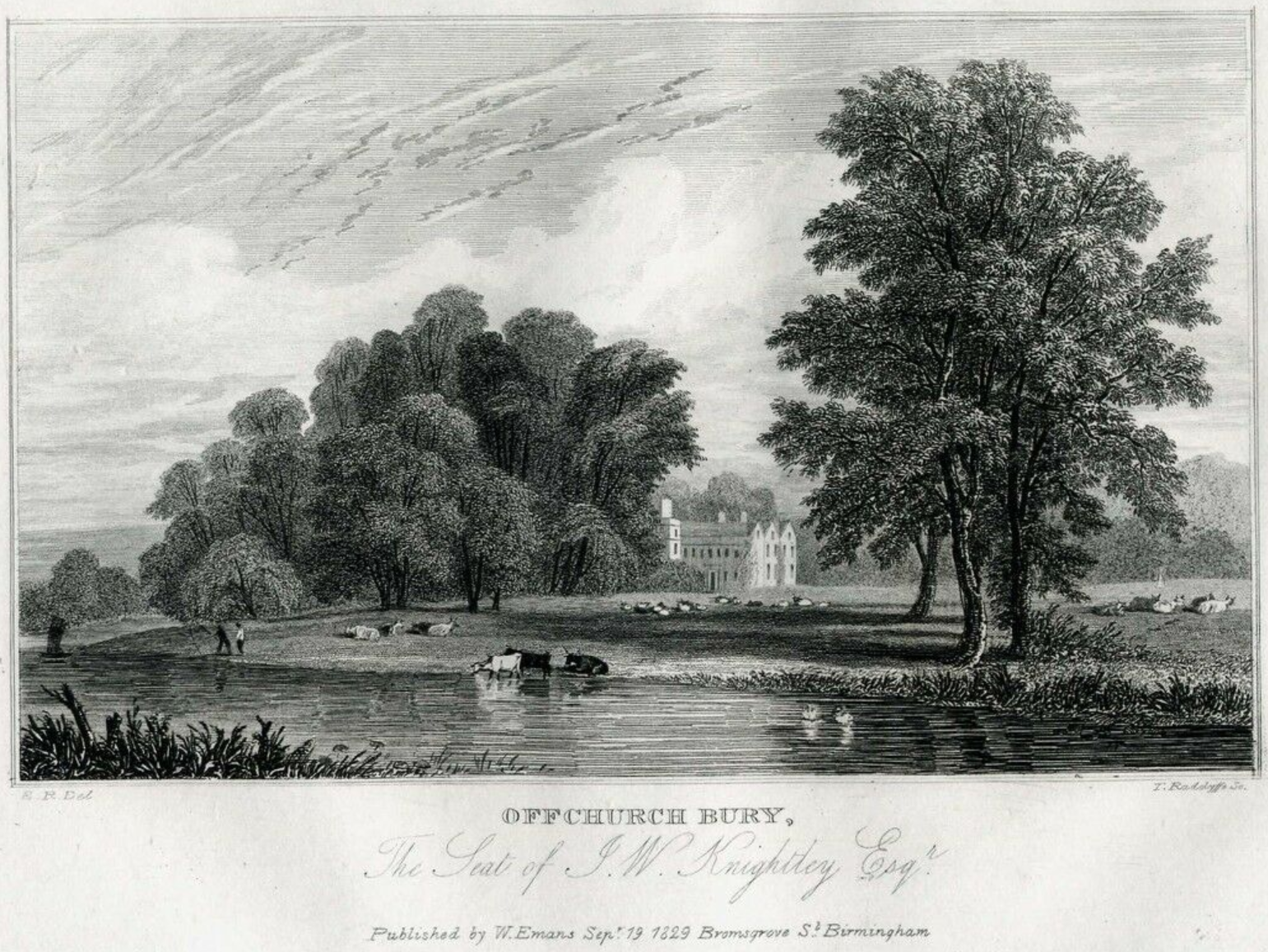
"Offchurch Bury, the seat of J.W. Knightley, Esq", 1829 engraving. View from south-east with River Leam in foreground, which flows on 2 miles westward to Leamington Spa and then into the River Avon at Warwick 2 miles further south-west

Offchurch Bury in 1904, view from east. In 1954 the two northernmost (right) 17th century gable end blocks were demolished, together with the entire 16th century south block (left) comprising the servants' quarters, and the corner tower (centre) linking the two main blocks was reduced in height to one storey

Offchurch Bury is a manor house one mile north-west of the centre of the village of Offchurch, Warwickshire, England. It is supposed to represent the site of a palace of the Anglo-Saxon King Offa of Mercia, after which Offchurch is named, "bury" being a corruption of "burh" meaning a fortified place. William Dugdale in his Antiquities of Warwickshire (1656) stated concerning the manor of Offchurch:

In one part of the lordship is a place called "the Berry" which signifies no less than "burgus" or "curia" and accordingly 'tis said that Offa King of Mercia in the Saxon Heptarchy had here a palace.

The Latin word burgus signifies "small fortified position or watch-tower usually controlling a main routeway", which suits the position of Offchurch, situated almost adjacent to the Fosse Way (now the B4455 Road), an important Roman road linking (on this stretch) the large Roman camps of Cirencester and Leicester.

Parts of the manor house (surviving pre-1954 demolition) dated from the reign of King Henry VIII and were said to be connected with Coventry Priory, but most is 19th century. In 1954 about three quarters of the house was demolished, including the entire Tudor south block comprising servants' quarters, and on the north side the 17th century dining room and morning room, to form the present smaller house, comprising the single south-facing entrance block with Strawberry Hill-Gothic style battlemented facade and Tudor-arched windows, containing the drawing room and inner hall. It is in private occupation and not open to the public, although the park is occasionally used for equestrian events. The tranquility of the estate has been marred in recent years by the encroachment of the suburbs of Leamington Spa.

== Descent ==
=== Coventry Priory ===
The manor is not listed in the Domesday Book of 1086. In the 13th century it was held by Coventry Priory in Warwickshire, situated 9 miles to the north; a confirmation of the original charter by King Henry III in 1267 implies that it was in possession of the Priory from its foundation in 1043. Following the Dissolution of the Monasteries, the manor was acquired in 1542 by Sir Edmund Knightley.

=== Knightley ===
Arms of Knightley: Quarterly ermine and paly of six or and gules

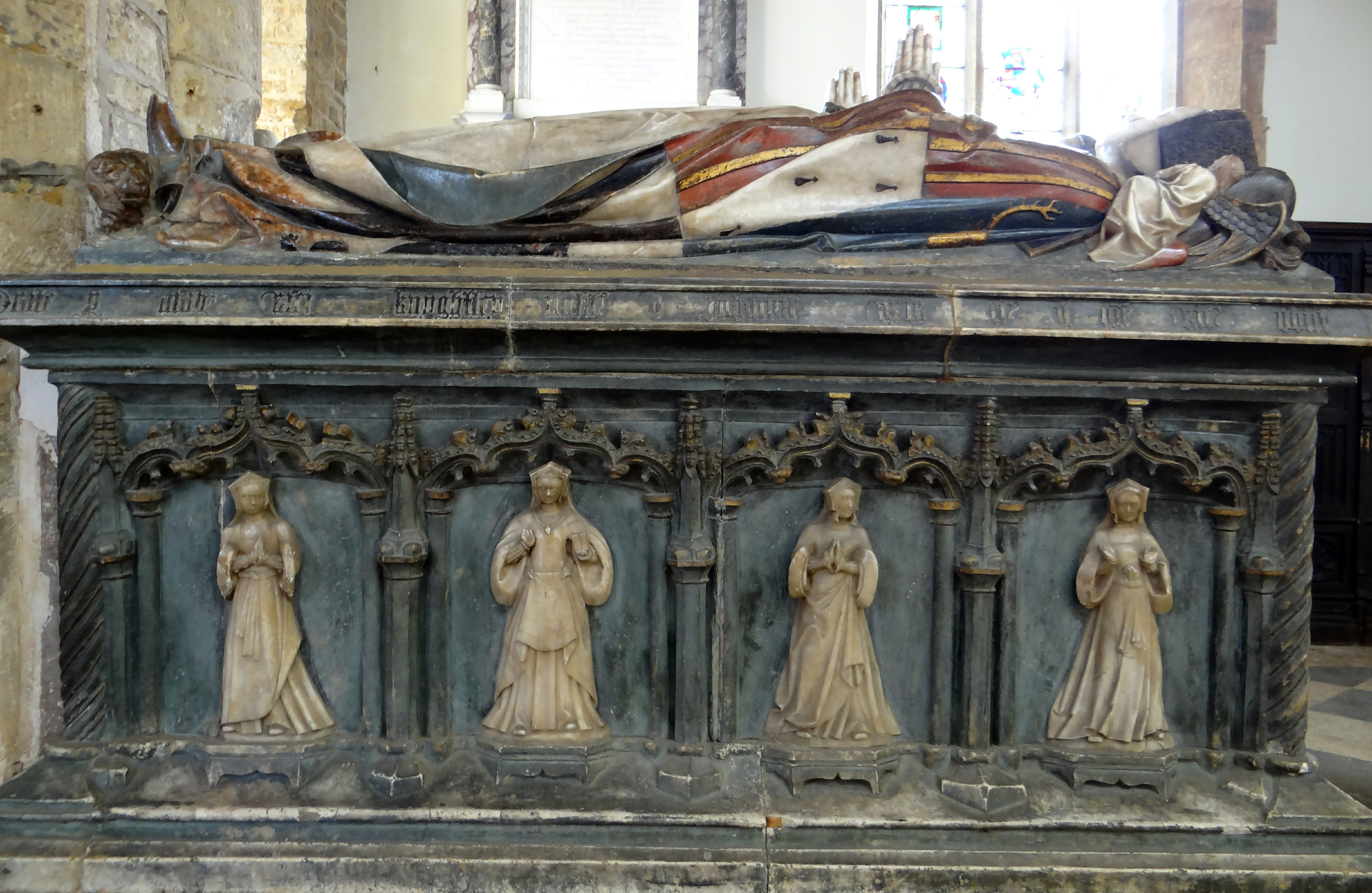
Chest tomb monument and effigies in Fawsley Church of Sir Richard Knightley (d.1534) and his wife Joan Skennard, parents of Sir Edmund Knightley (d.1542) who purchased Offchurch

Mark Noble (1787) wrote of the Knightley family:

There is no private family in the kingdom has given more knights; none which has been more numerous in its branches; some of them have almost rivalled the eldest in consequence, and that fettled in France surpassed them, having many centuries ago been declared noble; the alliances they have contracted have been equal to themselves, and the many high offices held by them in the state, have been exceeded only by the very large possessions they have constantly had.

The Knightley family originated at the Staffordshire manor of Knightley, acquired by them shortly after the Norman Conquest of 1066. In 1415 Sir Richard Knightley purchased the manor of Fawsley in Northamptonshire, where the senior line of the family became seated. Sir Edmund Knightley of Fawsley was the third son, and eventual heir, of Sir Richard Knightley of Fawsley, who held 41 manors in the central midlands, by his wife Joan Skennard, daughter and heiress of Henry Skennard (or Skynnerton) of Alderton, Northamptonshire. He was a sergeant-at-law trained in the Middle Temple who served as a Member of Parliament for Reading in 1515 and for Wilton in 1529. He married Ursula de Vere, a sister and coheiress of John de Vere, 14th Earl of Oxford. He acquired much land following the Dissolution of the Monasteries, including in 1538 Studley Priory in Warwickshire. In 1538 he became the heir of his elder brother Richard Knightley, of Fawsley and of Upton near Northampton, MP, who died without male issue, whose monument survives in St Michael's Church, Upton. Sir Edmund Knightley, like his elder brother, also died childless, leaving as his heir his younger brother Sir Valentine Knightley, of Fawsley, who in 1561–2 received a new grant of the manor. He bequeathed Offchurch to his fourth son Edward Knightley. The descent of Knightley of Offchurch was as follows:

- Edward Knightley (fl.1585/1604), fourth son of Sir Valentine Knightley, of Fawsley. The Offchurch branch of the family remained as Roman Catholics after the Reformation, which restricted their opportunities to serve in public life. Edward Knightley married three times, his second wife being Elizabeth Lenthall, a daughter of Sir William Lenthall of Latchford in Oxfordshire.
- Richard Knightley, son by father's second wife, married Anne Pettus, a daughter of Sir John Pettus. In 1626 the manor was seized by the crown and was leased for 21 years to John Pecke, but subsequently reverted to the Knightley family.;
- Sir John Knightley, 1st Baronet (c. 1611–c. 1670), son, who returned to royal favour on the Restoration of the Monarchy in 1660 when he was created a baronet "of Offchurch" by King Charles II. He married Bridget Lewknor, a daughter of Sir Lewes Lewknor (c.1560–1627) of Selsey, Sussex, Master of the Ceremonies to King James I and a Member of Parliament for Midhurst in 1597 and for Bridgnorth 1604.
- Sir John Knightley, 2nd Baronet (died 1689), son, a magistrate and Deputy-Lieutenant of Warwickshire, "in which shire he possessed great influence", who was the first Protestant in his family. He married but died without issue when the baronetcy expired. He had always promised faithfully to leave his property to his cousin Richard Knightley of Charwelton, but disregarding his promise, left it to his wife's grandson, by her first husband Thomas Wightwick. Sir John himself states in his will that he did this in consequence of the unkind behaviour of his Knightley male relations, who refused to go to him in his illness.

=== Wightwick (Knightley) ===
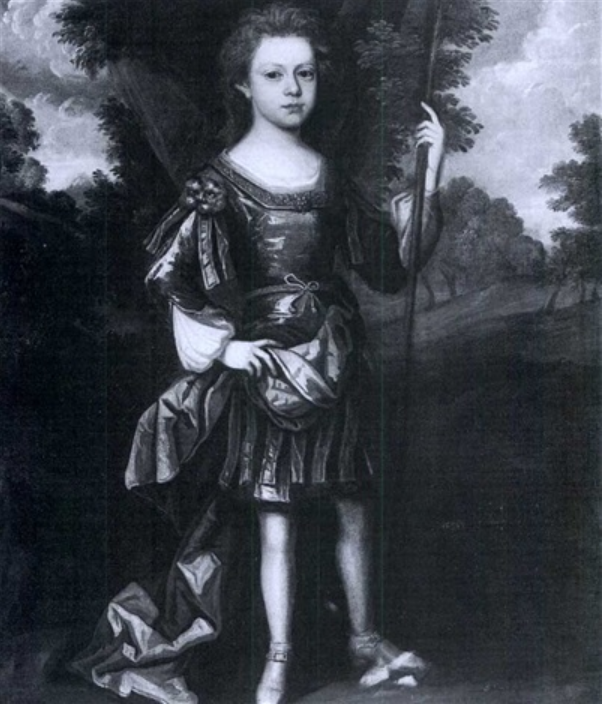
Master John Wightwick Knightley, portrait by Robert Byng (1666-1720). He inherited the estate aged 9 from his step-grandfather

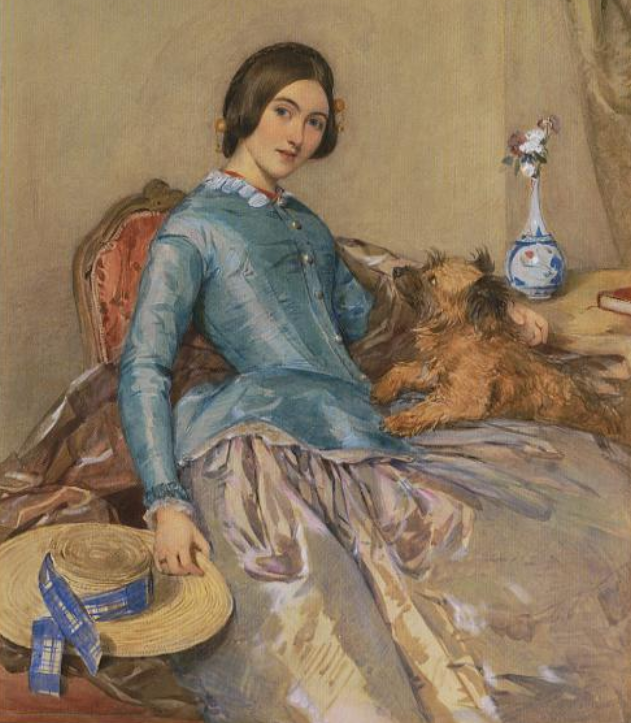
Jane Wightwick Knightley (1827-1911) (Countess of Aylesford), heiress of Offchurch Bury. She married Heneage Finch, 6th Earl of Aylesford (d.1871)

On his death in 1689 the 2nd Baronet bequeathed the manor to his 9-year-old step-grandson John Wightwick (his wife's grandson by her first husband), who in accordance with the terms of the bequest adopted the surname and arms of Knightley. The senior line of Knightley was still extant at Fawsley, but the 2nd Baronet quarrelled with his male relatives whom he excluded as his heirs. In 1699, at the age of 19, in Whitehall Chapel, Middlesex, with the consent of his aunt and guardian Mary Wastaney, John Wightwick Knightley I married 22 year-old Mary Marow, a daughter and co-heiress of Sir Samuel Marow, 1st Baronet of Berkswell Hall, Warwickshire.

His son and heir was Thomas Wightwick Knightley of Offchurch Bury, the father of John Wightwick Knightley of Offchurch Bury (husband of Jane Musgrave). The latter's son was John Wightwick Knightley who died aged 26 at Terracina in Italy, where he had gone for the sake of his health - or possibly to avoid his creditors. His mural monument survives in Offchurch Church. Having married Jane Willes, a daughter of Rev. William Willes of Astrop House in Northamptonshire, he left a daughter and sole heiress Jane Wightwick Knightley who married Heneage Finch, 6th Earl of Aylesford.

=== Finch ===
Arms of Finch, Earl of Aylesford: Argent, a chevron between three griffins passant sable

Jane Wightwick Knightley (Countess of Aylesford), heiress of Offchurch, married Heneage Finch, 6th Earl of Aylesford. of Packington Hall in Warwickshire. The Countess of Aylesford died in 1911 and bequeathed Offchurch to her younger grandson Captain the Hon. Charles Daniel Finch, second son of Charles Wightwick Finch, 8th Earl of Aylesford. In 1912 in accordance with the bequest he changed his surname to Finch-Knightley. On the death of his nephew the 9th Earl in 1940 (killed in action), he would inherit the earldom, and become Charles Daniel Finch-Knightley, 10th Earl of Aylesford. In 1917 Charles Daniel Finch-Knightley sold the Offchurch Bury estate, with 2,610 acres including "the beautiful old Henry the Eighth mansion standing in the park of about 230 acres, 14 capital farms and residential properties".

=== Watson ===
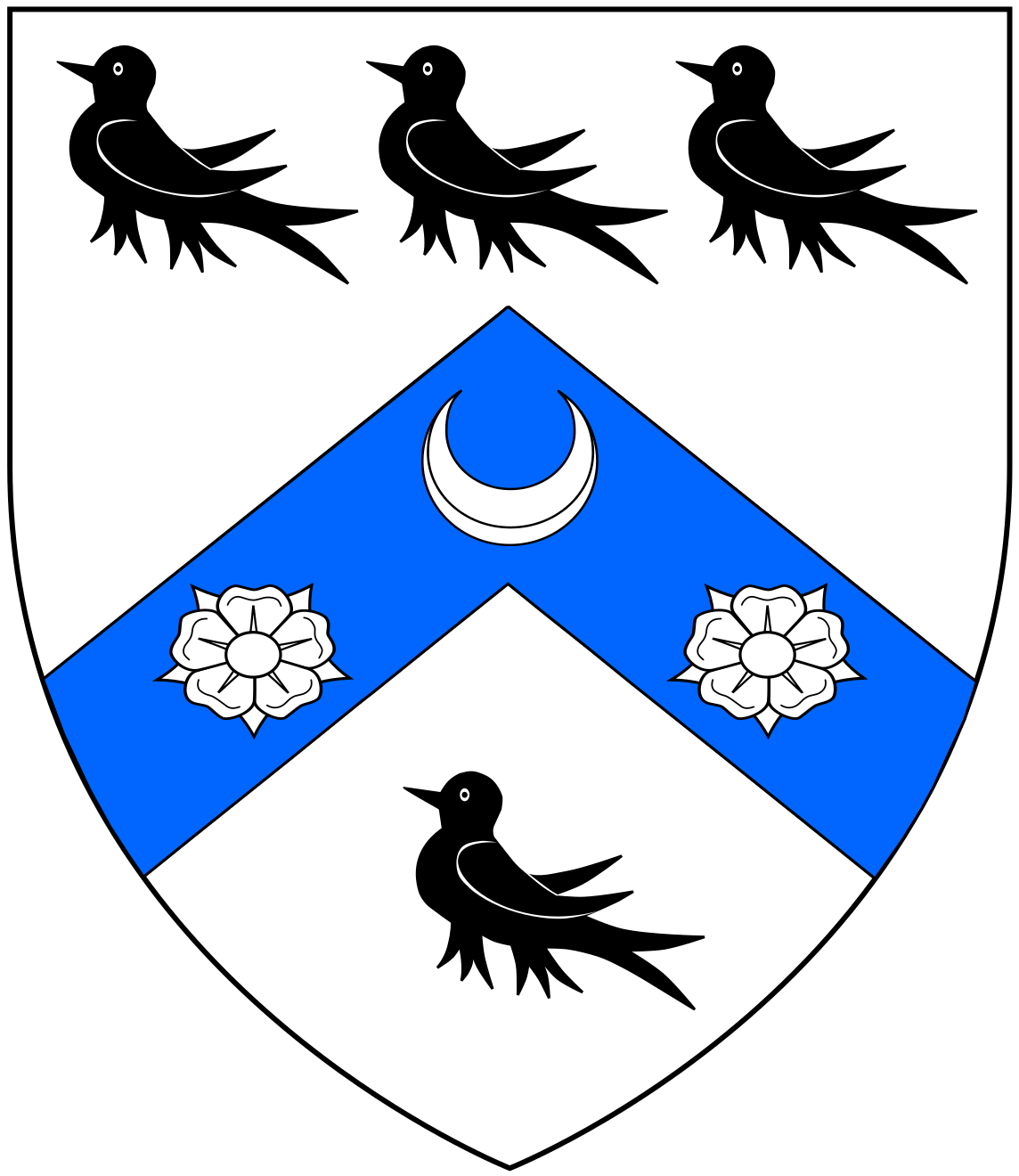
Arms of Watson, Baron Manton: Argent, on a chevron azure between four martlets three in-chief and one in-base sable a crescent between two roses of the field

The buyer (via his company the Olympia Agricultural and Pure Stock Farms Ltd, based at Selby in Yorkshire), was Mr Joseph Watson, of Linton Spring, near Wetherby, Yorkshire, a soap manufacturer from Leeds, who also in 1921 purchased as his residence the nearby estate of Compton Verney in Warwickshire and in 1922 was created Baron Manton "of Compton Verney". Watson used the estate of Offchurch (with others at Barlby in Yorkshire, Thorney in Cambridgeshire and Sudbourne in Suffolk) for his venture into industrialised agriculture. He died unexpectedly in 1922 of a heart attack whilst hunting with the Warwickshire Foxhounds near Compton Verney and was buried at Offchurch. His son and heir Miles Watson, 2nd Baron Manton, resided for a while at Compton Verney, which he sold in 1929, whilst Joseph's widow Claire, Baroness Manton, lived at Offchurch Bury until her death in 1936, the surrounding estate having been sold in 1923.

=== Johnson ===
The manor of Offchurch Bury was purchased in 1923, with the reversion of the house, by Henry ("Harry") Johnson, a textile manufacturer and managing director of Courtaulds Ltd at Coventry in Warwickshire, the son of a silk throwster at Macclesfield. He was "one of the builders and guiding figures of the great Courtauld organization". Following his death it became the seat of his son Henry Leslie Johnson, educated at Rugby, also a director of Courtaulds, and his wife Mabel Caroline (Carol) (née Hawkins). Between 1954 and 1958 it was necessary to demolish about three quarters of the house, including the entire Tudor south block comprising servants' quarters, and on the north side the 17th century dining room and morning room, to leave the present smaller house. Henry and Carol founded a successful horse training and racing business in 1951 before moving into horse breeding with the Offchurch Bury Stud. Following Henry's death in 1991 the house and 1,000 acre estate was owned jointly by the purchaser's grandson Henry Edward ("Harry") Johnson, with his mother Carol. Harry Johnson served as chairman of the Warwickshire Branch of the National Farmers Union (2010–11) and chairman of the West Midlands Regional Board of the NFU (2010–14). Harry with his former wife Diana founded the Offchurch Bury Polo Club after having visited the notable polo coach Col. Raghvir Singh at Dundlod in India, and founded the Offchurch Bury Horse Trials. The estate remains today in the ownership of Harry Johnson, whose twin daughters Emily and Tessa run the polo stud and polo club respectively. The estate has hosted horse trials at all levels (including the British Riding Clubs National Championships 1999–2009), the Pony Club Tetrathlon Championships, film and TV location work, The Wolf Run, and the Young Farmers Festival amongst other diverse events.
