= St George Hanover Square =

Former civil parish in London, England

Coordinates: 51°30′45″N 0°8′35″W

- Civil parish
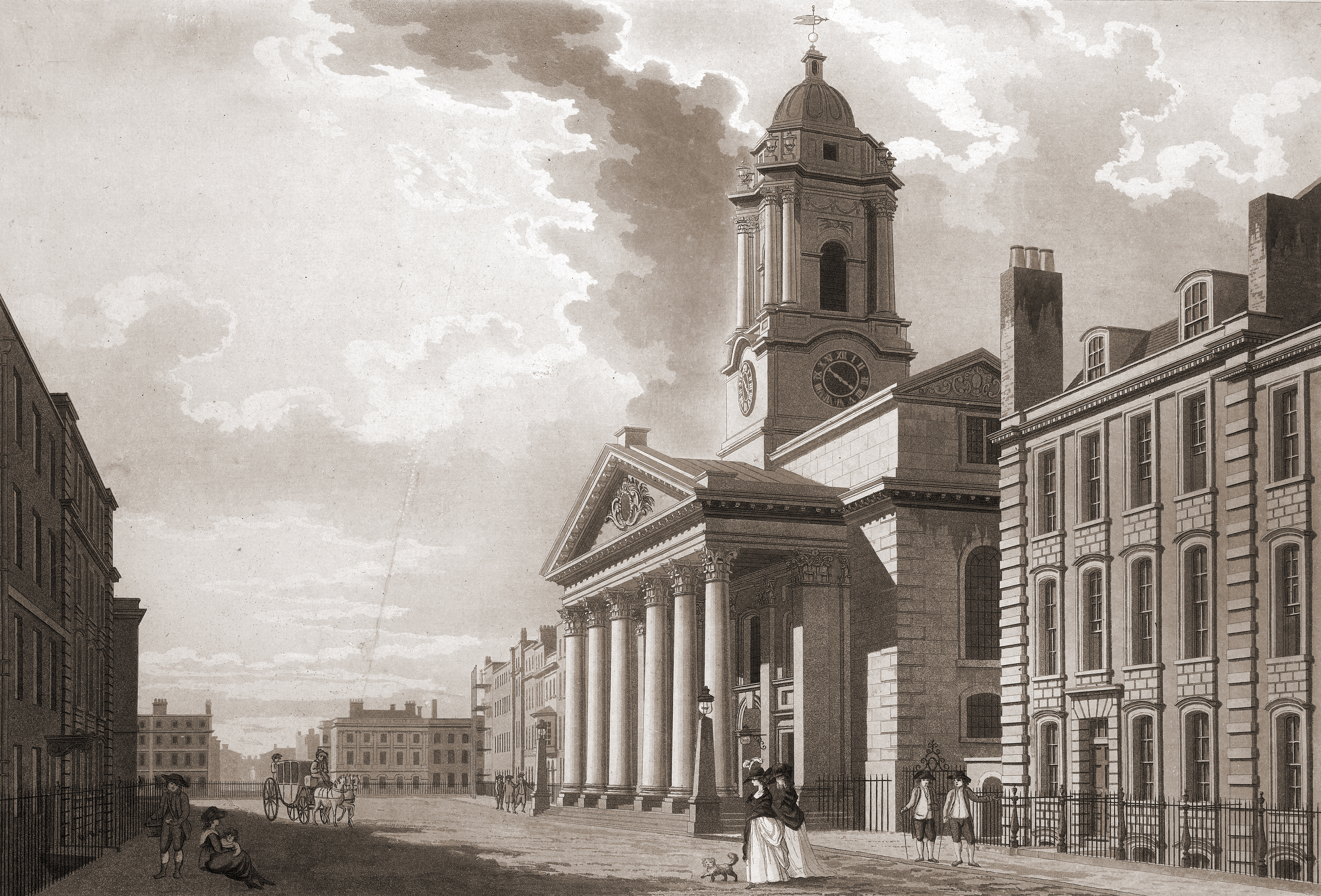
- The building of the Church of St George's, Hanover Square, prompted the creation of a new parish and select vestry for church and civil purposes

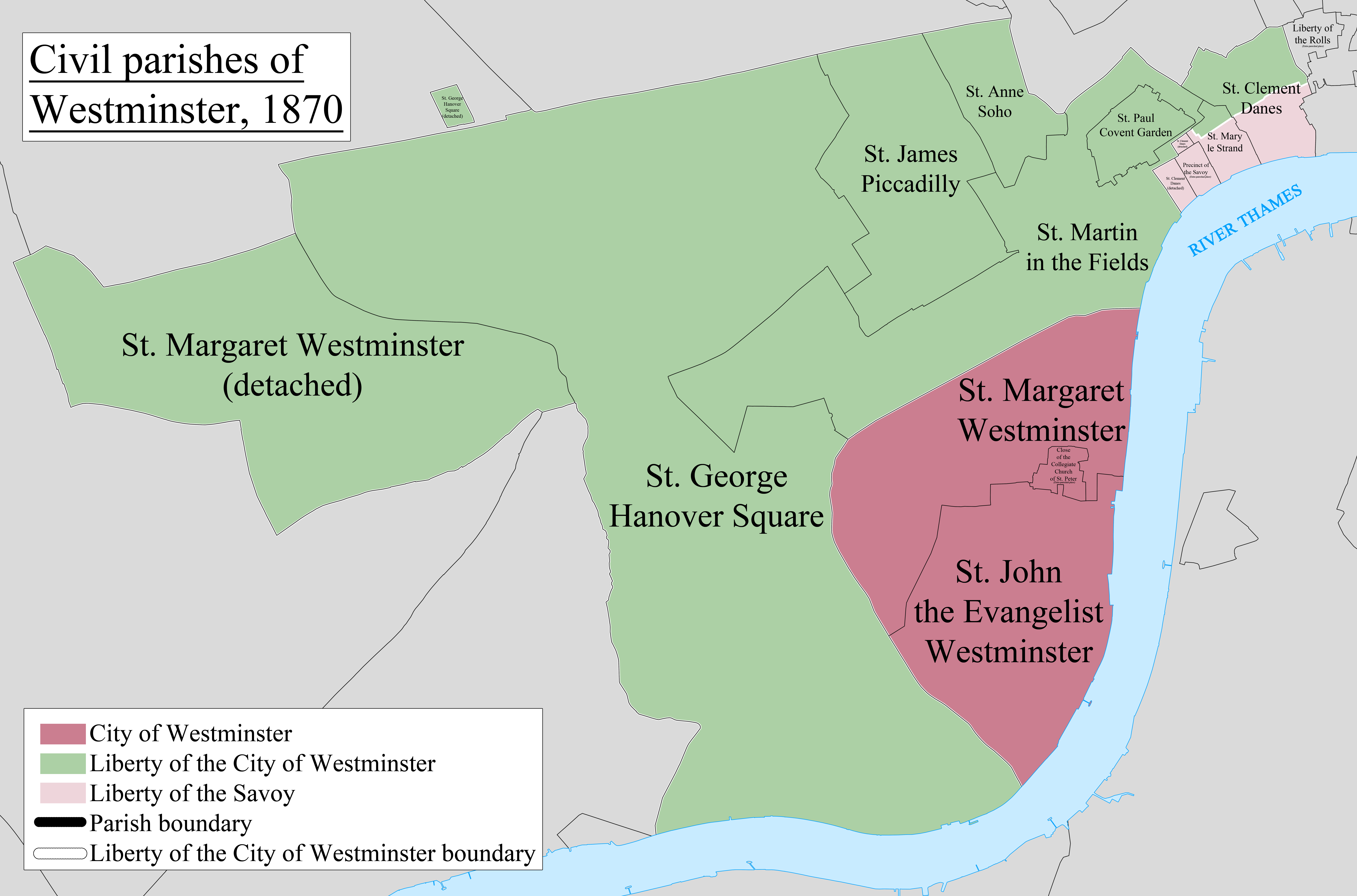
- Area
  - 1851: 1,161 acres (4.70 km^{2})
  - 1901: 1,111 acres (4.50 km^{2})
  - 1921: 1,110 acres (4.5 km^{2})
- Population
  - 1851: 73,230
  - 1901: 76,957
  - 1921: 67,280
- Density
  - 1851: 63.1/acre
  - 1901: 69.3/acre
  - 1921: 60.6/acre
- History
  - Preceded by: St Martin in the Fields
  - Origin: Commission for Building Fifty New Churches
  - Created: 1724
  - Abolished: 1922
  - Succeeded by: City of Westminster (parish)
- Status: Civil parish (1724–1922); Poor law parish (1834–1870)
- Government: St George Hanover Square Vestry (1724–1900)
  - Type: Vestry
  - HQ: Vestry Hall, Mount Street, Mayfair
- Contained within
  - Poor Law Union: St George's (1870–1913); City of Westminster (1913–1922)

St George Hanover Square was a civil parish in the metropolitan area of London, England. The creation of the parish accompanied the building of the Church of St George's, Hanover Square, constructed by the Commission for Building Fifty New Churches to meet the demands of the growing population. The parish was formed in 1724 from part of the ancient parish of St Martin in the Fields in the Liberty of Westminster and county of Middlesex. It included some of the most fashionable areas of the West End, including Belgravia and Mayfair. Civil parish administration, known as a select vestry, was dominated by members of the British nobility until the parish adopted the Vestries Act 1831. The vestry was reformed again in 1855 by the Metropolis Management Act. In 1889 the parish became part of the County of London and the vestry was abolished in 1900, replaced by Westminster City Council. The civil parish continued to have a nominal existence until 1922, but it continued to exist as a registration district until 1933. At the 1921 census (the last before the abolition of the parish), St George Hanover Square had a population of 67,280.

As created, it was a parish for both church and civil purposes, but the boundaries of the ecclesiastical parish were adjusted in 1830, 1835 and 1865.

== Creation ==
The New Churches in London and Westminster Act 1710 created the Commission for Building Fifty New Churches with the purpose of building new churches to deal with the increasing population. The commission also chose the boundaries of the new parishes and selected suitable persons to be parish officers and vestrymen. Within the parish were some of the most fashionable areas of the West End of London, with an aristocratic population. The select vestry created by the commission included 100 men. Much of the population of the parish was resident for only part of the year. The parish was created in 1724 from part of the ancient parish of St Martin in the Fields. It was within the Liberty of Westminster and the county of Middlesex. The parish vestry therefore had overlapping jurisdiction with the Westminster Court of Burgesses and the Westminster and Middlesex sessions.

== Geography ==
The northern boundary was Bayswater Road and Oxford Street from Lancaster Gate, past Marble Arch, to Oxford Circus. The western boundary was the River Westbourne. The southern boundary was the River Thames. The parish included the part of Hyde Park northeast of the Serpentine and the Mayfair area. To the south it narrowed, including the Belgravia area, Knightsbridge, Victoria Station and Pimlico. Hanover Square was located near to the northeastern boundary. It included within its boundaries the grounds of Buckingham Palace, although the palace itself was in St Martin in the Fields.

== Reform ==
The parish adopted the Vestries Act 1831, which provided for election of vestrymen by all ratepayers. The aristocratic dominance of the vestry declined. In 1815, 40% of vestrymen had titles and in 1845 it was half that.

In 1855, the parish vestry became a local authority within the area of responsibility of the Metropolitan Board of Works.

Under the Metropolis Management Act 1855 any parish that exceeded 2,000 ratepayers was to be divided into wards; however the parish of St George Hanover Square had already been divided into seven wards by a local act, the St. George Hanover Square Improvement Act 1826 (7 Geo. 4. c. cxxi), "An Act for better paving, lighting, regulating and improving the parish of Saint George Hanover-square within the liberty of the city of Westminster". So the incorporated vestry inherited these wards and assigned vestrymen to them: Dover (6), Conduit (9), Grosvenor (12), Brook (15), Curzon (12), Knightsbridge (27) and The Out (27).

== Ecclesiastical division ==
It was initially a parish for both ecclesiastical and civil purposes. However, by 1865 it was divided into eleven ecclesiastical districts.

== Poor law ==
St George was a local act parish and so it did not become part of the New Poor Law system, following the Poor Law Amendment Act 1834. This meant it did not form part of a union and the parish vestry remained in control of poor law functions, instead of a separately elected board of guardians as was typical. Following the Metropolitan Poor Act 1867 (30 & 31 Vict. c. 6), it was joined with St Margaret and St John for this purpose in 1870 as the St George's Union and a board of guardians elected.

== Abolition ==
In 1889 the parish became part of the County of London. The vestry was abolished in 1900 and replaced by Westminster City Council, when it became part of the Metropolitan Borough of Westminster. It was abolished as a civil parish on 1 April 1922 to form City of Westminster but continued to exist as a registration district until 1 October 1933.

== Population ==
Year	1801	1811	1821	1831	1841	1851	1871	1881	1891	1901	1911	1921
Population	38,440	41,687	46,384	58,209	66,552	73,230	90,028	89,573	78,364	76,957	70,106	67,280

== Notable people ==
- Heneage Finch, 7th Earl of Aylesford (1849–1885), aristocrat
- Lady Amabel Kerr (1846-1906), writer
- William Horatio Walsh (1812-1882), Anglican priest (christened & married here)
