= Malcolm Donald Murray =

British Army officer and courtier (1867–1938)

Sir Malcolm Donald Murray GCVO CB CIE
- Born: July 9, 1867
- Died: August 2, 1938 (aged 71); Virginia Water Lake, Windsor Great Park, Surrey, England
- Cause of death: Drowning
- Spouse: Lady Hilda Joanna Gwendolen Finch (m. 1898; d. 1931)
- Children: Iain Arthur Murray
- Military career
- Allegiance: United Kingdom
- Branch: British Army
- Service years: 1888–post 1914
- Rank: Lieutenant Colonel
- Unit: Seaforth Highlanders
- Known for: British Army officer and courtier to the Duke of Connaught and Strathearn.
- Conflicts: Second Boer War
- Awards: GCVO; CB; CIE; Foreign decorations

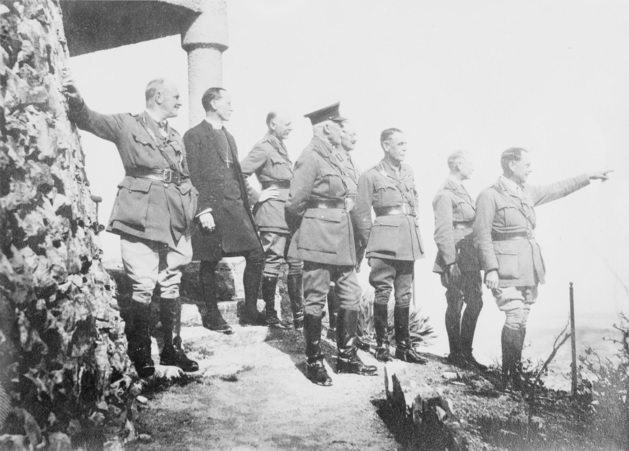
From left to right are, Sir Edmund Allenby, Rennie MacInnes, Malcolm Donald Murray, HRH the Duke of Connaught, Major General J S M Shea, Sir E S Bulfin, General Sir Harry Chauvel, Sir Philip Chetwode (March 19, 1918).

Lieutenant Colonel Sir Malcolm Donald Murray GCVO CB CIE (9 July 1867 – 2 August 1938) was a British Army officer and courtier.

== Background ==
Murray was the younger son of Brigadier-General Alexander Henry Murray (1829-1885) by his wife Martha Frances Vincent Davenport (d. 1911). His father was a patrilineal grandson of the 4th Earl of Dunmore, who was descended from a younger son of the first Marquess of Atholl, of the Clan Murray.

== Military career ==
Murray was commissioned a second lieutenant in the Seaforth Highlanders on 29 February 1888. He was promoted to lieutenant on 4 September 1889, and to captain on 1 February 1895.

At the outbreak of the Second Boer War in 1899, Murray was sent with his battalion to South Africa, where he fought in the Transvaal. After his return to the United Kingdom, he was in February 1902 seconded for service on the staff, and appointed aide-de-camp to Major-General Ronald Lane, Commanding the Infantry Brigade at Malta. The following year, Murray, promoted to major in October 1903, was appointed aide-de-camp to Field Marshal the Duke of Connaught, and served as such during the latter's remaining years as Commander-in-Chief Ireland (until 1904), and from 1904-06 when he was Inspector-General to the Forces.

He rejoined his regiment on the outbreak of the First World War in August 1914, and retired as lieutenant colonel after serving on the staff.

== Courtier ==
Murray was Extra Equerry to Prince Arthur, Duke of Connaught and Strathearn from 1903 to 1907, when he was appointed Equerry and Comptroller of the Household to His Royal Highness. He served as Deputy Ranger of Windsor Great Park from 1929 to 1937.

== Honours ==
Murray was appointed a Member (4th class) of the Royal Victorian Order (MVO) in 1905, promoted to a Commander (CVO) of the order in the 1909 Birthday Honours list, knighted as a Knight Commander (KCVO) of the order in 1916, and promoted to Knight Grand Cross (GCVO) in the 1936 Birthday Honours list. He was appointed a Companion of the Order of the Bath (CB) in the 1911 Coronation Honours, and later appointed a Companion of the Order of the Indian Empire (CIE).

He also received numerous foreign decorations.

== Death ==
Murray died aged 71 on 2 August 1938 from drowning after falling off of a capsized boat in Virginia Water Lake in the Windsor Great Park, Borough of Runnymede in the county of Surrey. He hit his neck on the way down, incapacitating him and rendering him unable to swim. One individual, Alexander Ure, tried unsuccessfully to save him.

== Family ==
Murray married, in 1898, Lady Hilda Joanna Gwendolen Finch (1872-1931), daughter of Heneage Finch, 7th Earl of Aylesford and Edith Finch, Countess of Aylesford. They had one son, Lieutenant-Colonel Iain Arthur Murray (1904-1986).
