= Offchurch =

Coordinates: 52.290°N 1.475°W

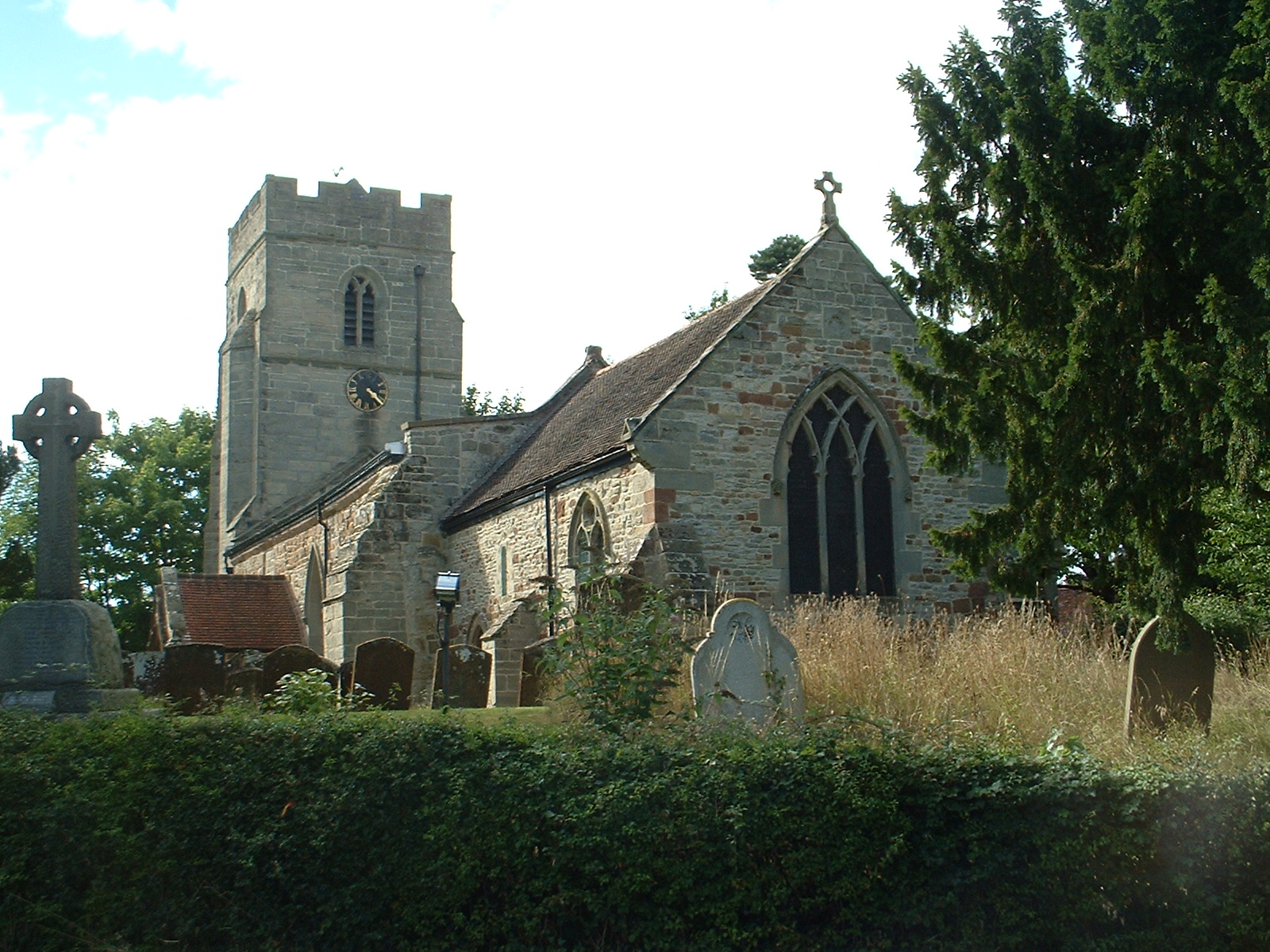
- Parish church of St. Gregory

- Location within Warwickshire
- Population: 250 (2011 census)
- OS grid reference: SP3565
- Civil parish: Offchurch
- District: Warwick
- Shire county: Warwickshire
- Region: West Midlands
- Country: England
- Sovereign state: United Kingdom
- Post town: Leamington Spa
- Postcode district: CV33
- Dialling code: 01926
- Police: Warwickshire
- Fire: Warwickshire
- Ambulance: West Midlands
- UK Parliament: Warwick and Leamington
- Website: Warwickshire Communities: Offchurch

Offchurch is a village and civil parish on the River Leam, 3 miles (4.8 km) east of Leamington Spa in Warwickshire. The population of the civil parish at the 2011 census was 250.

== History ==
The origin of the name "Offa's Church" suggests a connection to Offa, who was King of Mercia from 757 to 796, and the proximity to the manor house of Offchurch Bury lead William Dugdale to infer there was a fortification of Offa's here deriving from the Saxon word burh or fortified place. William Camden went further and quoted the legend that Offa's son, Fremund, 'a man of great renown', had been murdered and "buried at his Father's Palace, now called Offchurch", the church being built to commemorate his death. The village is not mentioned by name in Leofric's foundation charter of Coventry Priory in 1043 or in the Domesday Book of 1086, but the wording of the confirmation of the charter by Henry III in 1267 implies that the place was in possession of this priory from its foundation. At the time of the Dissolution of the Monasteries by Henry VIII, the estate was purchased by the Knightley family who possessed it until the First World War.

The estate was then purchased together with other estates by Joseph Watson, a soap manufacturer from Leeds, created 1st Baron Manton in 1922. He died in March of the same year, aged only 49, from a heart-attack, whilst out hunting beside two of his sons with the Warwickshire Foxhounds, at Upper Quinton, close to his new mansion. He had held his title for less than two months and was buried at Offchurch, in his hunting apparel. At this time some development took place in the building of a series of cottages for estate workers during the 1920s (New Cottages, Bridge Cottages, Ford Cottages, Ham Barn Cottages, etc.) to similar designs. After the death of Baron Manton his widow resided at Offchurch Bury manor house, 1 mile (1.6 km) northwest of the village, until her death in 1936. The manor was then purchased by Harry Johnson, a textile manufacturer from Coventry and Macclesfield, whose descendants today retain much of the estate in 2011 and live at Offchurch Bury.

== Notable buildings ==
The parish church of St. Gregory stands on the crest of the hill above the village. It consists of chancel with north vestry, nave with south porch, and west tower, and is built of the local red sandstone. There is no trace of Offa's church, but the church, rebuilt from 12th century onwards, on the supposed site of Offa's church contains Norman elements. and traces of an Anglo-Saxon cemetery were found about 1875 south of the church close to the road to Long Itchington. A stone coffin is on display in the current church, but there is no direct evidence that this dates from Saxon times. A local legend says that if you go to the top of the church and jump off, King Offa will rise from the ground and catch you.

== Transport links ==
Offchurch lies just off the Fosse Way, a Roman Road, and the Welsh Road, an important medieval drovers' road also passes through the village.

== Amenities ==
The local amenities include the Church of England parish church of St. Gregory, a redeveloped village hall (part of the former village school) and the Stag's Head public house, now renamed "The Stag at Offchurch". The trackbed of the former Leamington to Rugby line, the Grand Union Canal and a network of footpaths make Offchurch a focus for walks in this part of rural Warwickshire.

== Sources ==
- Pevsner, Nikolaus; Wedgwood, Alexandra (1966). The Buildings of England: Warwickshire. Harmondsworth: Penguin Books. pp. 367–368.
- Salzman, L.F., ed. (1951). Victoria County History: A History of the County of Warwick, Volume 6: Knightlow Hundred. pp. 194–198.
