= Earl of Aylesford =

Earldom in the Peerage of Great Britain

Earldom of Aylesford
- Arms of Finch, Earls of Aylesford: Argent, a chevron between three griffins passant sable
- Creation date: 1714
- Created by: George I
- Peerage: Peerage of Great Britain
- First holder: Heneage Finch, 1st Earl of Aylesford
- Present holder: Charles Finch-Knightley, 12th Earl of Aylesford
- Heir apparent: James Daniel Finch-Knightley, Lord Guernsey
- Remainder to: heirs male
- Subsidiary titles: Baron Guernsey
- Seat: Packington Hall
- Motto: Aperto vivere voto ("To live in open faith")

Earl of Aylesford, in the County of Kent, is a title in the Peerage of Great Britain. The junior branch of the Earl of Winchilsea and Nottingham. It was created in 1714 for the lawyer and politician Heneage Finch, 1st Baron Guernsey. He had already been created Baron Guernsey in the Peerage of England in 1703.

Finch was the younger son of Heneage Finch, 1st Earl of Nottingham and the great-grandson of Elizabeth Heneage, 1st Countess of Winchilsea. Lord Aylesford's eldest son, the second Earl, represented Maidstone and Surrey in Parliament. In 1712, he married Mary Fisher, daughter of Sir Clement Fisher, 3rd Baronet. Through this marriage Packington Hall in Warwickshire came into the Finch family.

Their son, the third Earl, sat as a Member of Parliament for Leicestershire and Maidstone. His eldest son, the fourth Earl, represented Castle Rising and Maidstone in the House of Commons, and after entering the House of Lords on his father's death, served as Captain of the Yeomen of the Guard from 1783 to 1804 and as Lord Steward of the Household from 1804 to 1812.

His second but eldest surviving son, the fifth Earl, was a Tory Member of Parliament for Weobly. His son, the sixth Earl, represented South Warwickshire in Parliament as a Conservative. His grandson, the tenth Earl, assumed by Royal licence his grandmother's maiden surname of Knightley in addition to that of Finch. His son, the eleventh Earl, served as Lord Lieutenant of the West Midlands. As of 2015, the titles are held by the latter's son, who succeeded in 2008.

The Hon. Charles Finch, younger son of the third Earl, was Member of Parliament for Maidstone. His son Charles Griffith-Wynne (who assumed the surname of Griffith-Wynne in lieu of his patronymic), was Member of Parliament for Caernarvonshire. His son Charles Wynne sat as Member of Parliament for Caernarvon.

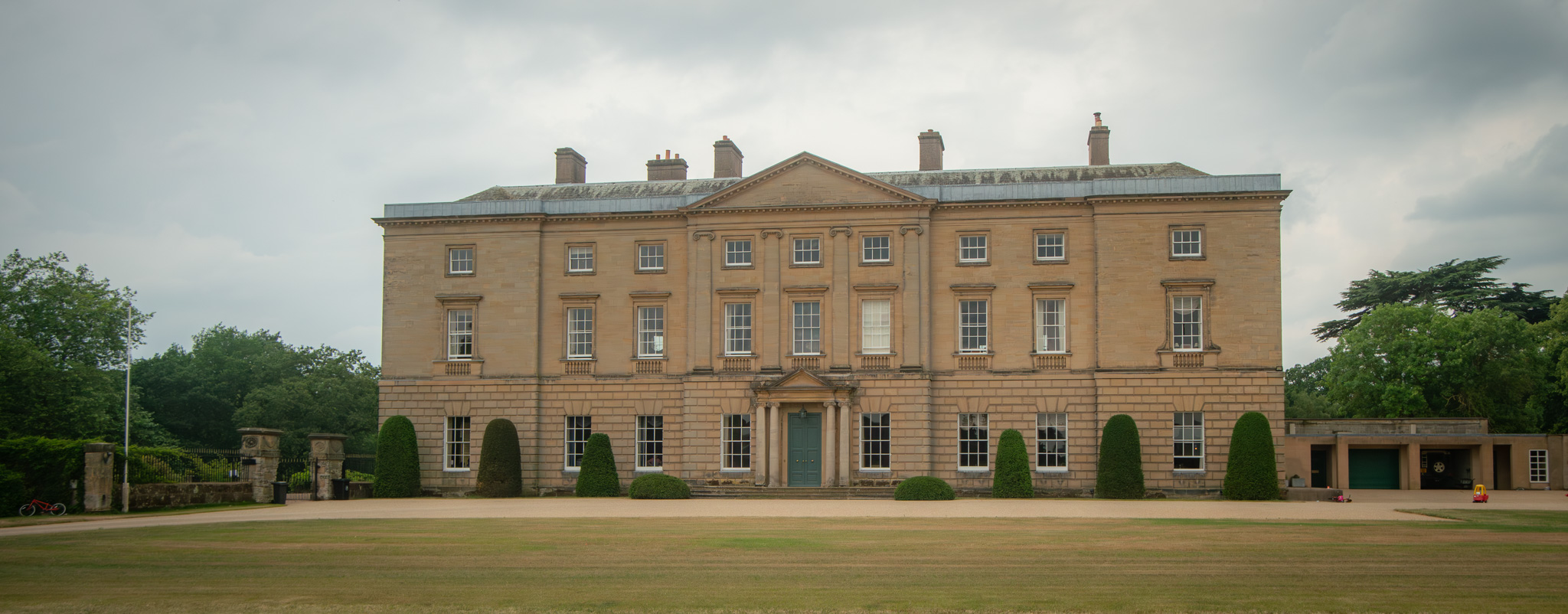
Packington Hall near Meriden, Warwickshire.

The family seat is Packington Hall, in Great Packington, near Meriden, Warwickshire.

== Earls of Aylesford (1714) ==
- Heneage Finch, 1st Earl of Aylesford (1649–1719)
- Heneage Finch, 2nd Earl of Aylesford (1683–1757)
- Heneage Finch, 3rd Earl of Aylesford (1715–1777) married his 2nd cousin, Lady Charlotte Seymour (1730-1805), daughter of Charles, 6th Duke of Somerset and Lady Charlotte Finch, daughter of Daniel Finch, 2nd Earl of Nottingham, 7th Earl of Winchilsea.
- Heneage Finch, 4th Earl of Aylesford (1751–1812) married Louisa Thynne, daughter of Thomas Thynne, 1st Marquess of Bath, and his wife, the former Lady Elizabeth Bentinck.
- Heneage Finch, 5th Earl of Aylesford (1786–1859), married Augusta Sophia Greville, daughter of George Greville, 2nd Earl of Warwick and Henrietta Vernon.
- Heneage Finch, 6th Earl of Aylesford (1824–1871), married Jane Wightwick Knightley daughter and heiress of John Wightwick Knightley of Offchurch Bury and Jane Willis.
- Heneage Finch, 7th Earl of Aylesford (1849–1885), son. He married 1871 Edith Peers-Williams (d. 1897), a daughter of Lt.-Col. Thomas Peers Williams, MP for Great Marlow 1820–1868 and Father of the House of Commons December 1867 – 1868, of Craig-y-Don near Beaumaris on Anglesey and Temple House, near Marlow. They had issue, two daughters. The Earl was separated from his wife in 1877, after which she bore an illegitimate son, later known as Guy Bertrand (b.1881) whose father was George Spencer-Churchill, Marquess of Blandford, later 8th Duke of Marlborough. This son, baptized not until 1883 as a son of the 7th Earl, claimed the earldom (the claim was made presumably by his mother or maternal relatives), but was refused by the House of Lords in July 1885. The 7th Earl was succeeded in 1885 by his brother. He owned 19,500 acres.
- Charles Wightwick Finch, 8th Earl of Aylesford (1851–1924), brother. He married, firstly 1873, Hon. Georgiana Agnes Bagot, daughter of William Bagot, 3rd Baron Bagot. He married, secondly 16 April 1879 Marcella Araminta Victoria Linton, née Ross (d. 1930), daughter of John Ross and widow of Captain John Wingfield Linton (by whom issue, one daughter Lady Brinckman); they had issue three sons and two daughters. He was succeeded by his grandson, only child of his eldest son Heneage Greville Finch, Lord Guernsey (1883–1914) killed in action in WW I.
- Heneage Michael Charles Finch, 9th Earl of Aylesford (31 October 1908 – 28 May 1940), grandson of 8th Earl, killed in action in WW II. He married 18 April 1940 (as her second husband) Pamela Elizabeth Coventry (16 October 1901 – 4 May 1990), elder daughter of the cricketer Colonel Hon. Charles John Coventry (1867–1929) (second son of George Coventry, 9th Earl of Coventry) and former wife of James George Greville Dugdale (1898–1964) of Wroxall Abbey, Warwick, Warwickshire, but had no issue by her (one stepdaughter). The earldom passed upon his death to his uncle.
- Charles Daniel Finch-Knightley, 10th Earl of Aylesford (23 August 1886 – 20 March 1958), uncle. He married Aileen Boyle (d. 30 August 1977), daughter of William McCormac Boyle, in 1918 and had issue two sons.
- Charles Ian Finch-Knightley, 11th Earl of Aylesford (1918–2008), son.
- Charles Finch-Knightley, 12th Earl of Aylesford (born 1947)

== Present peer ==
Heneage Charles Finch-Knightley, 12th Earl of Aylesford (born 27 March 1947) is the son of the 11th Earl and his wife Margaret Rosemary Tyer. Styled as Lord Guernsey from 1958, he was educated at Oundle School and Trinity College, Cambridge. He is also now known as Charles Aylesford.

In 1986, he was appointed a Deputy Lieutenant of the West Midlands and in 1990 was promoted to Vice-Lord-Lieutenant of the West Midlands, from which post he retired in 2015.

On 19 February 2008 he succeeded his father as Earl of Aylesford and Baron Guernsey.

In 1971 Lord Guernsey, as he then was, married Penelope Anstice Crawley, daughter of Kenneth Arnold Gibbs Crawley and a niece of Aidan Crawley, and they had four daughters and one son:

- Lady Rachel Louise Finch-Knightley (born 1974)
- Lady Kate Pamela Finch-Knightley (born 1974)
- Lady Alexandra Rosemary Finch-Knightley (born 1977). She married in 2008 James Dewar-Durie (son of Andrew Dewar-Durie of Durie and Countess Marguerite Kottulinsky von Kottulin und Dobrzenicz)
- Lady Laura Charlotte Finch-Knightley (born 1982)
- Heneage James Daniel Finch-Knightley, Lord Guernsey (born 1985), heir apparent. He married in 2012 Georgina Harker and has a son, Hon. Alfred Charles Heneage Finch-Knightley (born 2014).

In 1997 Lord Guernsey and his family were living at Packington Hall, Great Packington.
