= Great Packington =

Hamlet in Warwickshire, England

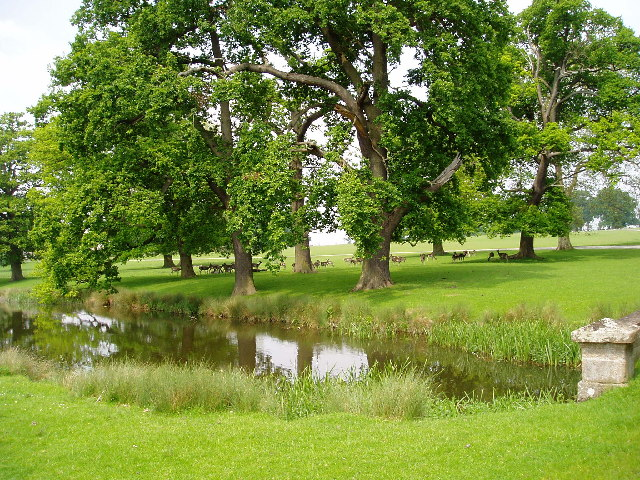
Packington Park

Great Packington, historically known as Packington Magna, is a hamlet, civil parish and country park in the North Warwickshire district of Warwickshire, England. The parish of Meriden is to the south-east, and Little Packington to the west. At Great Packington is Packington estate, which includes Packington Hall, Packington Old Hall and the Greek revival style St James' Church. In the 2021 census, the parish had a population of 176.

== History ==
=== Medieval ===
At the publication of the Domesday Book in 1086, (Great) Packington and Little Packington were recorded as Patitone, where the first t is a mistake for c, i.e. Pacitone. The settlement of 15 households was then within the hundred of Coleshill in Warwickshire. The tenant-in-chief was Thorkil of Warwick, who let it to his brother Godmund. Either Thorkil or his son Siward then granted it to Geoffrey de Clinton, who later gave it to the Priory of Kenilworth, Warwickshire. This was confirmed by Henry II in 1163. The hundred was first called by its present name of Hemlingford Hundred in the Pipe Roll of 8 Henry II (1161–62).

The estate land continued to belong to Kenilworth Priory until the dissolution of the monasteries. The estate was then granted to John Fisher. From 1538, churches were required to keep a record of all births, marriages, and burials in parish registers. Great Packington's records survive from 1538. Poor law records for the parish begin in 1715.

=== Civil War and Early Modern ===
After the English Civil War, the ‘Great Packington Parish: Loss Account’ included claims from 36 parishioners. There are also references in records to Parliamentarian soldiers plundering fish from the Packington pools for food.

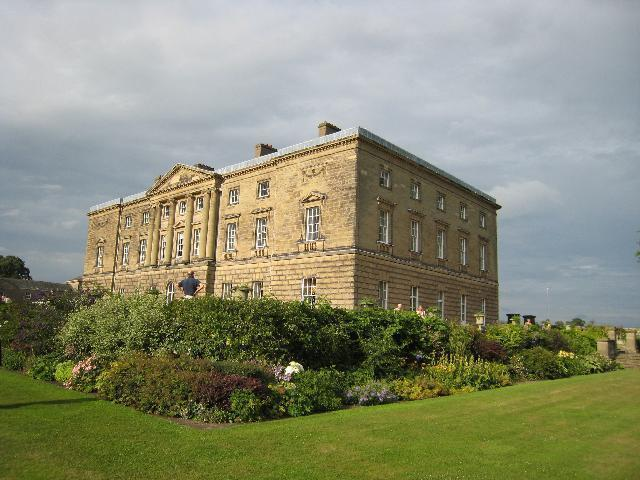
Packington Hall

Packington Manor House (now known as Packington Old Hall) was built in red brick in 1679 for Sir Clement Fisher, 2nd Baronet, and his wife Jane Lane. In 1693 Sir Clement Fisher's nephew, also Sir Clement Fisher, 3rd Baronet, built another larger mansion on the estate, Packington Hall.

Heneage Finch, 2nd Earl of Aylesford, married Mary Fisher, daughter and sole heiress of Sir Clement Fisher, 3rd Baronet in 1712. When the 3rd Barnet died without male heirs in 1729 the Packington estate passed to Mary and her husband and became the seat of the Earls of Aylesford.

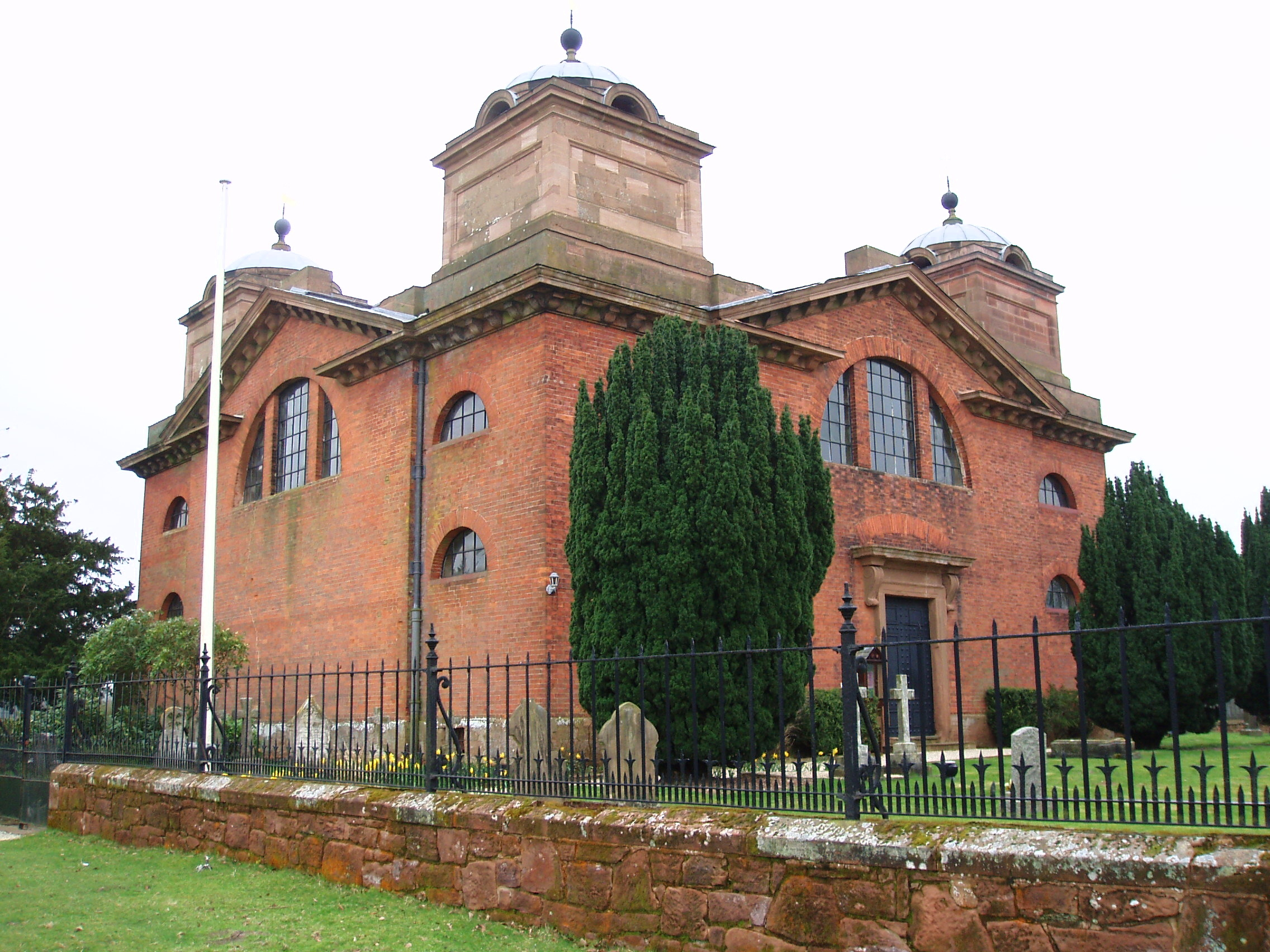
St James' Church

In 1787, it was found that the steeple of Great Packington's parish church was in a bad condition and the church was demolished. It was replaced by St James' Church by the 4th Earl of Aylesford, following designs after the temple at Pæstum by Italian architect Joseph Bonomi. The foundation stone for St. James was laid on 23 April 1789. During the construction of St James' Church baptisms and marriages were held at St Bartholomew’s Church in the neighbouring parish of Little Packington, Warwickshire.

A man was struck by lightning and died in 1789 in the parish, and a monument was placed where he died to commemorate the death and warn others of the dangers of sheltering under trees during a lightning storm. The inscription read: "On Thursday September 3 1789, William Cawley, of London, Farrier, was on this spot struck dead by lightening. To commemorate this awful event, as well as to warn others from exposing themselves to the same danger, by taking shelter in a thunder storm under trees, this monument is erected."

=== Long 19th century ===
Great Packington has a small population, with the historic peak between 1801 and 1861. There were 340 inhabitants in 1848 and the Population Gazetteer of England and Wales and the Islands in the British Seas reported the population in 1864 as 336 inhabitants.

Great Packington became part of the Poor Law Union of Meriden in 1836. The Meriden Union workhouse housed two inmates who were born in Great Packington when the 1881 census was taken. The church living was united with the living of Little Packington in 1860.

=== World wars ===
A memorial was erected inside St James Church in memory of men of the parish who served during the First World War, including six who gave their lives.

An article in the Midland Daily Telegraph recorded that the joint population of Great and Little Packington in 1939 was 250 inhabitants.

During the Second World War, Packington Hall hosted a barracks for the United States Army, with a capacity for 4,490 men. From 5 July 1944, the grounds of Packington Hall were also used by the United States Army as a Rehabilitation and Reconditioning centre for wounded soldiers, designated as the 825th Convalescent Center.

Several Great Packington men served in the Second World War, including the 9th Earl of Aylesford, who was killed in action at Dunkirk.

=== Modern history ===
Between 1995 and 1999 sand and gravel were extracted from land on the Packington Estate. When the quarrying ceased, work began to convert the area into a 22-hectare nature reserve and the Royal Society for the Protection of Birds (RSPB) supported the development of a ten-year biodiversity strategy. The reserve opened to the public in 2001. In 2010, Natural England supported the conversion of a further 16 acres of former farmland at the site into wet grassland.

Great Packington is also notable for the number of pools of water in the parish, many of which are now used by Packington Fisheries. The parish also features some of the highest land in England and is neighbour to the traditional centre of England, Meriden.

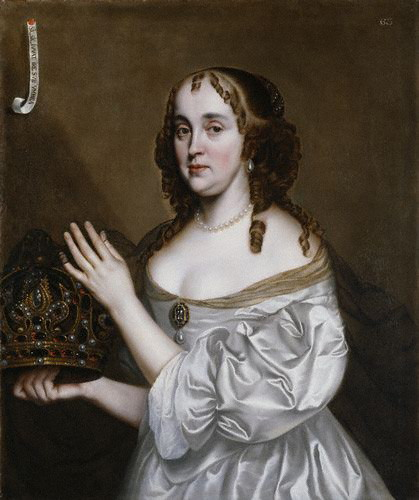
Jane Lane, Lady Fisher

== Notable people associated with Great Packington ==
- Augusta Legge nee Finch, Countess of Dartmouth
- Heneage Finch, 7th Earl of Aylesford
- Jane Lane, Lady Fisher, who helped Charles II to escape England in 1651 after the Battle of Worcester
- Rev. Richard Mudge, vicar and composer
