= Packington Hall =

Mansion in Great Packington, Warwickshire, England

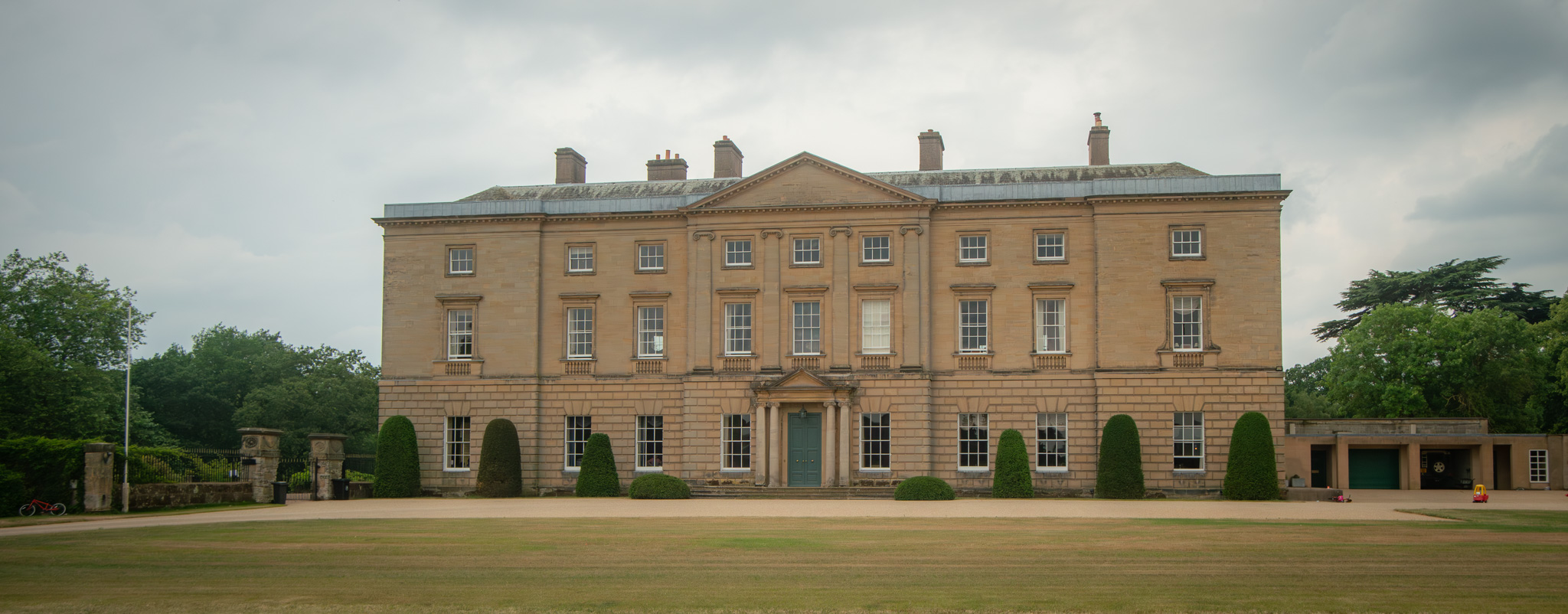
- Interactive map of Packington Hall
- 52.4520°N 1.6737°W
- Location: Great Packington, Warwickshire, England

Listed Building – Grade II*
- Official name: Packington Hall
- Designated: 11 November 1952
- Reference no.: 1116473

Listed Building – Grade II
- Official name: Stable Block at Packington Hall
- Designated: 11 November 1952
- Reference no.: 1034845

National Register of Historic Parks and Gardens
- Official name: Packington Hall
- Type: Grade II*
- Designated: 1 February 1986
- Reference no.: 1001193

Packington Hall is a 17th-century mansion situated at Great Packington, near Meriden in Warwickshire, England and is the seat of the Earl of Aylesford. It is a Grade II* listed building.

== History ==
Arms of Fisher of Great Packington, Warwickshire: Argent, a chevron vair between three demi-lions rampant gules

Packington Hall was built in 1693 for Sir Clement Fisher on whose death in 1729 the Packington estate passed to his daughter Mary Fisher, who married Heneage Finch, 2nd Earl of Aylesford.

Arms of Finch, Earls of Aylesford: Argent, a chevron between three griffins passant sable

The Park was designed by Capability Brown in 1751, who created a large serpentine lake called Hall Pool by joining up several old mill and fish ponds in front of the Hall.

The Hall was remodelled for the 3rd Earl of Aylesford by Matthew Brettingham from 1766, with the work continuing after Brettingham's death in 1769 under Henry Couchman. It was then extended and improved for the 4th Earl of Aylesford in Palladian style to designs by Italian architect Joseph Bonomi in 1772. The ceiling paintings were by John Francis Rigaud.

Stables were added to the Hall in the 1760s by the 3rd Earl of Aylesford, constructed by David Hiorne, to house horses and carriages. In 1787, the carriage turn outside the east of the Hall was levelled under the supervision of John Wedge. The Stables are Grade II listed buildings.

It was severely damaged by fire in 1979 but has since been fully restored. The renovations were kept as near as possible to the original design.

The main entrance to the grounds from the A45 road features a pair of wrought-iron gates which were presented to the Earl of Aylesford by his tenants in 1935.

The house is not generally open to the public but is available by arrangement for conferences and functions.

An earlier manor house (Packington Old Hall) and an 18th-century parish church St James' Church, Great Packington stand on the estate.

== Sources ==
- A History of the County of Warwick, Volume 4 (1947) from British History Online
- Historic England. "Grade II* (1116473)". National Heritage List for England.
