= Samwell =

Surname list

Samwell is a surname or given name, and may refer to:

- David Samwell (1751–1798), Welsh naval surgeon and poet
- Ian Samwell (1937–2003), English musician, songwriter and producer
- Samwell (birth name: Sam Norman), musician/actor known for his song and video "What What (In the Butt)"
- Samwell Tarly, a character in George R. R. Martin's series A Song of Ice and Fire
- Sir William Samwell (1559–1628), Auditor of the Exchequer to Queen Elizabeth I of England
- William Samwell (1628–1676), Architect

Four Samwell Baronets have had the surname Samwell including:

- Sir Thomas Samwell, 1st Baronet (1654–1694) MP for Northamptonshire 1689–1690 and Northampton 1690–1694
- Sir Thomas Samwell, 2nd Baronet (1687–1757) MP for Coventry 1715–1722

== See also ==
- Samwel
