= William Samwell =

William Samwell may refer to:

- William Samwell (Auditor of the Exchequer) (1559–1628), Auditor of the Exchequer to Elizabeth I of England
- William Samwell (architect) (1628–1676), English architect
