= Thomas Samwell =

Thomas Samwell may refer to:

- Sir Thomas Samwell, 1st Baronet of Upton (1654–1694) MP for Northamptonshire 1689-1690 and Northampton 1690-1694
- Sir Thomas Samwell, 2nd Baronet of Upton (1687–1757) MP for Coventry 1715-1722
