= Sprowston =

Town and civil parish in Norfolk, England

Coordinates: 52.6561°N 1.3211°E

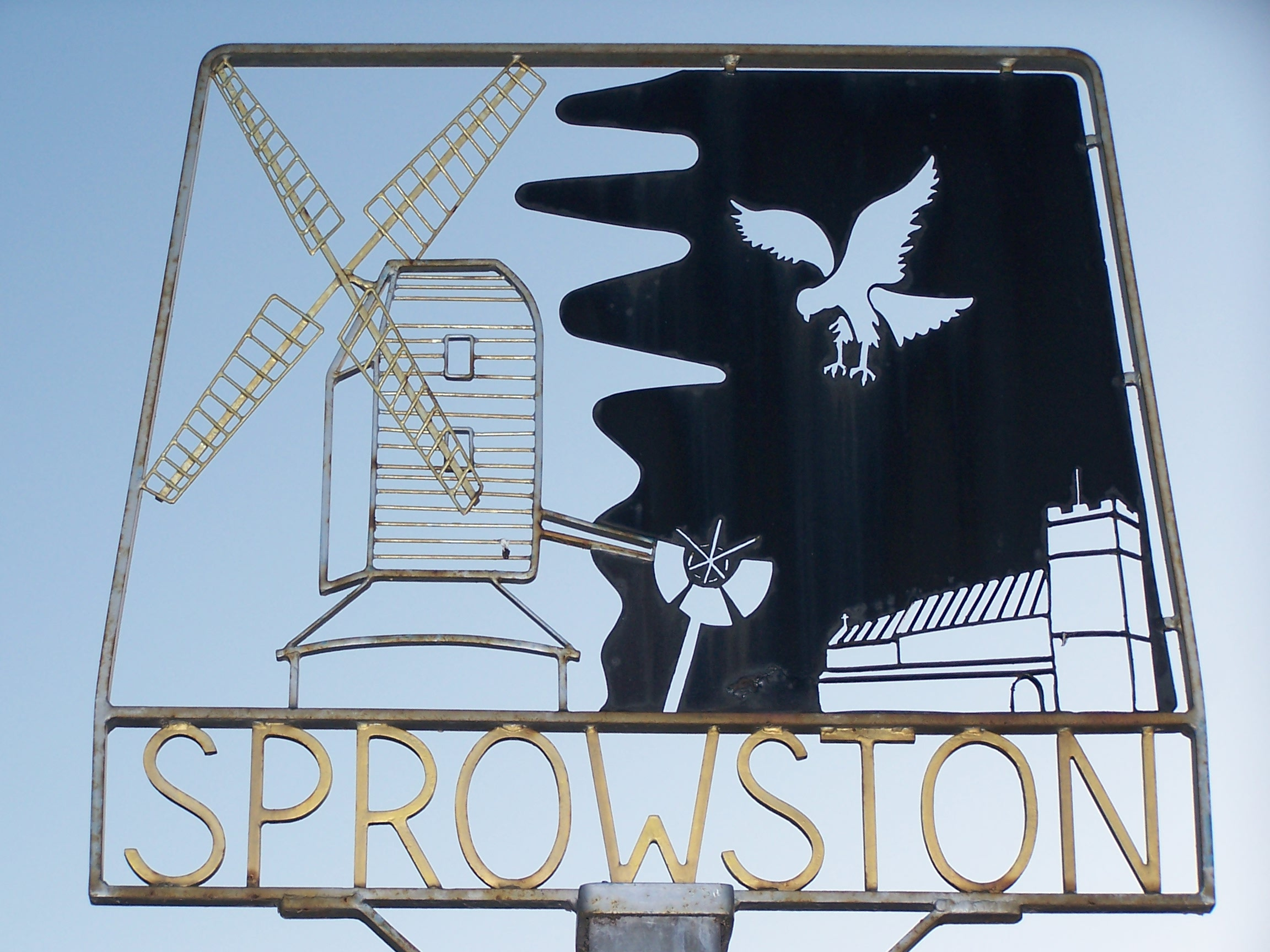
- Village sign

- Location within Norfolk
- Area: 9.46 km^{2} (3.65 sq mi)
- Population: 17,126 (2021)
  - Density: 1,810/km^{2} (4,700/sq mi)
- OS grid reference: TG252121
- Civil parish: Sprowston
- District: Broadland
- Shire county: Norfolk
- Region: East
- Country: England
- Sovereign state: United Kingdom
- Post town: NORWICH
- Postcode district: NR6, NR7
- Dialling code: 01603
- Police: Norfolk
- Fire: Norfolk
- Ambulance: East of England
- UK Parliament: Norwich North

Sprowston (/ˈsproʊstən/) is a town and civil parish in the Broadland district of Norfolk, England that forms part of suburban area aound Norwich. It is bounded by Heartsease to the east, Mousehold Heath and the suburb of New Sprowston to the south, Old Catton to the west, and by the open farmland of Beeston St Andrew to the north. It lies 2.7 miles (4.3 km) north-north-east of Norwich. The 2021 census recorded a population of 17,126, making Sprowston the most populous civil parish in the Broadland district.

== Toponymy and pronunciation ==
The name is Anglo-Saxon and means "the settlement belonging to Sprow"; it is derived from the OE Sprow and tun (enclosure, settlement or farm).

Pronounced "Spro’stun", "[the] Anglo-Saxon man's name Sprow tells linguistic scientists all we need to know to state, categorically, that the modern pronunciation of Sprowston ought to be with the vowel of low and not of now."

== History ==
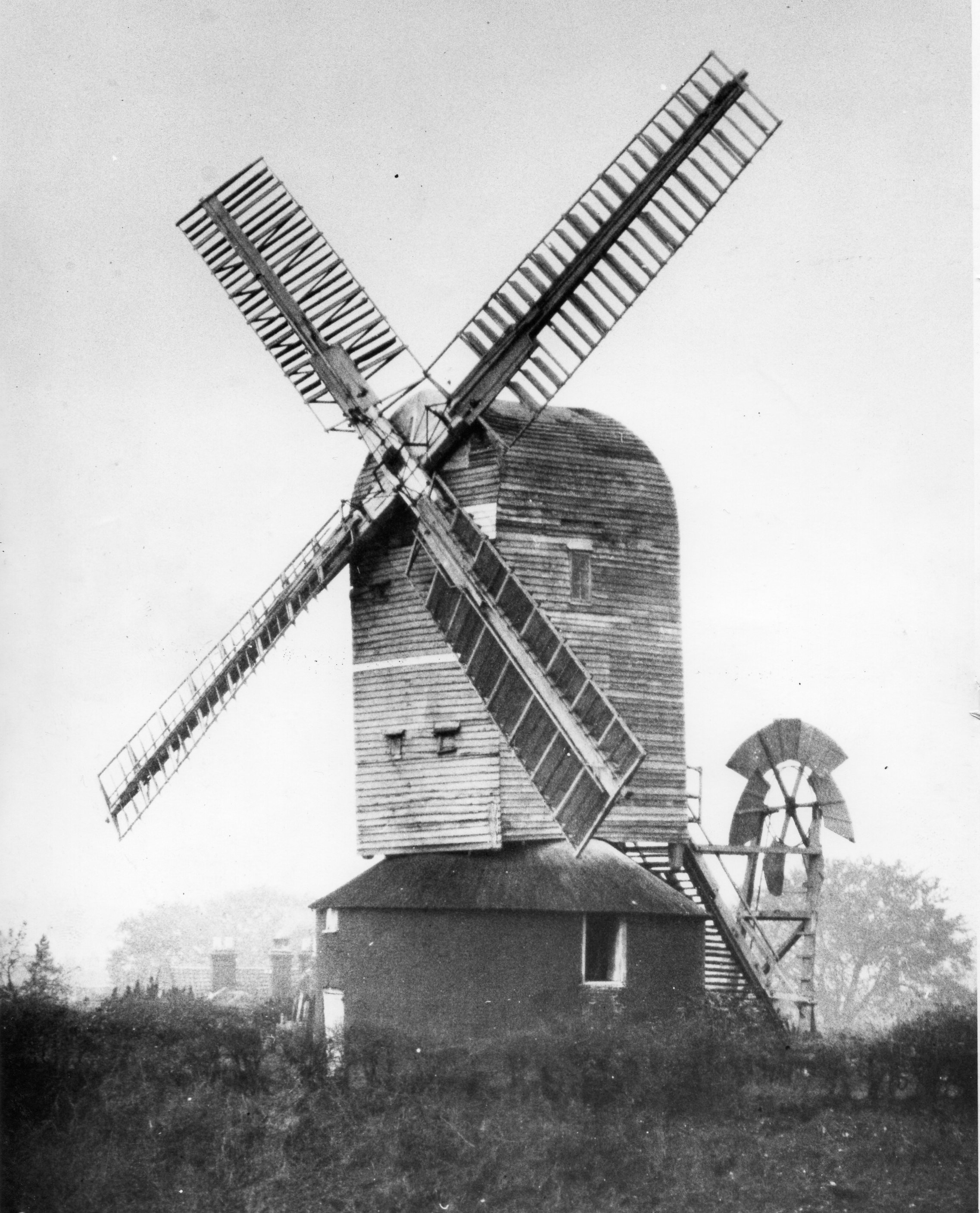
Sprowston Mill c.1925

Sprowston was recorded as Sprowestuna in the Domesday Book of 1086.

By 1186, one Manor was held by the Mounteney family, on behalf of Sir Richard de Luci, who kept it for some 250 years; the other, held by the de Sproustons and then the Aslakes, was owned by the Bishop of Norwich.

In 1545, the Jermy family granted Mounteney Manor to John Corbet. During Kett's rebellion in 1549, the house was broken into and looted. The army of Robert Kett encamped on nearby Mousehold Heath.

The first Sprowston Hall was built in 1560. The Aslakes Manor passed to an eminent family of Norfolk gentry, the Calthorpes; it was related subsequently by marriage to family of Anne Boleyn). It was later sold to Sir Thomas Corbet (owner of Mounteney Manor) and, in 1592, the two Manors were united.

Monuments to the Corbet family can be found at the parish church of St Mary and St Margaret in Church Lane. The Sprowston Corbets were Royalists in the English Civil War; Thomas Corbet was knighted by Charles I at Royston. However, Sir Thomas' uncle, Miles Corbet, who was Member of Parliament for Great Yarmouth, was the last signatory to the death warrant of Charles I and was himself executed at the restoration of Charles II.

Sir Thomas Corbet became High Sheriff of Norfolk in 1612. He died without an heir and the manor of Sprowston was sold to Sir Thomas Adams, who had been Lord Mayor of London in 1645. He had given Charles II £10,000 whilst he was in exile and, in 1660, he accompanied General Monck to escort the King back to England.

Adams endowed a Professorship of Arabic at Cambridge and had the Gospels printed in Persian, which he described as "throwing a stone at the head of Mahomet". Although he died in London in 1667, his body was brought to Sprowston for burial in a barrel vault excavated under the altar at St Mary and St Margaret; a large marble monument was erected above it.

In the 18th century, the manor was sold to Sir Lambert Blackwell, a governor of the South Sea Company and he was created a baronet in 1718. In the 19th century, the manor went through a number of families until it came into the hands of the Gurneys. In 1876, John Gurney, who was mayor of Norwich and blind, rebuilt Sprowston Hall. In 1885, he gave money for the building of St Cuthbert's Church and a new vicarage to serve the development known as New Sprowston which was being built. In 1973, Sprowston Hall was converted into a hotel and is the location of Sprowston Manor Golf Club.

During the 18th century, it was recorded that the population was less than 200; by 1901, it had increased to 2,359.

Sprowston Mill was built in 1780 and made famous by John Crome, of the Norwich School of painting. It burnt down in 1933, a few days before it was to be handed over to the Norfolk Archaeological Trust, but is still used as a symbol by Sprowston Community High School and is depicted on the village sign.

The artist Thomas Lound was born in Sprowston in 1801.

== Governance ==
In 2011, Sprowston chose to move from being a parish council to town council, but not to use the title mayor for the council chair. The chair choose to use the title Town Mayor in 2022. The area forms part of Broadland District Council and the UK parliamentary constituency of Norwich North; the seat has been held by Alice Macdonald (Labour) since July 2024.

== Education ==
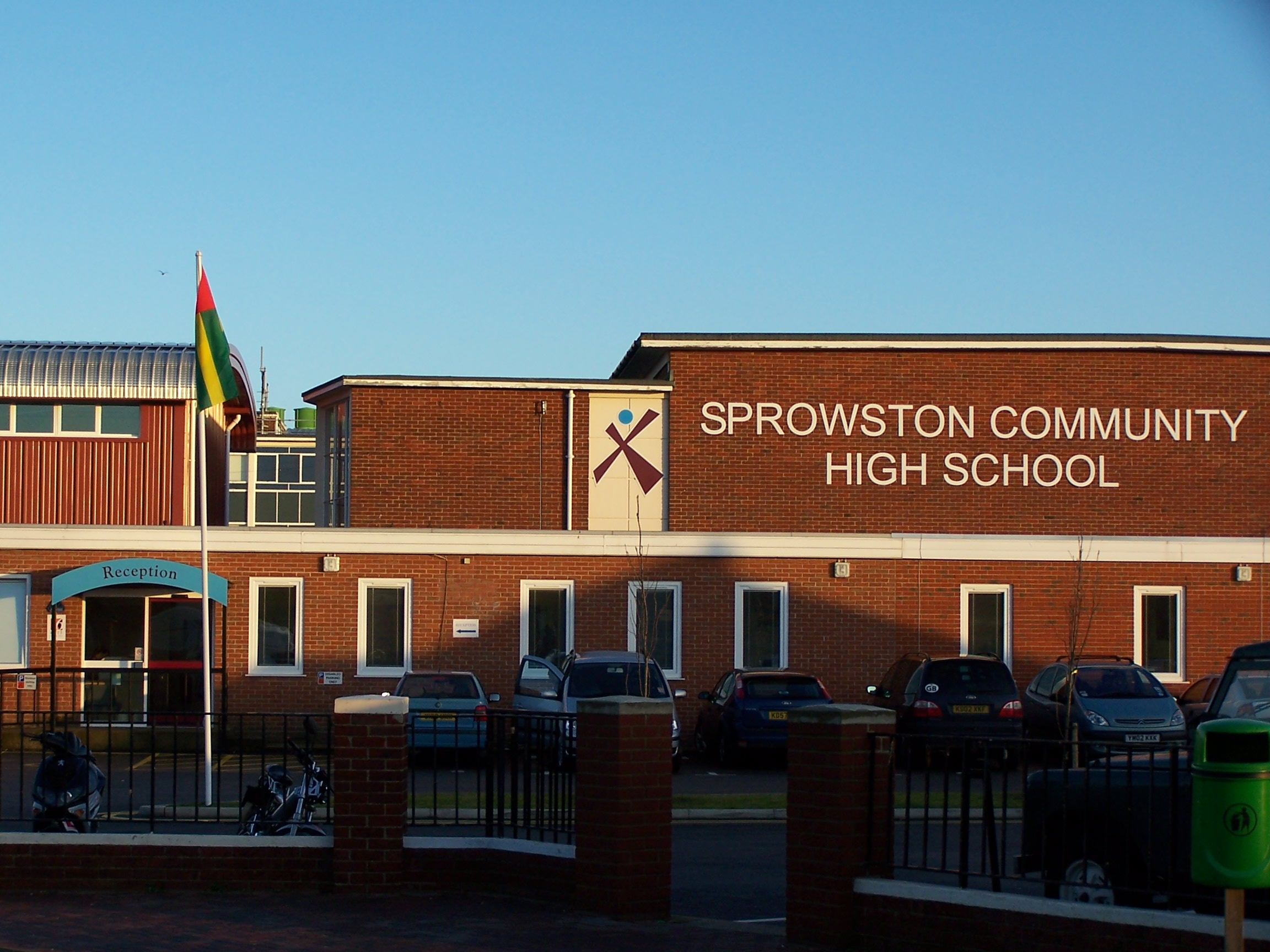
Sprowston Community Academy

Sprowston Community Academy (Note: Formerly named 'Sprowston Community High School' and originally 'Sprowston High School'.) is a mixed community academy of around 1,750 students, serving ages 11–18, with an independent sixth form. It transitioned into an academy in 2018 and assumed its current name; it forms part of the Broad Horizons Education Trust.

There are three junior schools: Falcon, Sprowston and White Woman Lane; and three infant schools: Cecil Gowing, Sparhawk and Sprowston.

== Religion ==
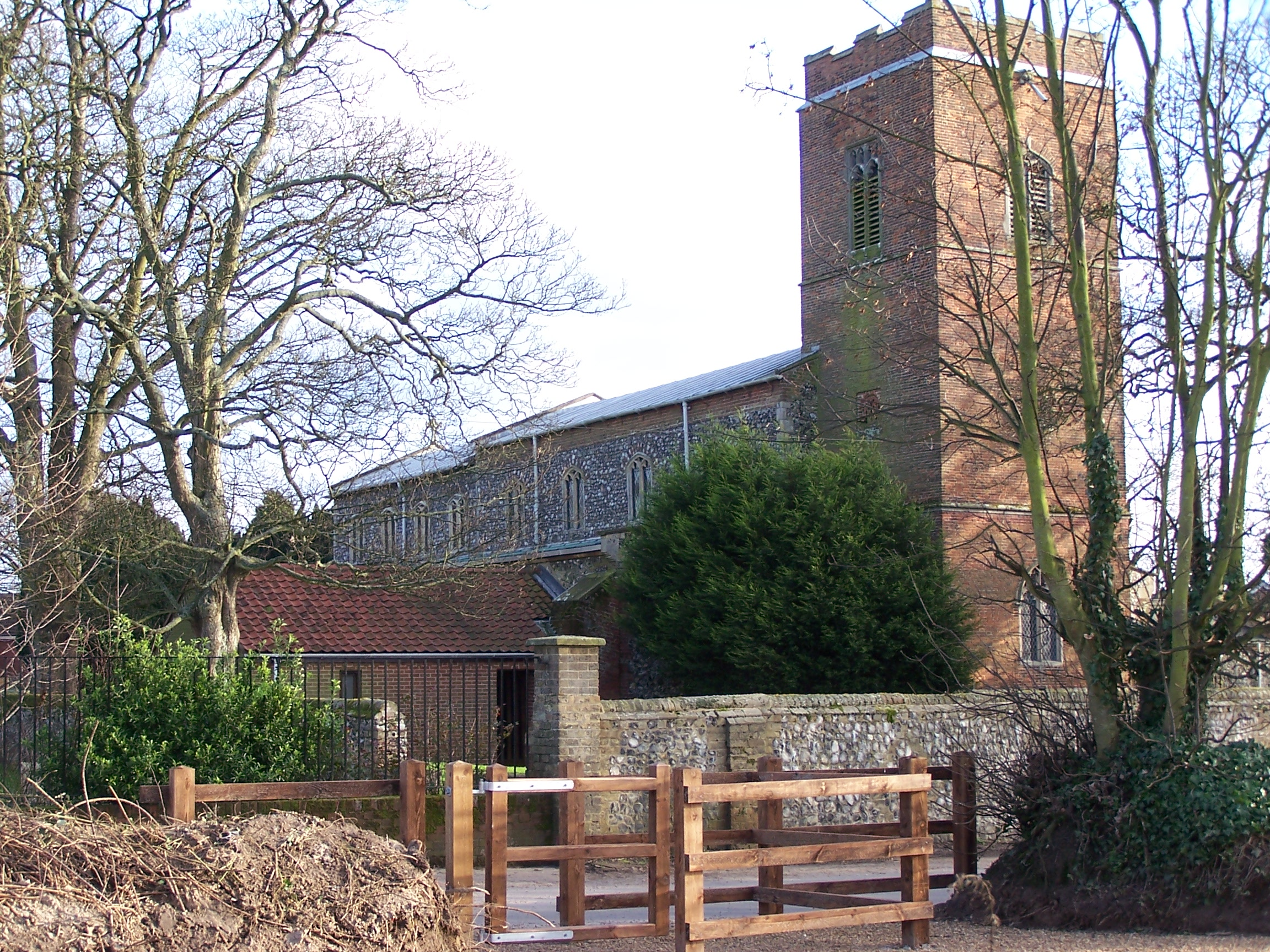
St Mary & St Margaret's Church

The town has three churches: St Mary and St Margaret's (the Anglican parish church), St Cuthbert's (Anglican) and the Sprowston Methodist Church. There is one chapel, called Gage Road Chapel.

== Leisure ==
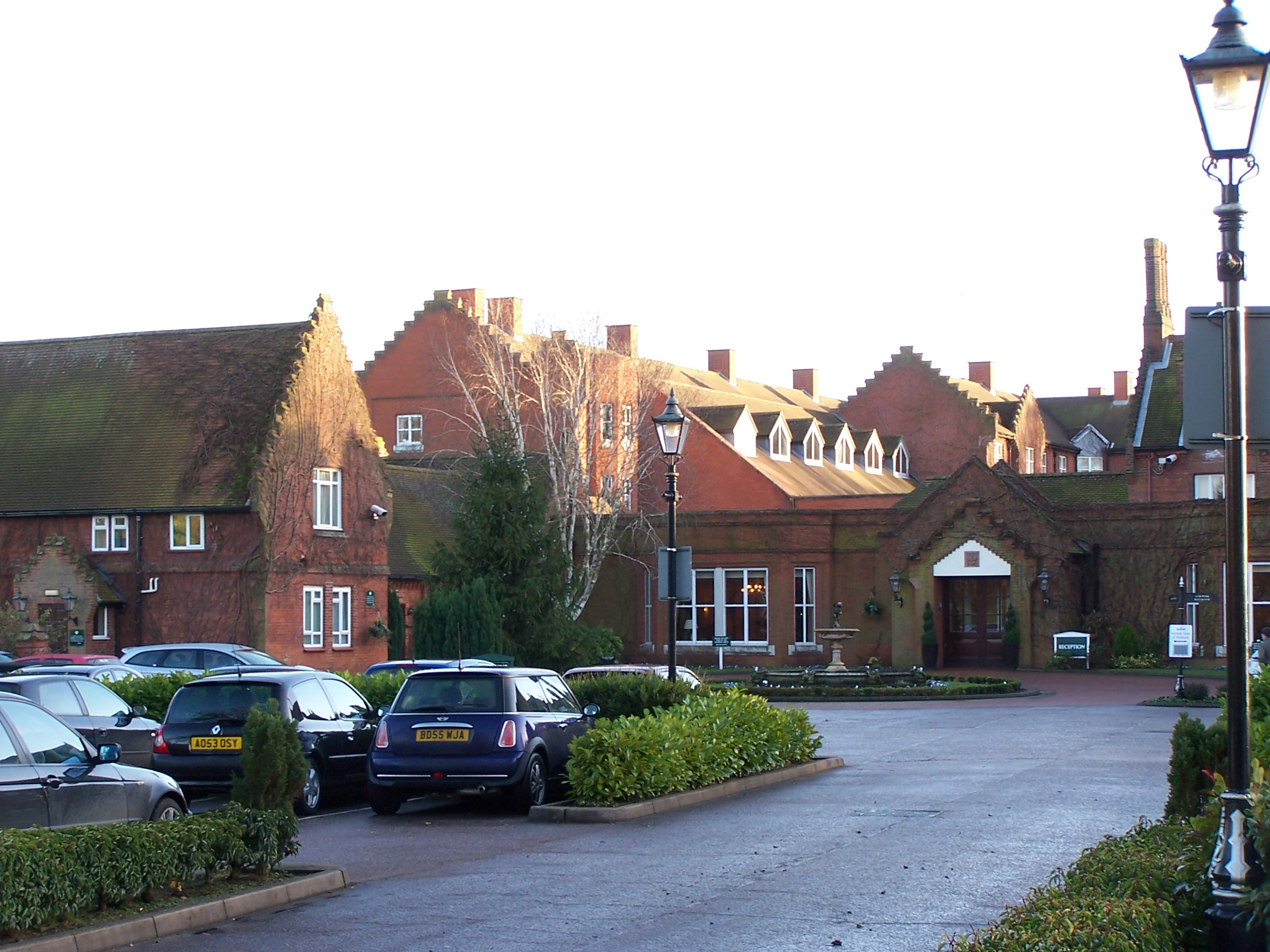
Sprowston Hall

Sprowston Manor Hotel and Sprowston Manor Golf Club are located in the former Sprowston Hall. Sprowston Cricket Club plays its home matches at Barker's Lane. From 2024, Norfolk County Cricket Club matches were held at the ground, with the club moving to play its representative matches on the ground from 2025.

== Transport ==
Bus services in the area are provided primarily by First Eastern Counties and Sanders Coaches; routes connect the town with Norwich city centre, Norfolk and Norwich University Hospital, Hoveton, Wroxham and Old Catton

The nearest National Rail station is Norwich. It provides direct services to locations throughout East Anglia and to London, operated by Greater Anglia.

== Gallery ==
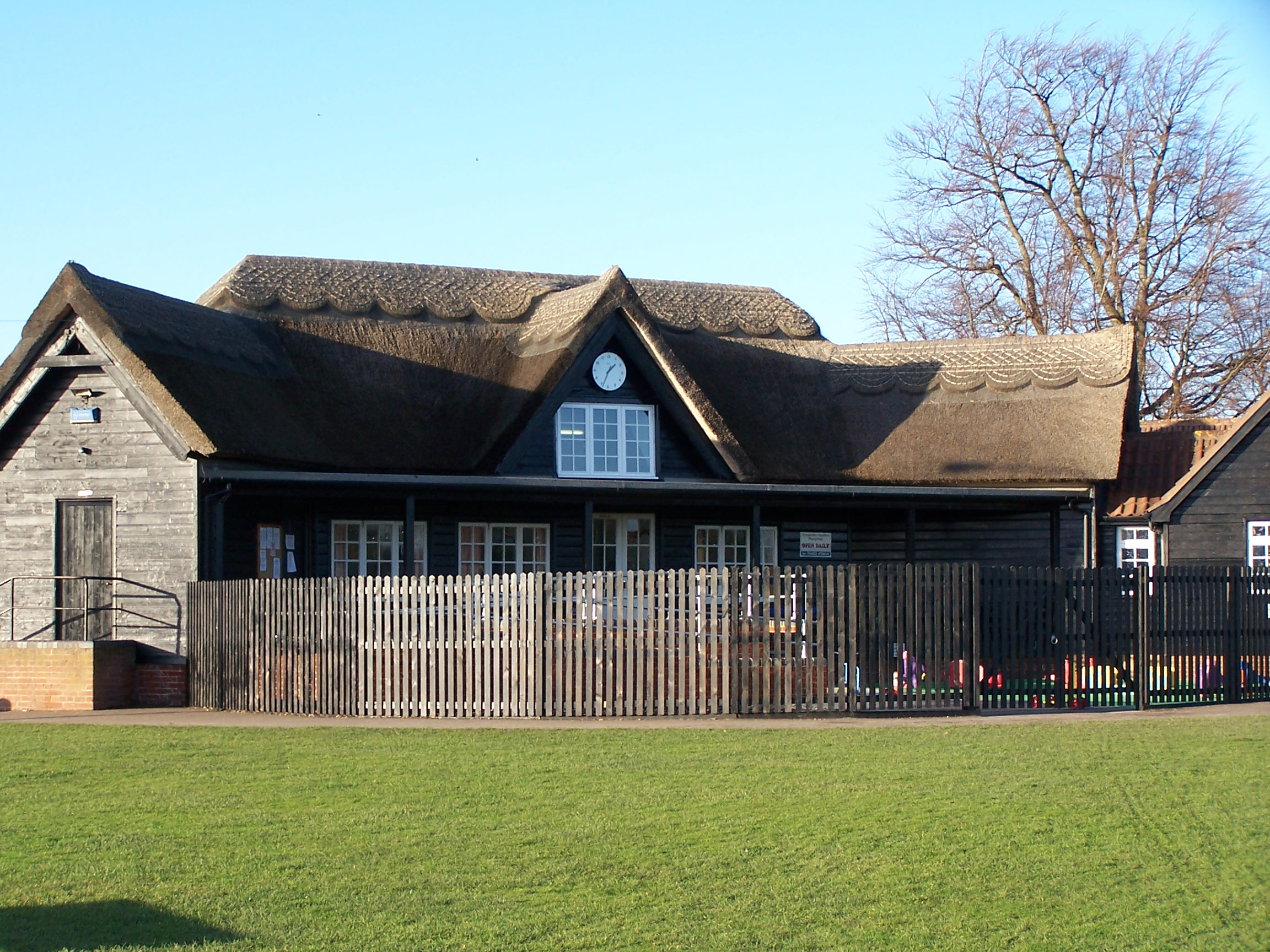
The pavilion on the recreation ground

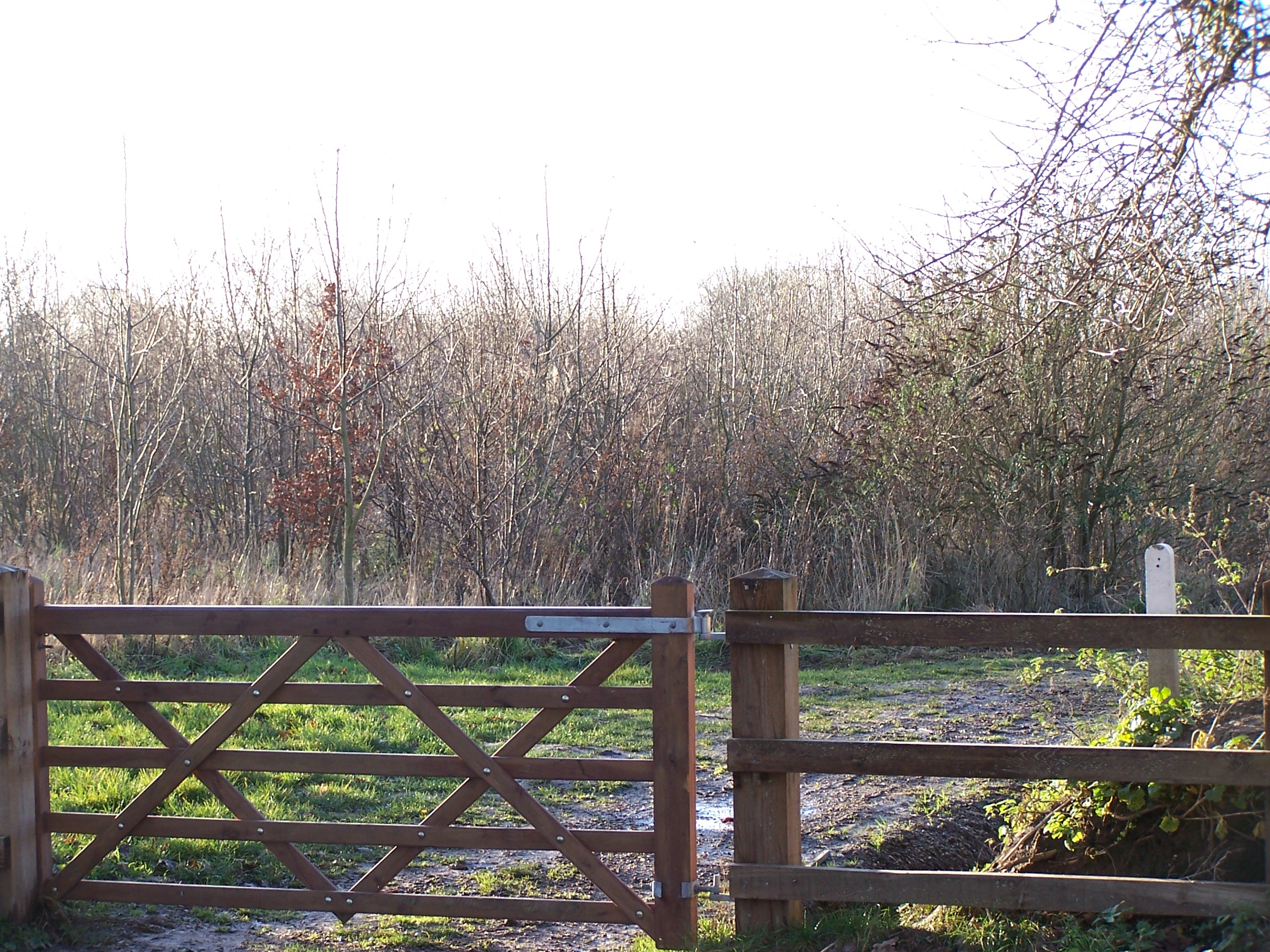
The Millennium Wood

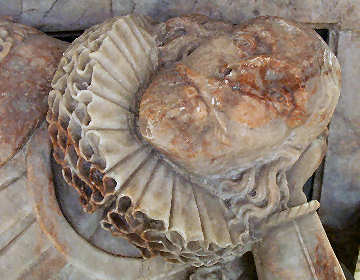
Effigy from the tomb of Sir Thomas Adams

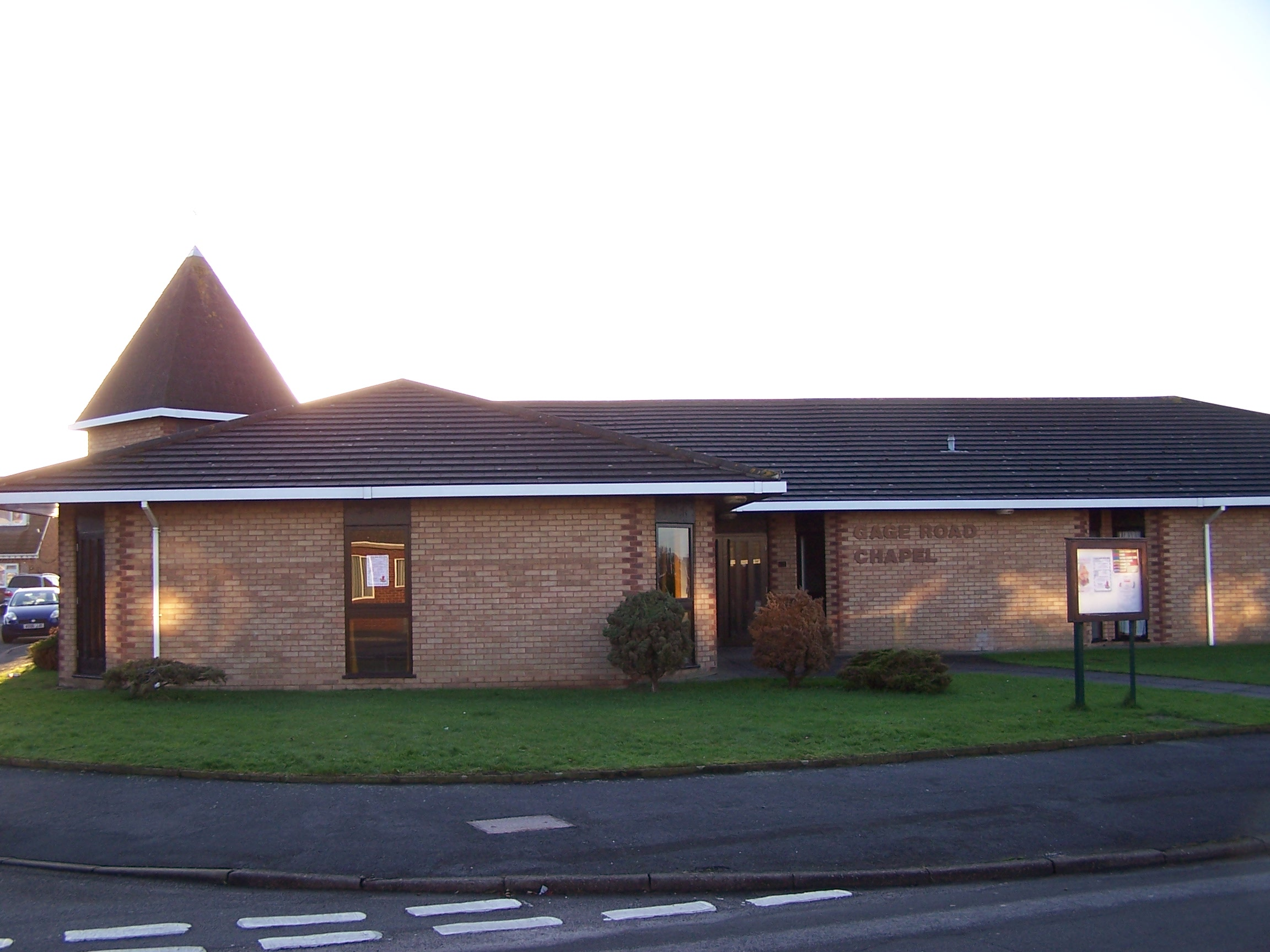
Gage Road Chapel

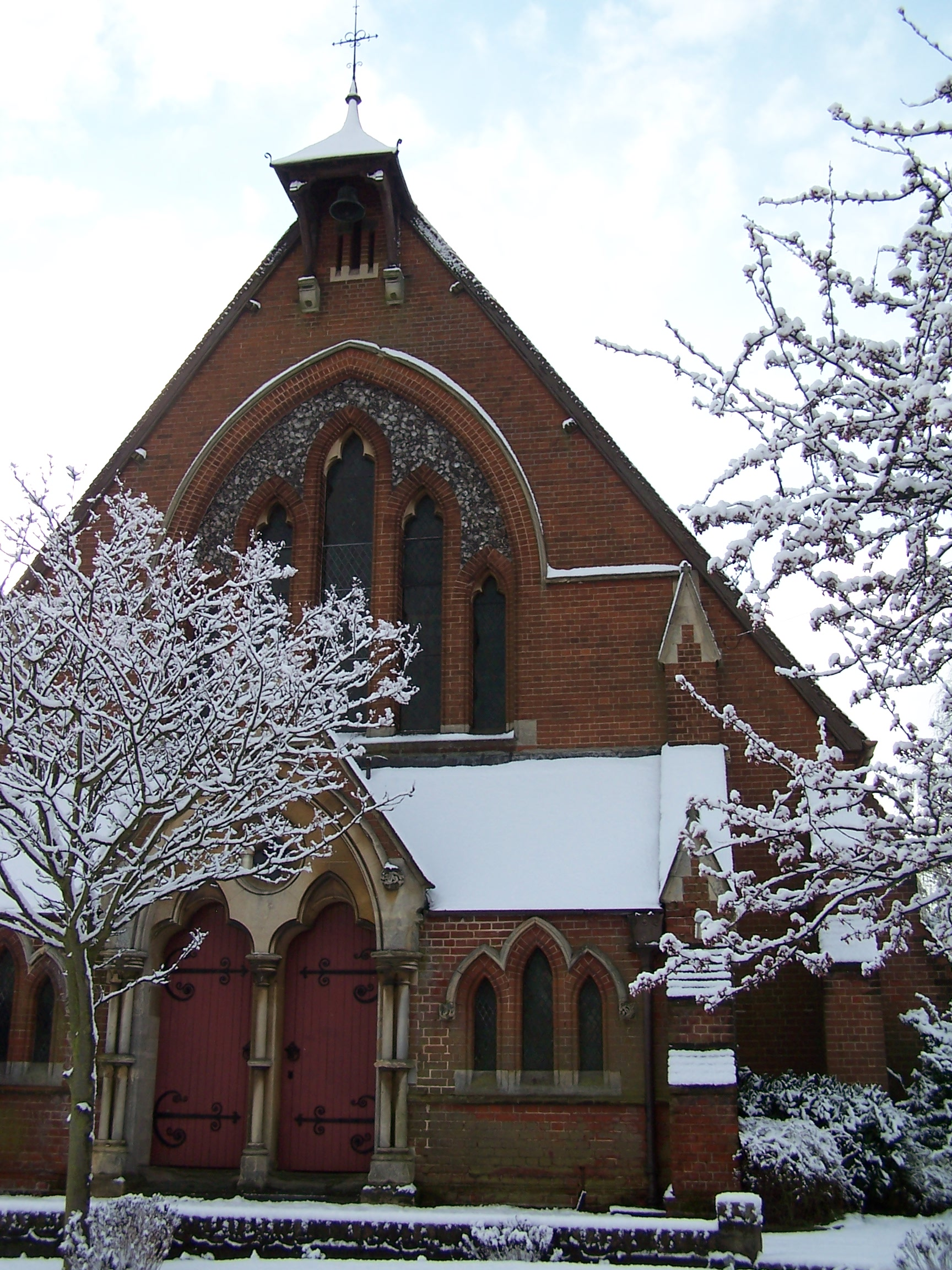
St Cuthbert's Church

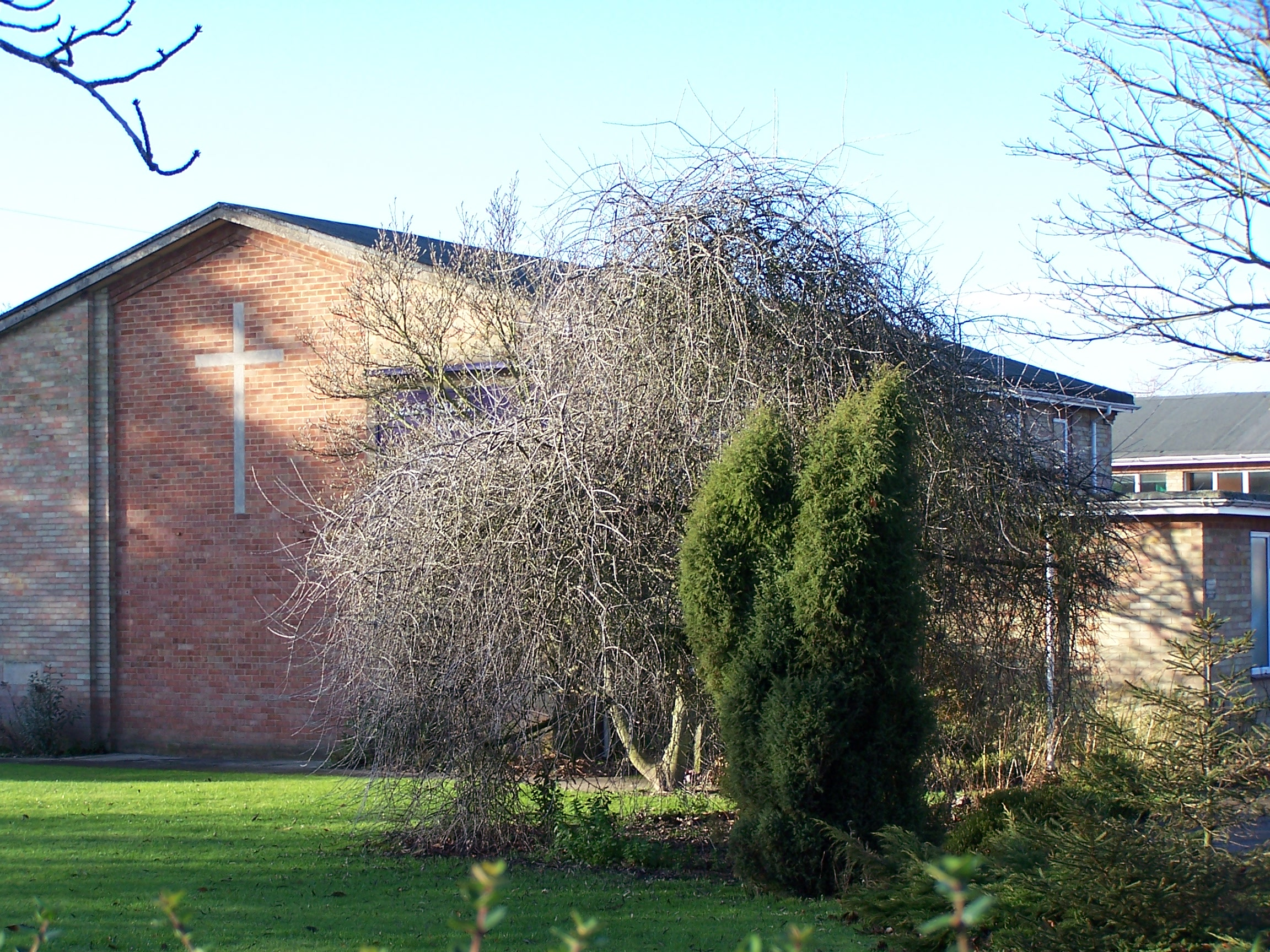
Wroxham Road Methodist Church

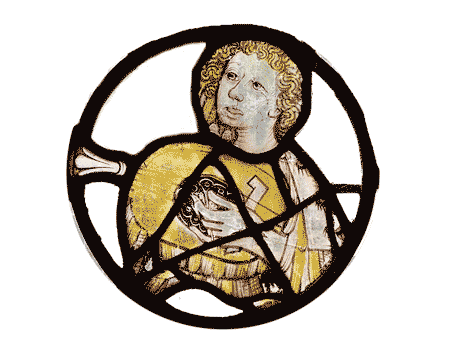
Medieval glass in the parish church
