= Saywell =

Saywell is a surname. Notable people with the surname include:

- John Saywell (1929–2011), Canadian historian
- Michael Saywell (1942–2023), British equestrian
- Thomas Saywell (1837–1928), Australian tobacco manufacturer, property developer, mine owner, and business person
- William Saywell (1643–1701), English Anglican archdeacon and academic
- William G. Saywell (born 1936), Canadian historian

== See also ==
- Samwell
