= Fulwar =

Fulwar is a given name and a surname. Notable people with the name include:

- Fulwar Craven, 4th Baron Craven (died 1764), English landowner and sportsman
- Fulwar Skipwith, 2nd Baronet (1676–1728), English landowner, Member of Parliament for Coventry
- Fulwar Skipwith (1765–1839), American diplomat and politician
- Thomas Fulwar (died 1667), Irish Anglican priest

== See also ==
- Fuller (surname)
