= Sprowston Manor =

Sprowston Manor Hotel
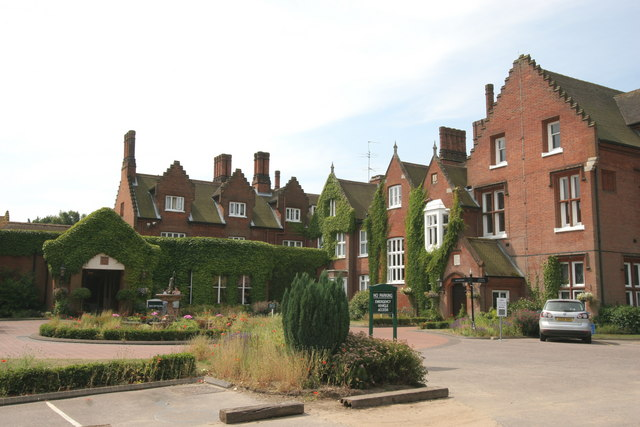
- Sprowston Manor Hotel

- Norfolk
- Hotel chain: Britannia Hotels

General information
- Location: Sprowston, Norfolk, England
- Coordinates: 52°39′52.03″N 1°20′28.99″E
- Opening: 1973

Technical details
- Floor count: 3

Other information
- Number of rooms: 94 en suite bedrooms
- Number of suites: 19
- Number of restaurants: 2, The restaurant 1559; Cafe Bar & Grill
- Number of bars: 2 bars, 1559 Lounge Bar and Zest Cafe, Bar & Grill
- Facilities: 18 hole golf course On-site indoor swimming pool and spa
- Parking: Yes

Sprowston Manor Hotel is an AA 4 star hotel, part of which is the 19th-century Sprowston Hall. It is located in Sprowston, Norfolk, England, close to the city of Norwich.

== Location ==
The hotel is situated within 170 acres of parkland. It is 3.5 miles (5.6 km) north east of the centre of the city of Norwich and is 4.3 miles (6.9 km) from Norwich railway station. The nearest airport is in Norwich and is 4.8 miles (7.7 km) west of the hotel.

=== History ===
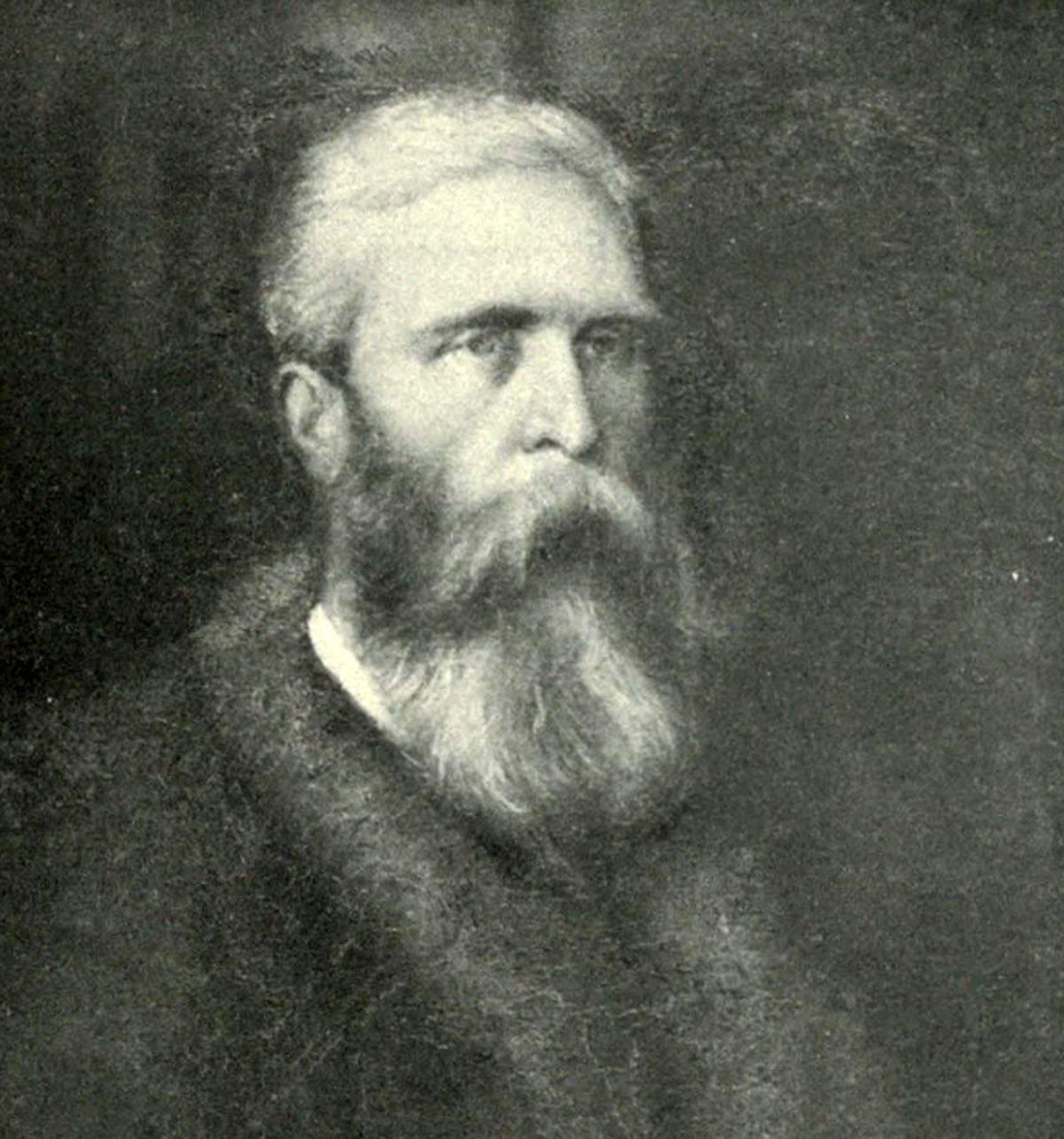
John Gurney builder of Sprowston Manor.

Sprowston Hall was purchased by John Corbet II formerly belonging to the Bishop of Norwich, for £176 in 1540. On the death of John Corbet II in 1559 the manor of Sprowston was left to his wife Jane. It was sold to Sir Thomas Adams, who was Lord Mayor of London in 1645. In the 18th century the manor was acquired by Sir Lambert Blackwell, a governor of the South Sea Company, who was created a baronet in 1718. In the 19th century the manor went through a number of families until it came into the hands of the Gurney family and John Gurney, who was mayor of Norwich and blind, rebuilt the hall between 1872 and 1876. The hall is constructed in three storeys of red brick.

During the Second World War the hall was commandeered by the military for use by the GOC Eastern Command.

=== Hotel ===
The manor house underwent major redevelopment in 1973, when it was converted to a Marriott hotel. The hotel has a total of 94 en- suite rooms of which 19 are suites. Part of the hotels 170 acre parkland is an 18-hole championship golf course. There is also an indoor swimming pool and spa. The hotel has 12 meeting rooms and frequently hosts conferences, banquets, exhibitions and is used as a wedding venue. Sprowston Manor is also home to the 1559 Restaurant which is located in the oldest part of the building, and also Cafe, Bar and Grill. The hotel was originally operated by Marriott Hotels & Resorts until March 2018 when it was taken over by Britannia Hotels. This was along with 5 other Marriott hotels across the UK. The hotel is approached along an oak lined driveway. Features of the original manor house include high ceilings and oak paneling to some of the rooms.

=== Championship golf course ===
The golf course at Sprowston Manor replaced the hotel's original layout in 2003, incorporating an additional 20 hectares to produce a course measuring 6500 yards, with a par of 71 and including 70 bunkers.
