= George FitzRoy =

George FitzRoy may refer to:

- George FitzRoy, Duke of Northumberland (1665–1716)
- George FitzRoy, 4th Duke of Grafton (1760–1844)
- George FitzRoy, Earl of Euston (1715–1747)
