= Adolphus Oughton =

British Army officer and politician

Brigadier-General Sir Adolphus Oughton Bt
- Born: c. 1685
- Died: 4 September 1736

Oughton baronets
- Escutcheon of the Oughton baronets of Tetchbrook
- Creation date: 1718
- Status: Extinct
- Extinction date: 1736

Sir Adolphus Oughton, 1st Baronet (c. 1685 – 4 September 1736), of Tachbrook, Warwickshire, was a British Army officer and politician.

Oughton was the son of Adolphus Oughton and Mary Samwell, daughter of Richard Samwell, of Upton, Northamptonshire. and educated at Trinity College, Oxford and the Middle Temple (1703).

He joined the British Army and was a captain and lieutenant-colonel in the 1st Foot Guards (1706), a 1st major and colonel in the Coldstream Guards (1715) and a lieutenant-colonel (1717) in the 8th Dragoons, of which regiment he assumed the colonelcy in 1733. He was promoted brigadier-general in 1735. He was Groom of the Bedchamber to the Prince of Wales from 1714 to 1717.

He sat as Member of Parliament for Coventry between 1715 and 1736. In 1718 he was created a baronet, of Tetchbrook in the County of Warwick.

He died in September 1736. He had first married his cousin, Frances Wagstaffe, daughter and heir of Sir Thomas Wagstaffe and the widow of Sir Edward Bagot, 4th Baronet, M.P., of Blithfield, Staffordshire. He secondly married Elizabeth, the daughter of John Baber of Sunninghill, Berkshire. He had no legitimate children and thus the baronetcy became extinct, although he did however leave an illegitimate son, James Adolphus Dickenson Oughton, who became a lieutenant-general in the British Army.

Parliament of Great Britain
Preceded by Sir Christopher Hales, Bt; Sir Fulwar Skipwith, Bt	Member of Parliament for Coventry; 1715–1736; With: Sir Thomas Sanwell, Bt 1715–1722; John Neale 1722–1734; John Bird 1734–1736	Succeeded by John Bird; John Neale
Baronetage of Great Britain
New creation	Baronet (of Tetchbrook); 1718–1736	Extinct
Preceded by Blackwell baronets	Oughton baronets of Tetchbrook; 27 August 1718	Succeeded by Fellows baronets
