= John Bird (MP for Coventry) =

John Bird (c. 1694 – 11 January 1771), of Kenilworth, Warwickshire, was a British politician who sat in the House of Commons from 1734 to 1737.

Bird's family had introduced ribbon-weaving to the Coventry area and were prominent silk manufacturers. William Bird was mayor of the town in 1705. John Bird was born about 1694, a son of William Bird. He married, in 1718, Rebecca Martyn (c. 1696 – 7 June 1762), daughter of Francis and Elizabeth (Doughty) Martyn of London and of Blockley.

Bird was given the post of receiver of the land tax for Warwickshire by Walpole in 1723. He held it until 1733, when he decided to stand for Parliament at Coventry on an anti-excise platform. He was elected Member of Parliament for Coventry in a contest at the 1734 British general election but his defeated opponent John Neale continued to pursue a petition against him on the grounds of his property qualifications. In 1737 Bird was offered the post of commissioner of the stamp duties, and resigned his seat to take it up 'for the peace and quiet of the city of Coventry'. After the fall of Walpole in 1742, he lost his position as commissioner of the stamp duties.

Bird died in 1771 at Kenilworth. His son John was the father of William Wilberforce Bird who was also a Member of Parliament for Coventry.

Parliament of Great Britain
Preceded by Sir Adolphus Oughton; John Neale	Member of Parliament for Coventry; 1734–1737; With: Sir Adolphus Oughton 1734-1737; John Neale 1737	Succeeded by John Neale; Earl of Euston
