= John Neale (MP) =

British Member of Parliament (1687–1746)

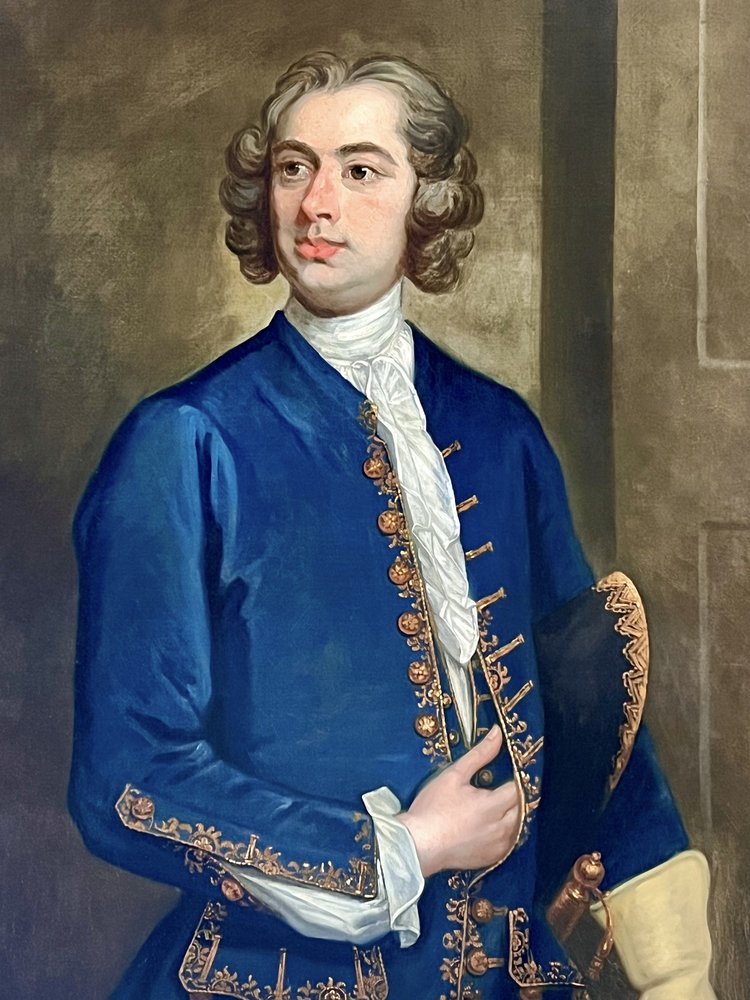
- Born: 1687
- Died: 19 December 1746 (aged 58–59)
- Occupation: Politician
- Spouse(s): Frances Pope
- Children: 3
- Parent(s): Henry Neale; Anna Maria Hanbury

John Neale (1687–1746) of Allesley Park, Warwickshire and Cherington Park, Gloucestershire, was a British landowner and politician who sat in the House of Commons between 1722 and 1741.

== Early life ==
Neale was baptized on 11 July 1687, the eldest son of Henry Neale of Allesley Park and his wife Anna Maria Hanbury, daughter of John Hanbury of Freckenham, Suffolk. He matriculated at Pembroke College, Oxford on 29 March 1705, aged 17, and was admitted at Middle Temple in 1705. He married Frances Pope, daughter of Roger Pope of Oswestry, Shropshire.

== Career ==
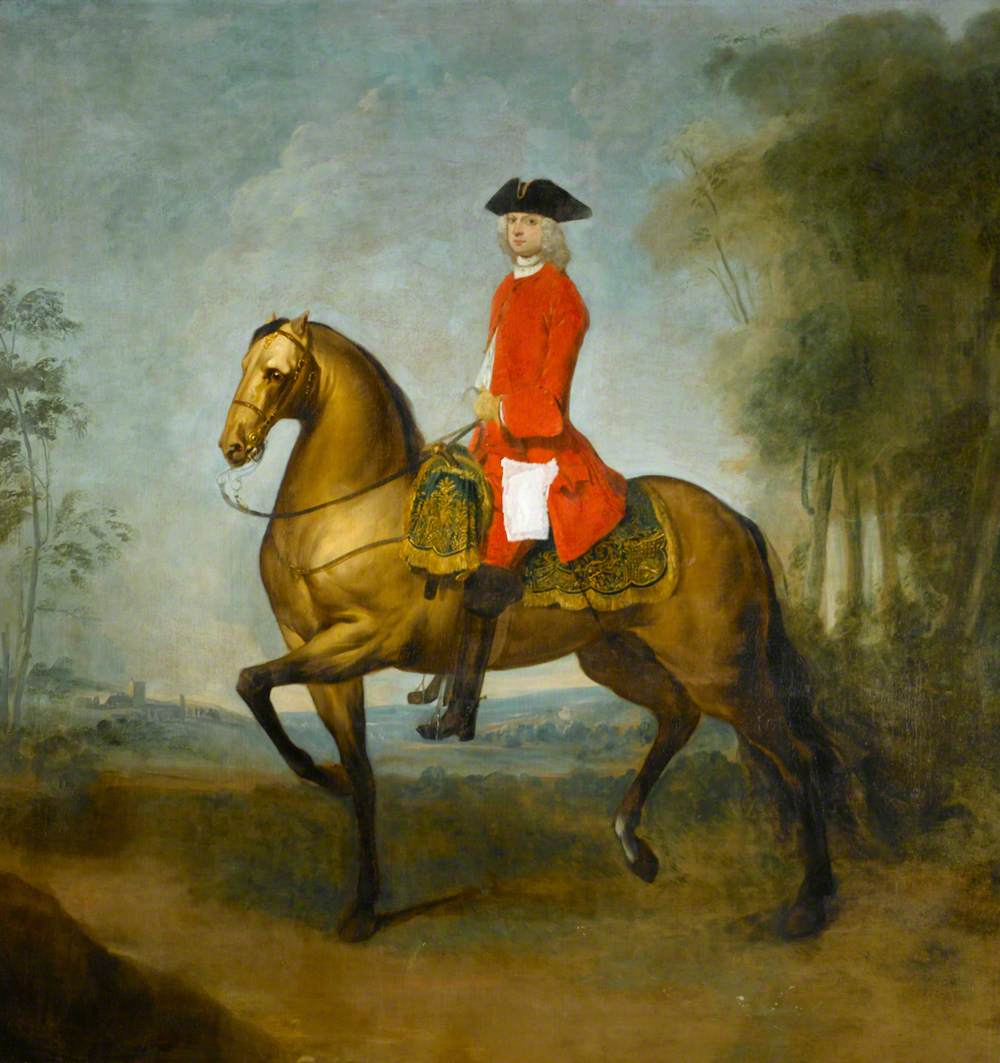
Portrait of Neale by an unknown artist, oil on canvas, held by the Herbert Art Gallery and Museum, Coventry

Neale was returned as a Whig Member of Parliament for Chipping Wycombe at a by-election on 8 February 1722. At the 1722 general election, he was elected MP for Coventry on the corporation interest. The election was declared void on 20 November 1722, but he was returned at a new election on 11 December 1722. He was returned unopposed at the 1727 general election. He made his maiden speech at the committee stage of the Excise Bill on 16 March 1733, declaring that his constituents supported the bill, but on 11 April he seconded a petition from Coventry against the bill presented by William Bromley. At the 1734 general election Neale was defeated by John Bird, a local merchant who stood on the anti-excise platform. Neale recovered his seat in a contest at a by-election on 15 February 1737, but the election was declared void on 22 March 1737. Neale was then returned unopposed at a by-election in 12 April 1737. In 1740, he voted for the place bill. He lost his seat at the 1741 general election and did not stand again.

== Later life and legacy ==
In 1740, Neale replaced the manor house at Cherington with Cherington Park and later he sold the advowson of Allesley to pay the debts arising from his electioneering. He died on 19 December 1746, leaving three daughters. His daughter Frances married Sir John Turner, 3rd Baronet and inherited Cherington Park.

Parliament of Great Britain
Preceded by Sir Thomas Lee, Bt; Sir John Wittewrong, Bt	Member of Parliament for Chipping Wycombe; 1722; With: Sir Thomas Lee, Bt	Succeeded by Charles Egerton; The Earl of Shelburne
Preceded by Sir Adolphus Oughton, Bt; Sir Thomas Samwell, Bt	Member of Parliament for Coventry; 1722 –1734; With: Sir Adolphus Oughton, Bt	Succeeded by Sir Adolphus Oughton, Bt; John Bird
Preceded by Sir Adolphus Oughton, Bt; John Bird	Member of Parliament for Coventry; 1737–1741; With: John Bird 1737; Earl of Euston 1737-1741	Succeeded by William Grove; Earl of Euston
