= List of diplomats of the United Kingdom to the Grand Duchy of Tuscany =

Below is an incomplete list of diplomats from the United Kingdom to the Grand Duchy of Tuscany, specifically Heads of Missions.

== Heads of Missions ==
=== Envoys Extraordinary ===
- Elizabeth I of England sent no envoys to Italy before 1600.
  1600–1601: Lodowick Bryskett Special Ambassador
  1603–1604: Sir Anthony Standen Special Ambassador
  1604: Sir Michael Balfour Special Ambassador
  1608–1609: Sir Stephen Lesieur Special Ambassador

No representation

- 1631–1633: Jerome Weston

No representation

- 1659–1664: Joseph Kent Agent
  1661: George Digby, 2nd Earl of Bristol Special Ambassador
- 1665–1671: Sir John Finch Ambassador
  1670: Viscount Fauconberg Ambassador Extraordinary
  1670: Clement Cottrell Special Ambassador
  1670: James Hamilton
  1672: Sir Bernard Gascoigne in Florence during mission to Emperor of Germany
- 1678: Thomas Plott Agent
- 1681–1689: Sir Thomas Dereham, Bt Minister Resident
- 1689–1690: Sir Lambert Blackwell
- 1690–1697: No diplomatic relations Sir Lambert Blackwell resided at Leghorn as consul
- 1697–1705: Sir Lambert Blackwell
- 1704–1711 Dr Henry Newton
- 1710–1714: Hon. John Molesworth
- 1714–1722: Henry Davenant
- 1722–1724: Hon. John Molesworth Envoy to Savoy but residing in Tuscany 1722–1723 and treated as Plenipotentiary
- 1724–1733: Francis Colman Resident
- 1733–1734: Brinley Skinner (consul) Chargé d'affaires
- 1734–1739: Charles Fane

=== Envoys Extraordinary and Ministers Plenipotentiary ===
- 1740–1786: Sir Horace Mann, 1st Bt Chargé d'affaires 1738–1740; Minister 1740–1765; Envoy Extraordinary 1767–1782; Envoy Extraordinary and Plenipotentiary 1782-1786
- 1786–1787: Sir Horace Mann, 2nd Bt Chargé d'affaires after his uncle's death
- 1787–1788: John Udney (Consul at Leghorn) Chargé d'affaires
  - 1787: William Fawkener (pro tempore)
- 1787–1794: John Hervey, Lord Hervey
- 1794–1814: Hon. William Wyndham
- 1814–1818: John Fane, Lord Burghersh

Also to Parma, Modena and Lucca from 1818

- 1818–1830: John Fane, Lord Burghersh

=== Ministers Resident ===
- 1830–1835: Sir George Seymour
- 1835–1838: Hon. Ralph Abercromby

=== Envoy Extraordinary and Minister Plenipotentiary to the Grand Duke of Tuscany ===
- 1838–1846: Hon. Henry Fox
- 1846–1850: Sir George Hamilton
- 1850–1851: Richard Sheil
- 1851–1852: James Hudson
- 1852–1854: Sir Henry Bulwer
- 1854–1858: Constantine Phipps, 1st Marquess of Normanby
- 1858: Henry Howard (pro tempore)
- 1858: Richard Lyons
- Dec 1858–1859: Peter Campbell Scarlett

In 1858, the Grand Duchy was occupied by Sardinia and abolished in 1859

== See also ==
- Grand Duchy of Tuscany
- History of Tuscany
- List of rulers of Tuscany
- Tuscany
