= Bushy House =

Former royal residence in Teddington in South West London

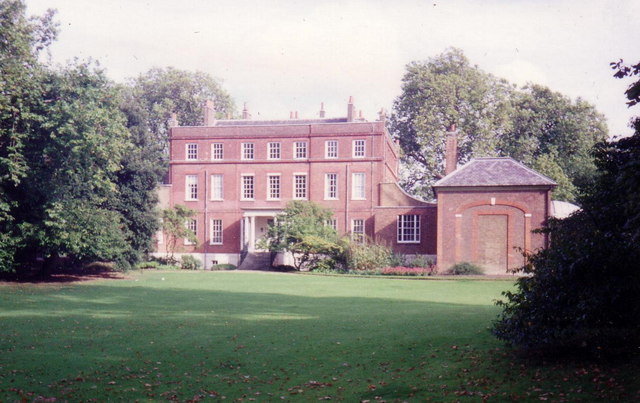
- East side of Bushy House in 1992
- Interactive map of the Bushy House area
- Former names: Upper Lodge

General information
- Type: House
- Architectural style: English classical architecture
- Location: Teddington, London, England
- Coordinates: 51°25′13″N 0°20′21″W
- Construction started: 1663
- Renovated: 1713–1715
- Client: Edward Proger followed by, on rebuild, George Montagu, 1st Earl of Halifax
- Owner: Part of National Physical Laboratory

Design and construction
- Architect: William Samwell

Listed Building – Grade II*
- Official name: Bushy House
- Designated: 2 September 1952
- Reference no.: 1080870

Bushy House is a Grade II* listed former residence of King William IV and Queen Adelaide in Teddington, London, which George Montagu, 1st Earl of Halifax had constructed for his own enjoyment on the site of a previous house Upper Lodge, Bushy Park, between 1714 and 1715. William, a younger son of George III, came to Bushy House in 1797, when he was appointed Ranger of Bushy Park and enjoyed it for the rest of his life.

Since the start of the 20th century, the house is part of the National Physical Laboratory and its upper two storeys overlook adjoining Bushy Park. The house and 30 acres (12 ha) of surrounding Bushy Park land were taken as the site for the National Physical Laboratory (NPL) in 1900 after concerns about flooding of the previously proposed site in the Old Deer Park, Richmond; it opened as part of this important laboratory in 1902.

The ground floor and basement levels of Bushy House were converted to laboratory space and Richard Glazebrook, the first director of NPL, and later directors, used part of the building as private accommodation. Bushy House contains laboratories, two small museums that mainly contain historical scientific equipment, and rooms used for meetings and conferences.

== History ==
Bushy House in its first form was built in 1663 by William Samwell for Edward Proger, at a cost of £4,000 (£710,000 in 2025), as the lodge of the Keeper/Ranger of Bushy Park in what was at the time the North Park part. Proger had been made Ranger of Bushy Park to reward him for his loyalty to King Charles II during his exile.

It was rebuilt by Charles Montagu, 1st Earl of Halifax from 1714 to 1715 after he had bought the three parks from the Duchess of Cleveland and was made ranger. The house and office then passed to his cousin George Montague (1715–1737) and then to George's son George Montague-Dunk (1737–1771). From 1771 to 1792, it was occupied by the grandson of the 1st Earl through his eldest daughter, Lord North, prime minister, who had further homes such as in Epsom and the centre of London or Westminster.

In 1797, after the death of both Lord North and his wife Lady Anne North, King George III appointed his son, William, Duke of Clarence, as ranger of Bushy Park, carrying with it residence at Bushy House. Clarence and his mistress Dorothea Jordan lived there together with their ten children until the couple's relationship came to an end in 1811. Clarence continued living there with the FitzClarence children and later his wife Princess Adelaide after they married in 1818. When at 6am on 26 June 1830 a messenger from London arrived at Bushy House with the news that King George IV was dead and Clarence was now King William IV, he is said to have replied that he had 'always wished to sleep with a queen' and gone back to bed. As William had appointed her ranger in her own right upon his accession, after William's death in 1837, Bushy House became Adelaide's official residence until her death in 1849.

In 1865, Queen Victoria offered Bushy House to the Prince Louis, Duke of Nemours and other members of the exiled French royal family as they tried to restore the House of Bourbon. After his return to France in 1871, he kept control of Bushy House until his death in 1896 in case he was forced to leave France again, and with Nemours not having children as heirs, the house became empty in 1897.

In March 1902, the new National Physical Laboratory was opened at Bushy House by the Prince of Wales (later King George V).

== Gallery ==
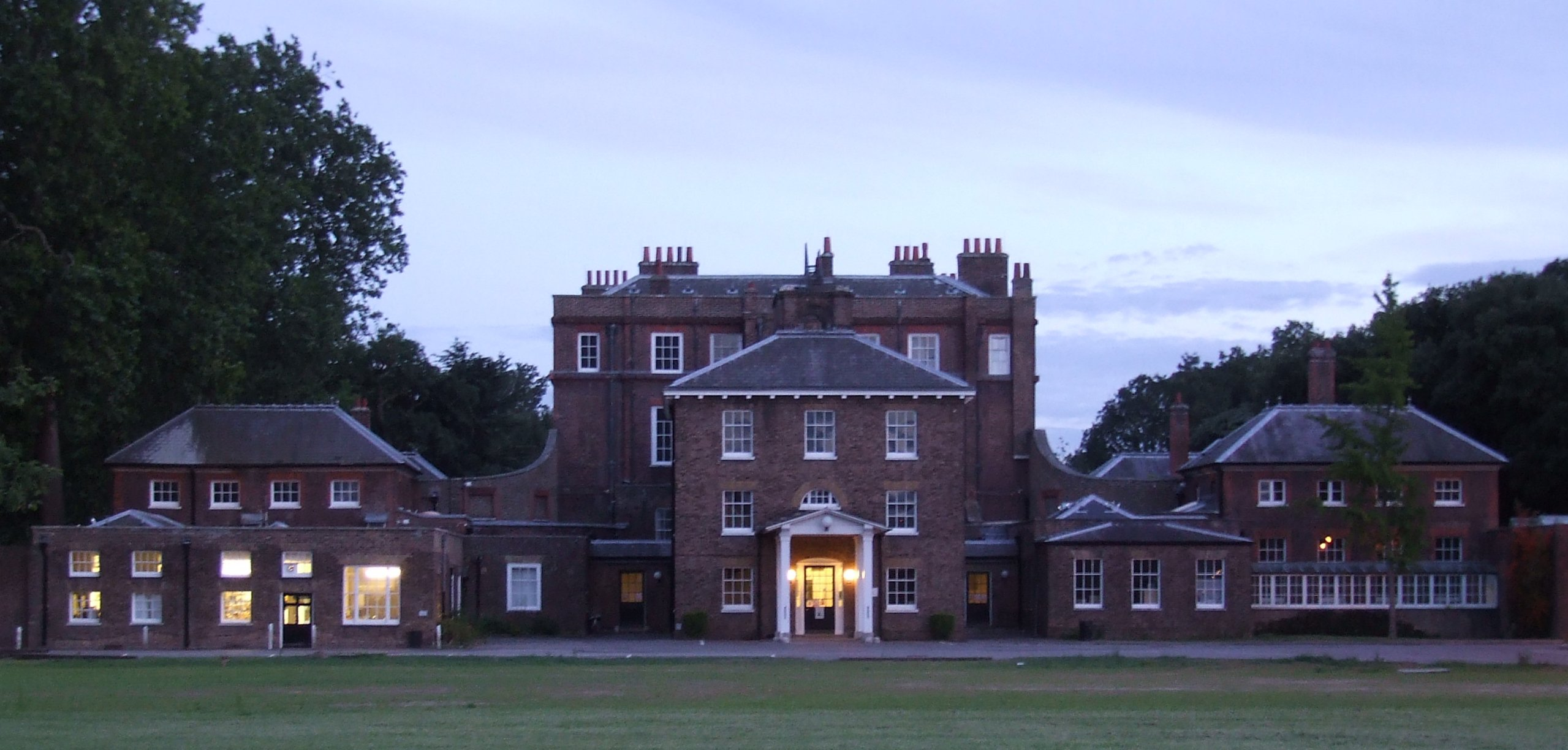
North side of Bushy House in 2007

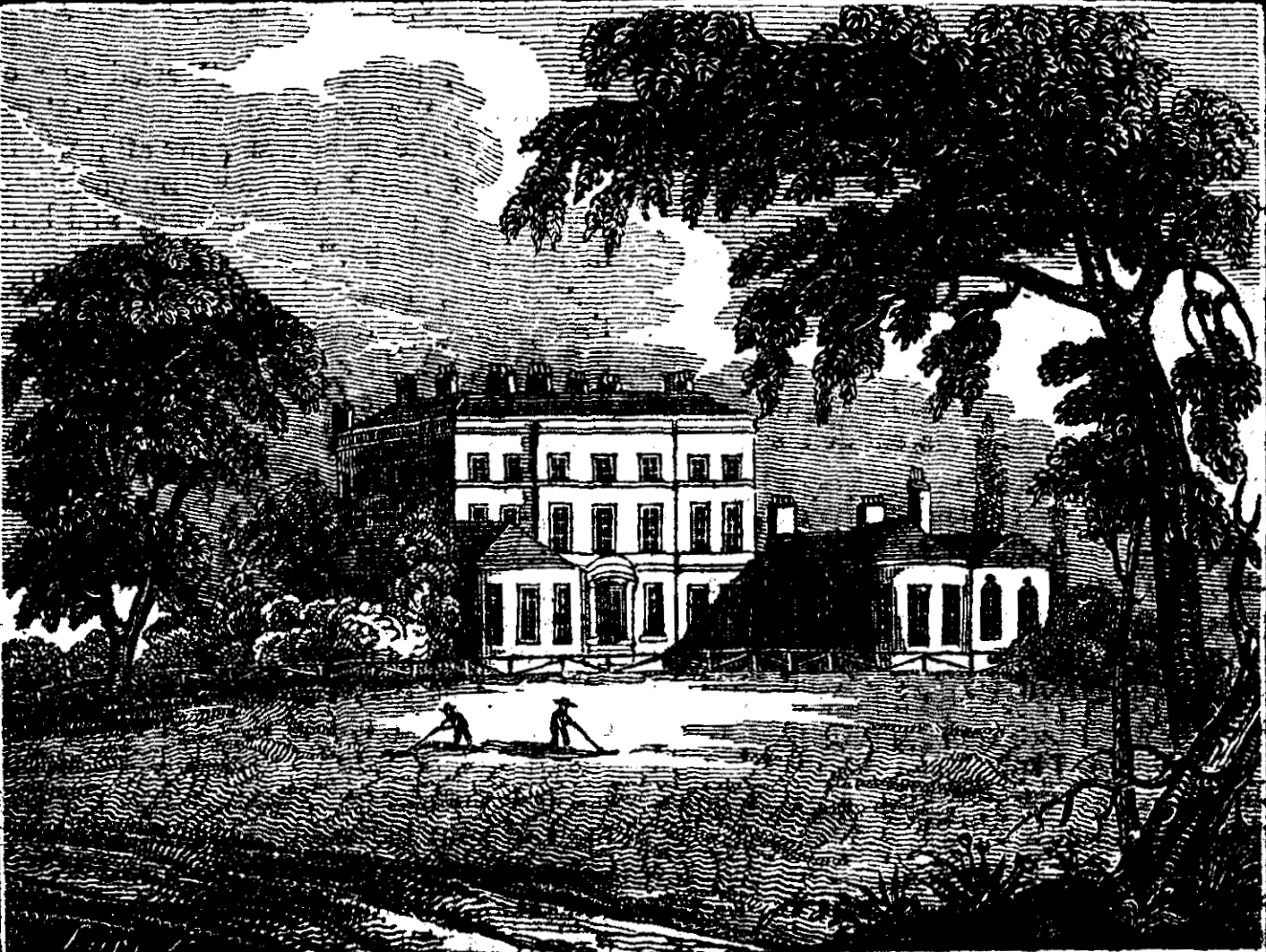
Bushy House from an 1827 book illustration

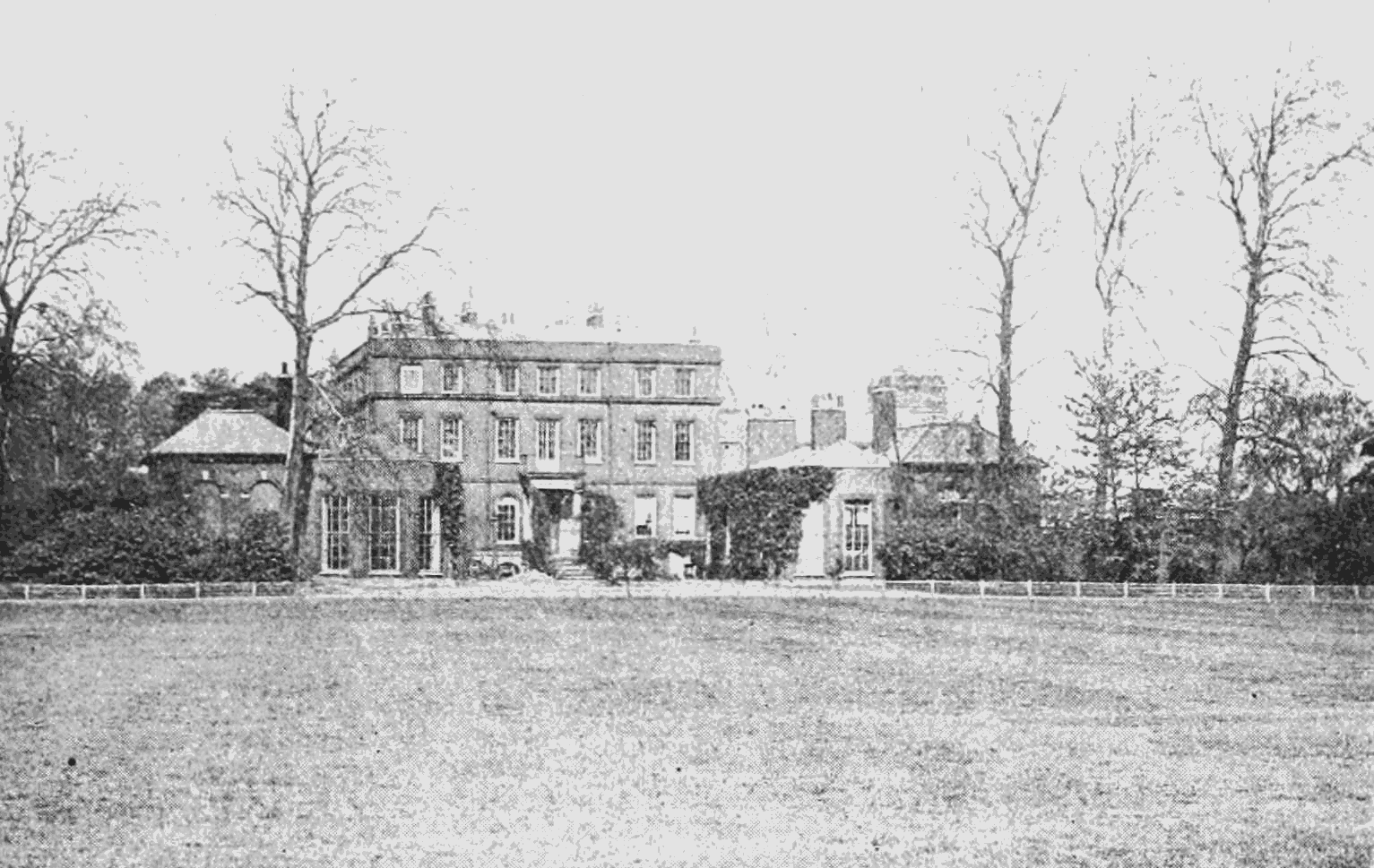
East side of Bushy House in 1901/1902

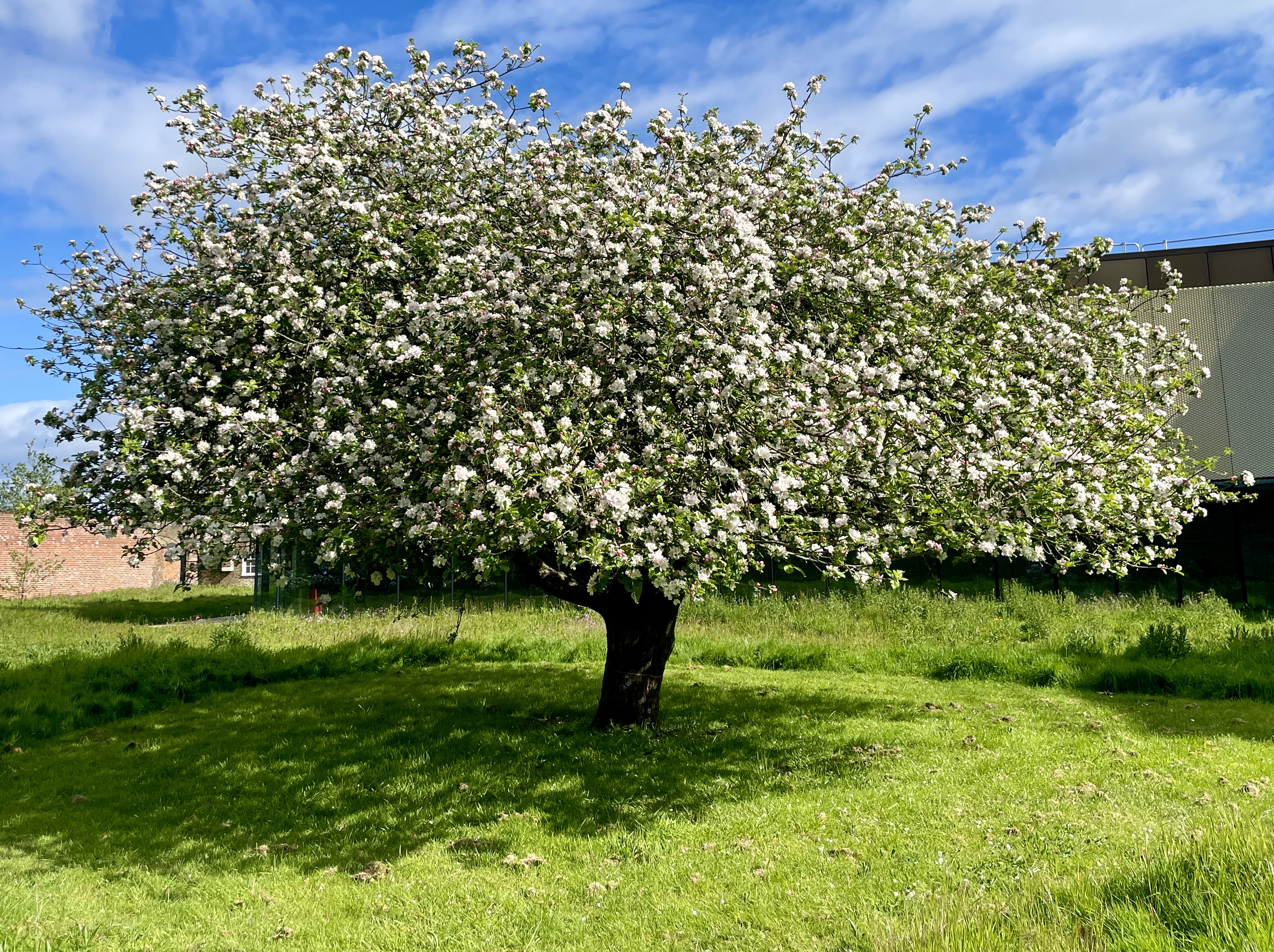
A clone of Isaac Newton's apple tree

== Sources ==
- Eileen Magnello (2000). A Century of Measurement. Canopus. ISBN 0-9537868-1-1.
- The Story of Bushy House
