= Samwel =

Samwel is an alternate form of Samuel used in East Africa and in the Maltese language. Samwel may refer to:

- Samwel Mushai Kimani (born 1989), Kenyan visually impaired middle-distance runner
- Samwel Mohochi (born 1972), Kenyan human rights activist and attorney
- Samwel Mwera (born 1985), Tanzanian middle distance runner
- Samwel Shauri (born 1985), Tanzanian long-distance runner

== See also ==
- Samwell
