= Blackwell baronets =

Extinct baronetcy

Escutcheon of the Blackwell baronets of Sprowston

The Blackwell baronetcy, of Sprowston in the County of Norfolk, was a title in the Baronetage of Great Britain. It was created on 16 July 1718 for Sir Lambert Blackwell, Kt of Sprowston Hall near Norwich. He was a younger son of the Parliamentarian John Blackwell of Mortlake, and a grandson of John Lambert, and a Knight Harbinger and Gentleman of the Privy Chamber to William III by whom he was knighted in 1697. He was a director of the South Sea Company and Member of Parliament for Wilton from 1708 to 1710.

The baronetcy became extinct on the death of his grandson, the 3rd Baronet, in 1801.

== Blackwell baronets, of Sprowston (1718) ==
- Sir Lambert Blackwell, 1st Baronet (died 1727)
- Sir Charles Blackwell, 2nd Baronet (1700–1741)
- Sir Lambert Blackwell, 3rd Baronet (1732–1801)

Baronetage of Great Britain
Preceded by Bridges baronets	Blackwell baronets of Sprowston; 16 July 1718	Succeeded by Oughton baronets
