= Sprowston Community Academy =

Secondary school in Norwich, England

Sprowston Community Academy.

Location
- Cannerby Lane, Sprowston; Norwich, Norfolk, NR7 8NE; England
- Coordinates: 52.6516°N 1.3239°E

Information
- Type: Academy
- Local authority: Norfolk
- Trust: Broad Horizons education
- Department for Education URN: 144359 Tables
- Ofsted: Reports
- Chair of governors
- Head Teacher: Liz Wood
- Gender: Coeducational
- Age: 11 to 18
- Enrolment: 1655
- Colours: Uniform: Maroon and Black PE: Black, Blue and White
- Website: https://sprowstoncommunityacademy.co.uk/

Sprowston Community Academy is a coeducational secondary school located in Sprowston, Norwich, Norfolk, England.

== Description ==
Ofsted described the school as a larger than average-sized secondary school where almost all students are of White British heritage. The proportion of students eligible for the pupil premium (additional government funding for students known to be eligible for free school meals, in the care of the local authority, or from service families) is below the national average. The proportion of disabled students and those who have special educational needs is marginally higher than the national average and the proportion supported at school action plus, or with a statement of special educational needs is also marginally above the national average.

Until the end of the 2011/12 academic year, the school participated in a consortium sixth form arrangement. This has been dismantled. Year 12 and 13 students are taught entirely on site.

== Curriculum ==
Virtually all maintained schools and academies follow the National Curriculum, and are inspected by Ofsted on how well they succeed in delivering a 'broad and balanced curriculum'. Sprowston aims to teach a broad curriculum as long as feasible. This means they choose to teach a three-year Key Stage 3 where students study core subjects.

Spanish is the language taught.

At Key Stage 5 there are five pathways:

- Academic to do the 3 A levels needed for university entrance
- Extended academic with 4 A levels
- Applied Level 3 vocational courses
- Applied Academic which is a combination of A levels and Level 3s
- Employability Pathway for Level 2 vocational courses.
