= Edward Proger =

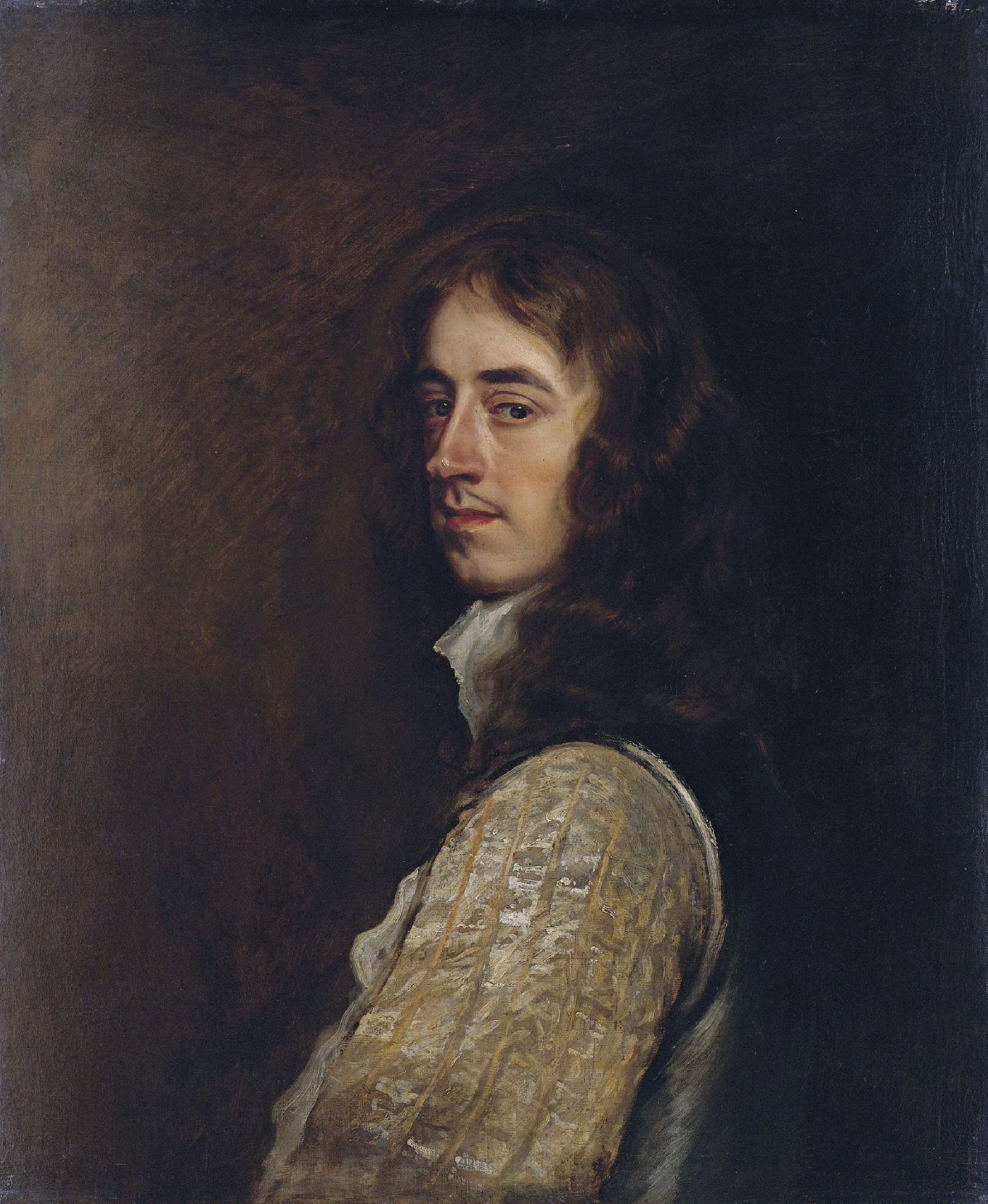
- Painting of Edward Proger by Sir Peter Lely

Member of the Cavalier Parliament for Brecknock/Breconshire
- In office 1662–1679

Edward Proger (16 June 1621 or 1618^{1} – 31 December 1713) was a Member of Parliament for Brecknockshire/Breconshire, Page of Honour to King Charles I, Groom of the Bedchamber for King Charles II and Lord of the manor of West Stow. He was Keeper of the Middle Park and Harewarren for 48 years.

Proger's family lived in a mansion near Abergavenny, Monmouthshire. He was either the second or fourth son of Philip Proger, equerry to James I and had eight children with his wife Elizabeth.

Proger started his career as a page of Charles I and groom to the chamber of his son Charles II, with whom he became good friends. After Charles I's death Proger was with Charles II in Scotland but was sent back to England by the Scots as 'an evil instrument and bad counsellor'. Later he accompanied Charles II to France and also travelled to Spain.

He was granted 2000 acres of land in Virginia in 1650, which were never actually received, and in 1670 was made housekeeper of His Majesty's palace in York. In addition Proger leased the Great Gatehouse at Westminster. Proger was criticised and satirised by figures such as the Duke of Buckingham and Andrew Marvell who suggests that he was a procurer or go-between of the King and his mistresses — he appears in Forever Amber with the same role.

He was elected to parliament as knight of the shire for Breconshire in 1662.

Edward Proger was commanded on 30 December 1663 by the King to build a 'Lodge for Our Service in one of Our Parks at Hampton Court called North Parke' — Bushy Lodge, which was designed by William Samwell, a court architect of Charles II. Bushy Lodge was later expanded to become the present Bushy House. It cost £4000 at the time, a sum for which he was never properly reimbursed. He retired there upon the death of Charles II and in 1702 (aged 81 — 'the oldest servant of the Crown now alive') was given a pension of £200.

Proger was buried under his pew in Hampton church on 4 January 1714. A brass plate covered the grave. Twelve years later the pew was turned into a reading desk and the brass plate was lost until 1831 when the church was demolished. The cause of his death was reported by Peter Le Neve to be 'the anguish of cutting teeth; he having cut four new teeth, and had several ready to cut, which so inflamed his gums he died thereof'. His Brecknock lands were left to his oldest daughter, Philippa, who married Samuel Croxall in 1717.

== Notes ==
1. Welsh Biography Online gives his birth year as 1618

Parliament of England
Preceded by John Jeffreys	Member of Parliament for Breconshire; 1662-1679	Succeeded by Richard Williams
