= Samwell baronets =

Extinct baronetcy in the Baronetage of England

- Escutcheon of the Samwell baronets of Upton
- Creation date: 1675
- Status: extinct
- Extinction date: 1789

The Samwell Baronetcy, of Upton in the County of Northampton, was a title in the Baronetage of England. It was created on 22 December 1675 Thomas Samwell, later Member of Parliament for Northamptonshire and Northampton. He was the great-grandson of Sir William Samwell, Auditor of the Exchequer to Queen Elizabeth I of England. The second Baronet sat as Member of Parliament for Coventry. On the death of the fourth Baronet in 1789, the title became extinct.

== Samwell baronets, of Upton (1675) ==
- Sir Thomas Samwell, 1st Baronet (1654–1694)
- Sir Thomas Samwell, 2nd Baronet (1687–1757)
- Sir Thomas Samwell, 3rd Baronet (1711–1779)
- Sir Wenman Samwell, 4th Baronet (1728–1789)
