= George FitzRoy, Earl of Euston =

English aristocrat and politician

Earl of Euston
- Engraving of George

- Coat of arms: Arms of Tollemache: Argent a fret Sable
- Born: George FitzRoy; 1715; Euston, Suffolk, England
- Died: 1747 (aged 31–32); Bath, Somerset, England
- Spouse: Lady Dorothy Boyle (m. 1741; died 1742)
- Parents: Charles FitzRoy, 2nd Duke of Grafton; Lady Henrietta Somerset

George FitzRoy, Earl of Euston (1715–1747) was an English aristocrat and politician who sat in the House of Commons from 1737 to 1747. He was disowned by his father for his brutal treatment of his wife and tenants.

== Early life and education ==
FitzRoy was born on 24 August 1715, the eldest surviving son of Charles FitzRoy, 2nd Duke of Grafton and Henrietta Somerset, daughter of Charles Somerset, Marquess of Worcester. His father was Lord Chamberlain to George I and George II. His brother was Lord Augustus FitzRoy and Caroline Stanhope, Countess of Harrington. He attended Eton College in 1728.

== Marriage ==
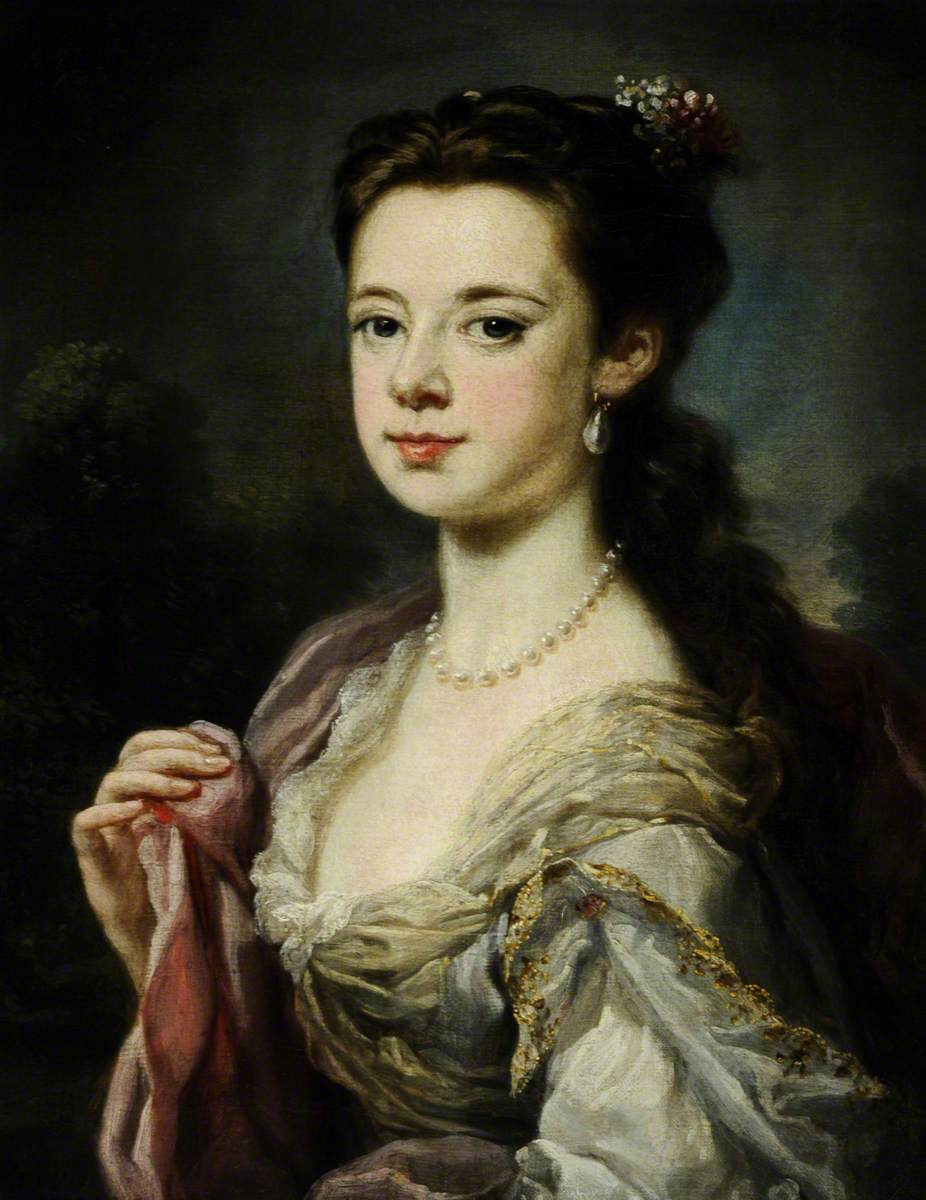
Lady Dorothy Boyle (1724–1742), Countess of Euston

FitzRoy married Lady Dorothy Boyle, the daughter of Richard Boyle, 3rd Earl of Burlington and 4th Earl of Cork and Dorothy Savile, Countess of Burlington and Countess of Cork, in October 1741. In the biography written in the History of the Parliament, Lady Boyle was described as "a girl of the softest temper, vast beauty, birth, and fortune." After she died on 2 May 1742, her mother said that Dorothy was relieved of the "extremest misery", that Lady Boyle's husband exacted on her as what is described as "utmost brutality".

== Parliament ==
FitzRoy stood for Coventry at a by-election on 15 February 1737 which was declared void. He was then returned unopposed as Member of Parliament for Coventry at a by-election on 12 April 1737. He voted in 1740 for the place bill, siding with the Administration, but his activity was otherwise spotty. He was put up for election in 1747 for Coventry, but died before the election.

== Brutality ==
FitzRoy's father, Charles FitzRoy, was particularly dissatisfied with his brutal behavior. For instance, one of George's tenants, a father of six children, killed himself after he had been pressed to pay more than his rent. The tenant stated that he had already paid the full rent owed, but would be willing to pay extra if that was what was needed, to which George responded by threatening to have the man's family removed from his residence. George had duped his father multiple times, in which he declared that he was sorry for his behavior and vowed to change. His words finally met deaf ears when his father disowned him in August 1743. In autumn 1744, FitzRoy eloped to Italy with a Miss Nevill, a celebrated beauty with a fortune to her name, and promised her marriage, which never materialised.

== Death ==
FitzRoy died without issue on 7 July 1747.

Parliament of Great Britain
Preceded by John Neale; John Bird	Member of Parliament for Coventry; 1737 – 1747; With: John Neale 1737-1741; William Grove 1741-1747	Succeeded by William Grove; Viscount Petersham
