= Sir Thomas Samwell, 2nd Baronet =

British sculptor (1687–1757)

Sir Thomas Samwell, 2nd Baronet Samwell (14 April 1687 – 16 November 1757), was a British politician who sat in the House of Commons from 1715 to 1722.

Samwell was the only son of Sir Thomas Samwell, 1st Baronet of Upton, Northamptonshire and his wife Anne Godschalk, daughter of Sir John Godschalk of Atherstone-on-Stour. He succeeded his father in the estates and baronetcy in 1694. He was admitted at Corpus Christi College, Cambridge in 1704, and then undertook a Grand Tour through the Netherlands, Germany, Italy, Switzerland and France.

Samwell was elected Whig Member of Parliament for Coventry at the 1715 general election together with his cousin Sir Adolphus Oughton, 1st Baronet. He did not stand in 1722.

Samwell married twice: firstly to Millicent Fuller, daughter and heiress of Rev. Thomas Fuller on 22 March 1710, and secondly to Mary Ives, the widow of William Ives and daughter of Sir Gilbert Clarke of Chilcote, Derbyshire on 26 January 1721. He had two sons and four daughters with his first wife, and a son and daughter with his second. He was succeeded in the baronetcy by his son Thomas.

Parliament of Great Britain
Preceded by Sir Christopher Hales, Bt; Sir Fulwar Skipwith, Bt	Member of Parliament for Coventry; 1715–1722; With: Sir Adolphus Oughton, Bt	Succeeded by Sir Adolphus Oughton, Bt; John Neale
Baronetage of England
Preceded by Thomas Samwell	Baronet (of Upton); 1694–1757	Succeeded by Thomas Samwell
