= William Samwell (architect) =

English architect

- Born: 1628; Dean's Yard, Westminster, England
- Died: 1676 (aged 47–48)
- Occupation: Architect
- Buildings: Bushy House; Palace House Mansion; Northington Grange; Felbrigg Hall; Eaton Hall
- Projects: Ham House

William Samwell (1628–1676) was an English architect. He was born in Dean's Yard, Westminster, to Anthony Samwell, son of Sir William Samwell, Auditor of the Exchequer to Queen Elizabeth I.

He was one of the gentleman architects who helped define the architectural style that was fashionable after the Restoration. One of his principal buildings was at Grange Park, Northington which he designed and constructed from 1664 to 1670 for Sir Robert Henley. There are no known pictures of the Samwell house. The Grange, Northington, was subsequently remodelled by William Wilkins and is one of the earliest Greek Revival houses in Europe. He also designed and built Bushy House from 1664 to 1665 for Edward Proger.

Having established himself under King Charles II, he was commissioned to build the King's residence in Newmarket from 1668 to 1671. Sometime after 1814, most of the residence was demolished. Today, the remaining southeast block is known as 'The Palace House Mansion'.

In 1672, Samwell and William Bruce enlarged and remodeled Ham House, the residence of John Maitland, 1st Duke of Lauderdale and Elizabeth, 2nd Countess of Dysart.

From 1674 to 1675, Samwell designed the west wing of Felbrigg Hall and the original Eaton Hall, but he did not live to see these last two projects to the end of their construction. Samwell's designs for the west wing are on display inside Felbrigg Hall today, signed and dated 1674.
