= Sir Thomas Samwell, 1st Baronet =

Sir Thomas Samwell, 1st Baronet (c. 1654 – 23 February 1694) was a Member of Parliament for Northamptonshire from 1689 to 1690 and for Northampton from 1690 to 1694. His great-grandfather was Sir William Samwell (1559–1628), Auditor of the Exchequer to Queen Elizabeth I of England.

== Sources ==
- Leigh Rayment's list of baronets

Baronetage of England
New creation	Baronet (of Upton); 1675–1694	Succeeded by Thomas Samwell
