= Sir Lambert Blackwell, 1st Baronet =

English diplomat and Whig politician (died 1727)

Sir Lambert Blackwell, 1st Baronet (died 1727) of Sprowston Hall, Norfolk, was an English diplomat and Whig politician who sat in the House of Commons from 1708 to 1710.

Blackwell was one of the younger of the seventeen children of Captain John Blackwell, of Mortlake, Surrey and his wife Elizabeth Smithsby, daughter of James Smithsby. His father was an active Parliamentary officer from 1650 to 1658, and in 1688 was Governor of Pennsylvania. In 1697, Blackwell was made Knight Harbinger and Gentleman of the Privy Council, being Knighted on 18 May 1697. He married before February 1698 Elizabeth Herne, second daughter of Sir Joseph Herne, of London, Merchant, and his wife Elizabeth Frederick, daughter of Sir John Frederick, Lord Mayor of London from 1661 to 1662.

From 1697 to 1705 Blackwell was British Ambassador to the Grand Duchy of Tuscany and from 1697 to 1698 and from 1702 to 1705 he was British Ambassador to the Republic of Genoa. He was appointed as British Ambassador to the Republic of Venice in 1702.

At the 1708 British general election Blackwell was returned as Whig Member of Parliament for Wilton. He voted for the naturalization of the Palatines in 1709, and for the impeachment of Dr Sacheverell in 1710. He did not stand at the 1710 British general election but was useful to the Whigs as a financier. In the year 1710 to 1711, with a partner, he advanced £60,000 to the crown, and after the succession of George I he helped raise international loans. In 1715 he became a Governor of the South Sea Company in which he invested £13,000. He was created a baronet on 16 July 1718. He bought extensive property in the East of Norfolk and became liable to sequestration under the 1721 South Sea Sufferers’ Act.

Blackwell died on 27 October 1727. His widow died on 12 October 1729.

Parliament of Great Britain
Preceded by William Nicholas; John Gauntlett	Member of Parliament for Wilton; 1708–1710; With: Charles Mompesson	Succeeded by John London; Charles Mompesson
Baronetage of Great Britain
New creation	Baronet (of Sprowston); 1718-1727	Succeeded by Charles Blackwell
