= William Samwell (Auditor of the Exchequer) =

Sir William Samwell (1559–1628) of Northampton and Upton was an Auditor of the Exchequer to Queen Elizabeth I of England. He was knighted at the coronation of King James I of England in 1603.

His nephew was James Harrington (1611–1677), English political philosopher, best known for his controversial work, Oceana.

His grandson was William Samwell (1628–1676), English architect.

The Samwell baronets were created for his great-grandson Sir Thomas Samwell, 1st Baronet.
