= Sir Fulwar Skipwith, 2nd Baronet =

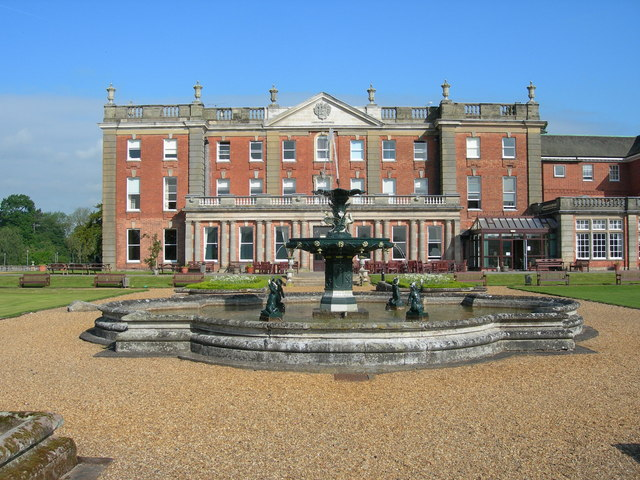
- Newbold Revel Hall

Member of Parliament for Coventry
- In office 1713 - 1715

Personal details
- Born: 1676
- Died: 14 May 1728 (aged 51–52) Bath
- Party: Conservative Party (UK)

Sir Fulwar Skipwith, 2nd Baronet (1676 – 14 May 1728) of Newbold Revel, Stretton-under-Foss, Warwickshire was a Conservative Member of Parliament for Coventry.

He was the only son of Humberston Skipwith, who died before his own father. Fulwar thus succeeded his grandfather to the baronetcy in 1677.

He served as the Member of Parliament for Coventry from 1713 to 1715. In 1716 he commissioned the building of Newbold Revel at Stretton-under-Fosse, Warwickshire.

He died at Bath in 1728. He had married in 1703, Mary, the daughter of Sir Francis Dashwood, 1st Baronet and with her had 3 sons and 2 daughters. He was succeeded by his eldest son, Sir Francis Skipwith, 3rd Baronet.

Baronetage of England
Preceded by Fulwar Skipwith	Baronet (of Newbold Hall); 1677–1728	Succeeded by Francis Skipwith
