= List of people from the London Borough of Croydon =

Among those who were born in the London Borough of Croydon, or have dwelt within the borders of the modern borough are (alphabetical order):

== A ==
- Feroz Abbasi, arrested in Afghanistan in 2001 and detained at Guantanamo Bay; lived in Shirley and attended school in Croydon
- Adegbenga Adejumo (1987–), Croydon born dubstep producer known as Benga
- Allan Ahlberg (1938–2025), children's writer (Penguin)
- Waheed Alli (1964–), born and raised in the north of Croydon; multimillionaire media entrepreneur and politician; co-founder of Planet 24 TV production company; MD at Carlton Television; currently chairman of ASOS.com and Chorion Ltd.; a Labour peer; one of very few openly gay Muslim politicians in the world
- Dame Peggy Ashcroft (1907–1991), actress, born in Croydon and lived in George Street as a child; honoured in the naming of the Ashcroft Theatre, part of the Fairfield Halls; was a school friend of architect Jane Drew
- Lionel Atwill (1885–1946), stage and screen actor, was born in Croydon

== B ==
- Jeannie Baker (1940–), artist, author, designer and animator
- Cicely Mary Barker (1895–1973), illustrator and artist; created the famous Flower Fairies books; born in Croydon and lived locally; studied at the Croydon School of Art
- Jon Benjamin (1964–), Chief Executive of the Board of Deputies of British Jews since 2005; born and grew up in Croydon, and educated at Park Hill Primary School and Dulwich College
- Edward White Benson, Archbishop of Canterbury (1883–1896); lived at Addington Palace; invented Christmas tradition of Festival of Nine Lessons and Carols
- Jeff Beck (1944–2023), guitarist
- Jay Bernard (writer) (1988–), writer, artist, film programmer, and activist, raised in Croydon
- George Berry (1997–), drummer and producer for Bears in Trees
- Keith Berry (1973–), musician and composer
- Frederick Betts (1859–1944), donated Betts Park and built large areas in Croydon and Penge
- Jamal Blackman (1993–), footballer
- Emily Blunt (1983–), actress; she and husband John Krasinski own an apartment in East Croydon
- James Booth (1927–2005), actor (Zulu)
- Dane Bowers (1979–), singer, attended Trinity School
- Stephen Boyden (1925–2025), Australian scientist and author
- Derren Brown, illusionist; born and brought up in Purley
- James Buckley, actor, best known for playing Jay Cartwright in The Inbetweeners
- Raymond Burns (1954–), musician, member of punk rock band the Damned; also known by the name Captain Sensible
- Mark Butcher (1972–), Surrey and England cricketer; born in Croydon, attended Trinity School

== C ==
- Alison Carroll, actress
- Raymond Chandler (1888–1959), screenwriter and author
- Anne Clark (poet) (1960–), poet, songwriter and electronic musician
- Klariza Clayton (1989–), actress
- Martin Clunes (1961–), actor, resident
- Carlton Cole, ex footballer, born in Croydon
- Samuel Coleridge-Taylor (1875–1912), composer; noted for his cantatas including the Song of Hiawatha trilogy; lived at 30 Dagnall Park, Selhurst and worked and died in St Leonards Road, Waddon
- Ronnie Corbett, comic actor, lived for many years in Addington, London
- Frederick George Creed (1871–1957), electrical engineer and inventor of the teleprinter; lived and died at 20 Outram Road, Addiscombe
- Peter Cushing (1913–1994), actor; born in Kenley, lived in Purley
- Kit Connor (2003–), actor

== D ==
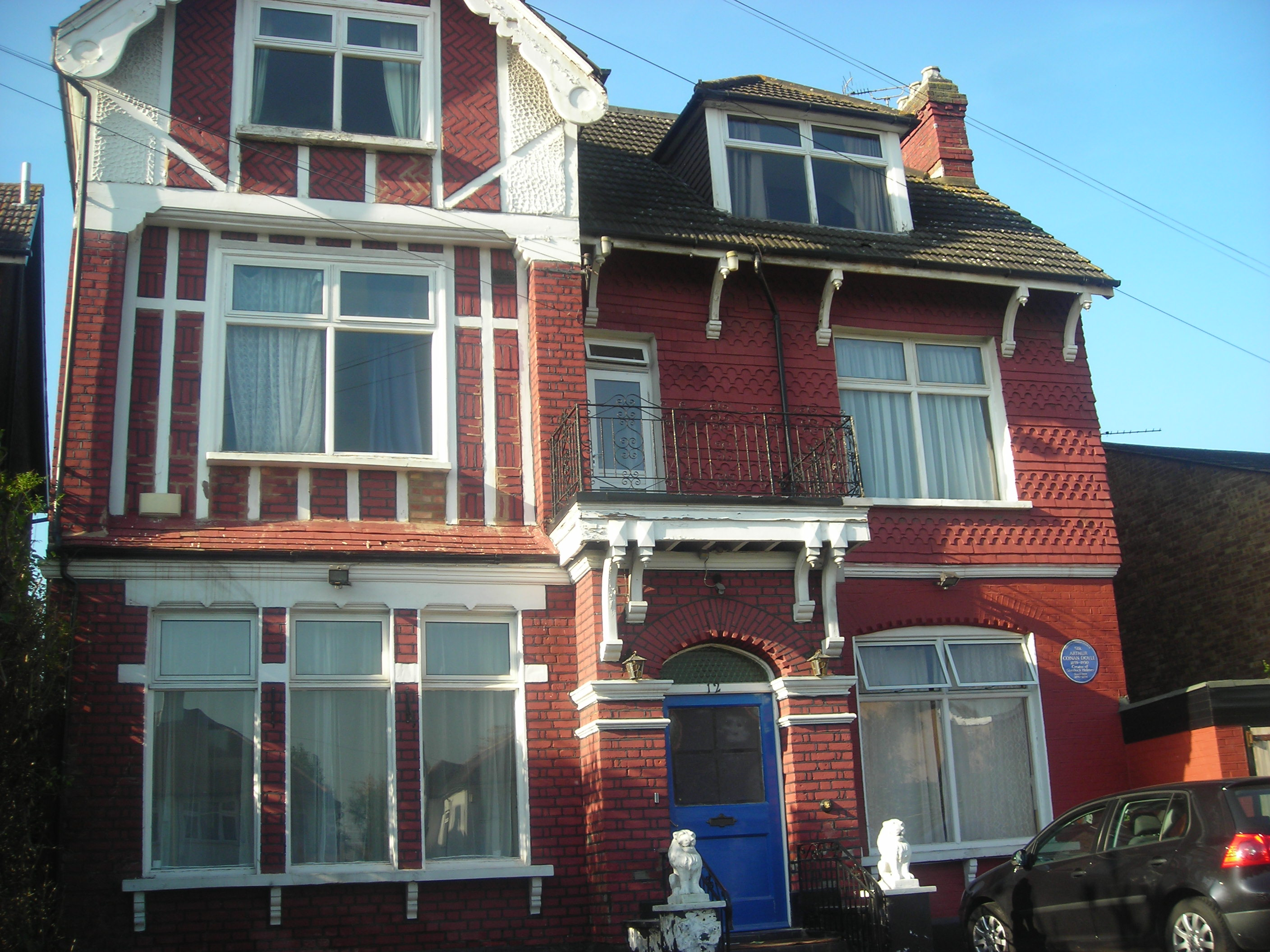
The house of Arthur Conan Doyle in South Norwood

- Tasha Danvers-Smith (1977–), champion hurdler
- Michael Dapaah (1991–), actor and comedian, attended Thomas More Catholic School, Purley
- Bertrand Dawson (1864–1945), physician to the British Royal Family and President of the Royal College of Physicians
- Desmond Dekker (1941–2006), ska musician, lived in Thornton Heath
- R.F. Delderfield (1912–1972), writer and dramatist; lived at 22 Ashburton Avenue, Addiscombe, 1918–1923; his "Avenue" series is based on his life in Addiscombe & Shirley Park; many of his works were adapted for television
- Norman Demuth (1898–1968), composer and musicologist, born at 91 St James' Road.
- Luol Deng (1985–), basketball player for the Chicago Bulls and Great Britain; raised in South Norwood
- Sir Arthur Conan Doyle (1859–1930), author and creator of Sherlock Holmes; lived at 12 Tennison Road, South Norwood 1891–1894
- Jane Drew (1911–1996), architect and town planner; born at 8 Parchmore Road, Thornton Heath; went to Croydon High School and was a school friend of Dame Peggy Ashcroft
- Jacqueline du Pré (1945–1987), British cellist, acknowledged as one of the greatest players of the instrument, but whose career was cut short by multiple sclerosis; lived in Purley and attended Croydon High School
- Des'ree (1968–), award-winning English recording artist.

== E ==
- Havelock Ellis (1859–1939), Victorian sexologist, born in Croydon
- Tracey Emin (1963–), artist
- Carlos Ezquerra (1947–2018), comics artist, co-creator of Judge Dredd

== F ==
- Noel Fielding (1973–), comedian, writer, actor, artist, co-creator of The Mighty Boosh
- Matthew Fisher (1946–), musician, Procol Harum, composer of "Whiter Shade of Pale"
- Kenelm Foss (1885–1963), actor, theatre director, author, screenwriter and film director, born in Croydon
- Alexander Francis (1995–), musician, composer
- Vincent Frank (1985–), musician, Frankmusik
- Donna Fraser (1972–), international athlete
- Ian Frazer, poker player
- Neil Fraser (1955–), dub musician/producer (AKA Mad Professor)
- Jacqueline Froom (1929–2018), poet, lyricist, and teacher
- Charles Burgess Fry (1872–1956), polymath – sportsman, politician, teacher, writer, editor, publisher

== G ==
- Paul Garelli (1924–2006), French Assyriologist
- Iain Gillespie (1997–), bassist and vocalist for Bears in Trees
- Trevor Goddard (1962–2003), actor
- JB Gill (1986–), singer with British boyband JLS, farmer and TV presenter
- Otis Grand (1950–2023), American Blues guitarist, lived in Croydon
- Philip Green (1952–), Croydon born billionaire, owner of the Arcadia Group
- Deryck Guyler (1914–1999), actor
- William Gao (2003–), actor and musician, Wasia Project
- Émilien Gailleton (2003–), French rugby player

== H ==
- Ben Haenow (1985–), winner of the eleventh series of The X Factor
- Will Hay (1888–1949), comic actor; lived at 45 The Chase, Norbury, 1927–1934
- Simon Haynes (1967–), author, was born in Croydon
- Sir Francis Bond Head (1793–1875), soldier, traveller, author and Lieut. Governor of Upper Canada (1836–1838), had his home at Duppas Hill, Croydon
- Chris Heath (1959–), actor, author, comedian
- Roy Hodgson, football manager and former player, born in Croydon, Attended John Ruskin Grammar School.
- Joseph Holbrooke (1822–1876), composer of stage, choral, and orchestral music
- Roy Hudd, comedian, born in Croydon in 1936
- Hannah Schmitz (1985–), Principal Strategy Engineer at Red Bull Racing, attended Croydon High School

== J ==
- Len Jarrett (1921–), former Director of Administration of the World Scout Bureau; former World Organizer of Scoutings's Jamboree-on-the-Air for thirty years; Croydon born
- Nora Johnston (1886–1952), carillon performer and inventor of the mobile carillon
- Finn Jones (1988–), Croydon raised
- Oliver Jones (1986–), Croydon born dubstep producer otherwise known as Skream

== K ==
- Steve Kember (1948–), footballer, born in Croydon
- George Knowland (1922–1945), Victoria Cross recipient
- Krept and Konan, UK rap duo, raised in Gipsy Hill, Lambeth and Thornton Heath, Croydon respectively
- Rachel Keen (1997–), singer-songwriter, known as Raye, raised in Croydon
- Nish Kumar (1985–), comedian, grew up in Bromley and Croydon

== L ==
- Andrew Lawrence
- D. H. Lawrence (1885–1930), author; lived at 12 Colworth Road, Addiscombe, 1908–1912, whilst a teacher at Davidson Road School
- Sir David Lean (1908–1991), film director, born in Croydon
- Iain Lee (1973–), comedian, born in South Croydon
- Mike Leeder (1968–), Hong Kong based Film Producer, Casting Director and sometimes actor, born and raised in Croydon
- Wilfrid Leng (1952–2002), mathematician and writer
- Callum Litchfield (1996–), vocalist, ukulele and keyboard player for Bears in Trees
- E G Handel Lucas (1861–1936), artist, lived in Croydon from 1861 to 1909
- Dani Luna Luna (1999–), Professional Wrestler

== M ==
- Kirsty MacColl (1959–2000), singer and songwriter, born and grew up in Croydon
- Miles Malleson (1888–1969), actor and dramatist, born in Croydon
- Jimi Manuwa (1980–), American-born English mixed martial artist
- Pat Marsh (1934–2017), secretary of the British Ice Hockey Association, lived in Croydon
- Ursula Martinez (1966–), cabaret and burlesque entertainer
- David McAlmont (1967–), British vocalist and songwriter, born in Croydon
- Duke McKenzie (1963–), world champion boxer
- Ralph McTell (1944–), musician, composer of "Streets of London"
- Katie Melua (1984–), singer, songwriter, musician, went to the Brit School for Performing Arts at Selhurst, Croydon
- Graham Moodie (1981–), Olympic hockey player
- Kate Moss (1974–), model
- Malcolm Muggeridge (1903–1990), author and media personality; son of H. T. Muggeridge, a prominent Croydon Labour councillor; taught at John Ruskin Central School in the 1920s

== N ==
- Habib Nasib Nader (1979–), actor, writer
- Kate Nash (1987–), singer-songwriter; attended Brit School, Croydon
- Sarah Niles (1987–) actress, born in Thornton Heath

== O ==
- Lawrence Okoye, athlete, attended Whitgift School
- Tarik O'Regan (1978–), composer, attended Elmhurst and Whitgift Schools, Croydon

== P ==
- Sue Perkins (1969–), comedian, writer, performer
- Nicholas “Nick” Peters (1997–), guitarist for Bears in Trees
- Christopher Pitcher (1973–), cricketer
- Lucy Porter, comedian, raised in Croydon
- Pozer, Rapper
- Simon Prebble (1942–), actor, narrator
- Dickie Pride (1941–1969), rock and roll and jazz singer
- Luke Pritchard, lead singer of The Kooks, attended the Brit School, Croydon
- David Prowse, actor, aka Darth Vader in Star Wars; born in Bristol, lived in Addiscombe, Croydon for over 40 years
- Jason Puncheon (1986–) English professional footballer who plays in midfield for Crystal Palace

== R ==
- Chris Reed (1982–), BBC Radio One dubstep and grime DJ/producer (AKA Plastician)
- Jamie Reid (1947–), situationist, artist, graphic designer
- Robert Reid, rally driver, lives in a flat in South Croydon
- Susanna Reid (1970–), BBC television presenter; born in Croydon, attended Croham Hurst School and Croydon High School
- Nigel Reo-Coker, current English midfielder, playing for Bolton Wanderers and formerly of Wimbledon F.C., West Ham United and Aston Villa; born in Thornton Heath
- Bridget Riley (1931–), painter, one of the foremost proponents of op art; born in Norbury
- Francis Ronalds (1788–1873), inventor, lived in Croydon in the period 1823–33 and manufactured his patented drawing instruments here
- Emily Ronalds (1795–1889), social reformer and sister of Francis Ronalds, established an early preschool in Croydon in 1826
- Martyn Rooney (1987–), international sprinter
- Nadia Rose (1993–), recording artist
- John Ruskin (1819–1900), art critic and social theorist; spent much of childhood in Croydon at his mother's family home and visited often as an adult; his parents are buried in Shirley

== S ==
- Peter Sarstedt (1942–2017), singer, winner of Ivor Novello Award; resident
- Danny Schwarz, model
- Kellie Shirley, EastEnders actress
- Emile Smith Rowe (born 2000), Arsenal footballer, was born in Croydon and spent his early life in Thornton Heath
- Bernard Spear (1919–2003), actor (Yentob)
- William Stanley, (1829–1909), philanthropist, inventor, engineer, author, and artist. Lived most of his life in South Norwood, he designed and built Stanley Halls. South Norwood
- E.L.G. Stones (1914–1987), professor of medieval history at the University of Glasgow from 1956 to 1978
- Dan Stevens, actor
- Stormzy, (1993–), musician, raised in Thornton Heath
- Swift, rapper, part of the group Section Boyz, raised in Croydon

== T ==
- Sam Taylor-Johnson (born 1967), artist and filmmaker, born in Croydon

== V ==
- Jonathan Vaughn (1981–), organist and choir director

== W ==
- Alfred Russel Wallace (1823–1913), naturalist; independently proposed a theory of evolution by natural selection and prompted Charles Darwin to reveal his own unpublished theory sooner than he had intended; lived at 44 St Peter's Road, Croydon
- Aaron Wan-Bissaka, Professional Football player who plays for Premier League club West Ham United born in Croydon
- John Whitgift (ca. 1530–1604), Archbishop of Canterbury; buried in the Parish Church of St John the Baptist; several other Archbishops are buried in the Parish Church or St Mary's in Addington
- Rickie Haywood Williams (1982–), TV and radio presenter currently working for MTV and Kiss 100 London
- Karl "Konan" Wilson, half of the British Rap duo "Krept and Konan", from Thornton Heath
- Amy Winehouse (1983–2011), singer, attended Brit School, Croydon
- Wilfred Wood, served as Bishop of Croydon 1985–2002, the first black Church of England bishop
- Edward Woodward (1930–2009), actor, born in Croydon
- Ian Wright, former Crystal Palace, Arsenal and England football team footballer; lives in Shirley
- Matthew Wright, journalist and television presenter; born and resides in Croydon
- Tom Wright (1957–), architect of Burj Al Arab

== Y ==
- Alfred Gregory Yewen, an Australian agricultural writer, journalist and socialist.
- Lola Young, singer, born in Croydon.

== In fiction ==
- Sarah Jane Smith, the popular fictional companion of the Third and Fourth Doctors in the British science fiction television series Doctor Who
- Jeremy "Jez" Osbourne and Mark Corrigan, the fictional protagonists from the Channel 4 sitcom Peep Show, live in a flat in West Croydon.
- Captain Kevin Darling from the BBC sitcom Blackadder Goes Forth lived in Croydon with his girlfriend Doris. Darling was also a wicket-keeper for the Croydon Gentlemen cricket team.
- Terry and June, the protagonists of the BBC sitcom of the same name, lived in Purley, a suburb of Croydon.
