= Alfred Ronalds =

English author, artisan and Australian pioneer (1802–1860)

Alfred Ronalds (10 July 1802 – 23 April 1860) was an English writer, artisan, and Australian pioneer, best known for his book The Fly-fisher's Entomology.

== Life and family ==
=== Early years ===
He was born at No. 1 Highbury Terrace, Highbury, the eleventh child of wealthy London wholesale cheesemongers Francis Ronalds and Jane née Field. The inventor Sir Francis Ronalds FRS was his oldest brother and mentor. The family later resided at Kelmscott House in Hammersmith, Queen Square in Bloomsbury, and in Croydon.

After a Unitarian schooling, probably at Rev. John Potticary’s school in Blackheath, Ronalds was apprenticed at age 14 to learn the ways of business. He was unsuited to the commercial world, however, and instead spent his time developing his scientific, practical, and artistic skills with Sir Francis.

=== Moving around Britain and to Australia ===
In 1829 he moved to Staffordshire, renting the Lee Grange farm near Lichfield, formerly owned by Francis Perceval Eliot. After his marriage to Margaret Bond of Tixall in 1831, they settled at the property of Lea Fields near Gratwich, where he focused on fly fishing.

The family relocated to Wales in 1843, first living on the shore of Tal-y-llyn Lake, and then in the parish of Llanelwedd, where Margaret died after giving birth to their eighth child. Ronalds decided in 1848 to take the children to the Colony of New South Wales. He established himself initially in Geelong as an engraver, lithographer and printer, and he married Mary Ann Harlow. They had four further children.

After a successful spell prospecting for gold in the Victorian gold rush, the family settled in the new goldfields township of Ballarat in 1852 and established the first nursery in the district on the shore of Lake Wendouree. They supplied some of the initial trees and plants for the Ballarat Botanical Gardens. When he died suddenly his family became quite poor. He was buried in the Ballaarat Old Cemetery and his dilapidated grave was replaced by the Victorian Fly-Fishers' Association in 2008.

=== Australian legacy ===
Ronalds is the progenitor of 52 grandchildren, 294 great-great-grandchildren and many more of subsequent generations, some of whom have made significant contributions to Australia's development in diverse fields. Examples include: engineer Albert Francis Ronalds; artist and horticulturalist Henrietta Maria Gulliver; equestrian Sam Griffiths; politician Andrew Ronalds; and cricketer Janet Ronalds.

== Fly-fishing author ==
Ronalds began fly fishing with his family as a child, learning the craft on rivers near their homes around London. The detailed research for The Fly-fisher's Entomology was conducted on the River Blithe at Lea Fields. The book was produced with the assistance of his brother Sir Francis Ronalds and published by Longman on 11 July 1836.

It was an immediate and enduring success. Ronalds produced a 2nd edition in 1839 and a 3rd in 1844, and Sir Francis, his sister Emily Ronalds and brother-in-law Samuel Carter produced the 4th edition in 1849 when Ronalds migrated to Australia. Copyright and control then passed to Longman for the 5th through 9th editions, and an editor called Piscator was employed who made many changes to the book. Ronalds' nephew John Corrie Carter edited the 10th edition in 1901 and assisted with the 11th edition in 1913. A further edition appeared in 1921. In 2020, the book was described as “the single most influential work ever published” on fly fishing.

Ronalds earned over £600 in revenue from Longman for the 2,000 copies of the first four editions, but he had fallen into debt. He had also become bored with fishing and book-making, and his increasing renown did not sit comfortably with him; he was ready for a new challenge. His wife Margaret's death was a final trigger for his move to Australia.

== Artist and artisan ==
=== Angling applications ===
An early record of Ronalds' artistic talent is the "exquisite delineations" of insects and artificial flies that were the heart of his book. Ronalds engraved the 20 copperplates and managed the printing and colour painting of all the copies of the first three editions.

He also made fishing tackle for sale, including fly rods, his recommended artificial flies, and a novel fly case to store the flies. His eldest child Maria Shanklin later became a professional fly tier in Australia.

=== Australian art pieces ===
Further examples of his engraving and lithography survive that were executed in Geelong. He lithographed the figures in the short booklet A Treatise on Gold Discovery and Gold Washing, compiled from Ure and Hebert (1851) that he produced with James Harrison. He later sold his lithographic presses to Francis Wilson Niven who went on to build up a large printing business. There is evidence that Ronalds taught Niven, a son of Ninian Niven, his early lithographic skills.

Ronalds engraved the Geelong seal after the municipality was incorporated in 1849. Shortly afterwards he designed and made a Separation Medal to commemorate the formation of the new Colony of Victoria. It was the first medal struck in Australasia and a significant number were made for sale. He also advertised as a surveyor and draftsman and made maps for sale.

=== Engineering work ===
In Ballarat, amongst other ventures, he supplied water for the town and assisted in building the hospital.
