= Hugh Carter (painter) =

English painter (1837–1903)

- Born: 4 March 1837
- Died: 27 September 1903 (aged 66)
- Occupation: painter
- Spouse: Maria Concordia Bottomley (m. 1866)

Hugh Carter (4 March 1837 – 27 September 1903) was an English painter, of subject paintings, portraits and landscapes.

== Life ==
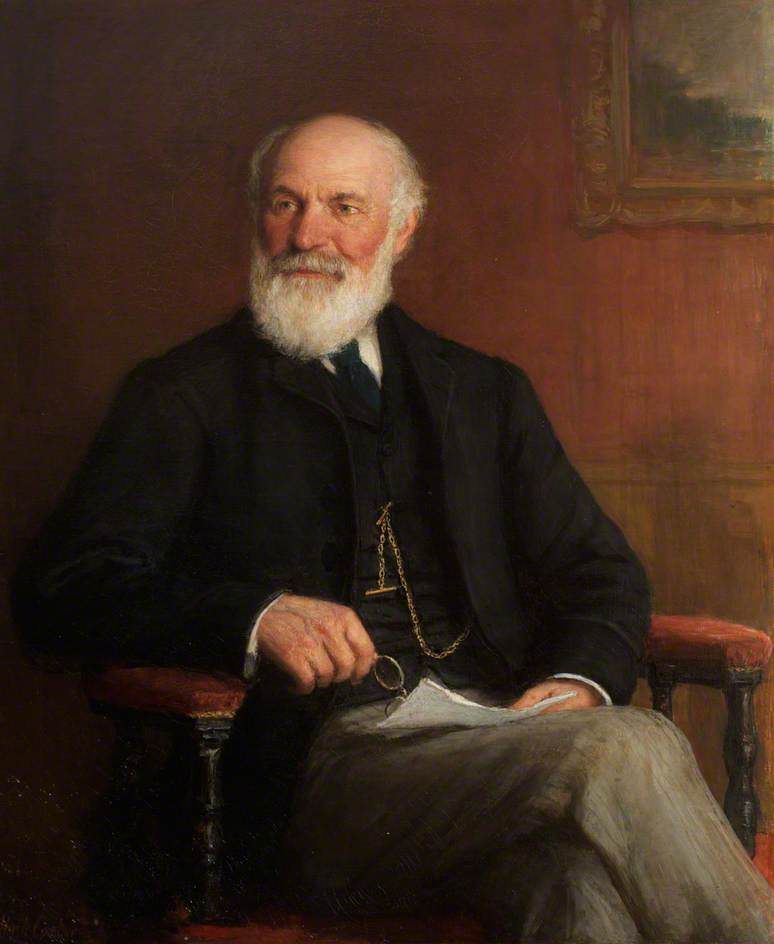
Carter's Samuel Holland, Esq., of Caerdeon (1803–1892), now in the collection of Gwynedd Archives Service

He was born in Birmingham on 4 March 1837, the son of Samuel Carter, a railway solicitor. John Corrie Carter was his younger brother. After the family came to London, he studied for a short time at the Heatherley School of Fine Art and then with John William Bottomley, Alexander Johnson, Francis William Topham, and John Phillip. He also worked at Düsseldorf under Karl Franz Eduard von Gebhardt.

From 1859 to 1902 Carter exhibited twenty-four pictures at the Royal Academy, mostly subject paintings in the domestic genre, with also portraits of Alexander Blair (1873 and 1898), Sir Joshua Staples, F.S.A. (1887), and Mrs. Worsley Taylor (1890). Two of his successful exhibits were Music hath Charms (1872) and Card Players (1873), both representing scenes from Westphalian peasant life. He painted also landscapes in water-colour and pastel.

As a water-colour painter, Carter was a frequent exhibitor at the Royal Institute, of which he became an associate in 1871 and a member in 1875. He was also a member of the Institute of Oil Painters from its start in 1883, and of the New English Art Club. The Tate Gallery acquired his oil painting, The Last Ray (1878); the London Guildhall his Hard Times; and the Victoria and Albert Museum his water-colours Buildings and Gondolas at Venice and Interior of the Capuchin Convent at Albano. His two portraits of his uncle Sir Francis Ronalds went to the National Portrait Gallery, London and the Institution of Electrical Engineers.

Carter died on 27 September 1903, and was buried at Kensal Green. A memorial exhibition of his works was held at Leighton House in October 1904.

== Family ==
Carter married in 1866 Maria Concordia Bottomley, daughter of John William Bottomley. They had six children, who included the painter Frank W. Carter.
