= Francis Rogers (barrister) =

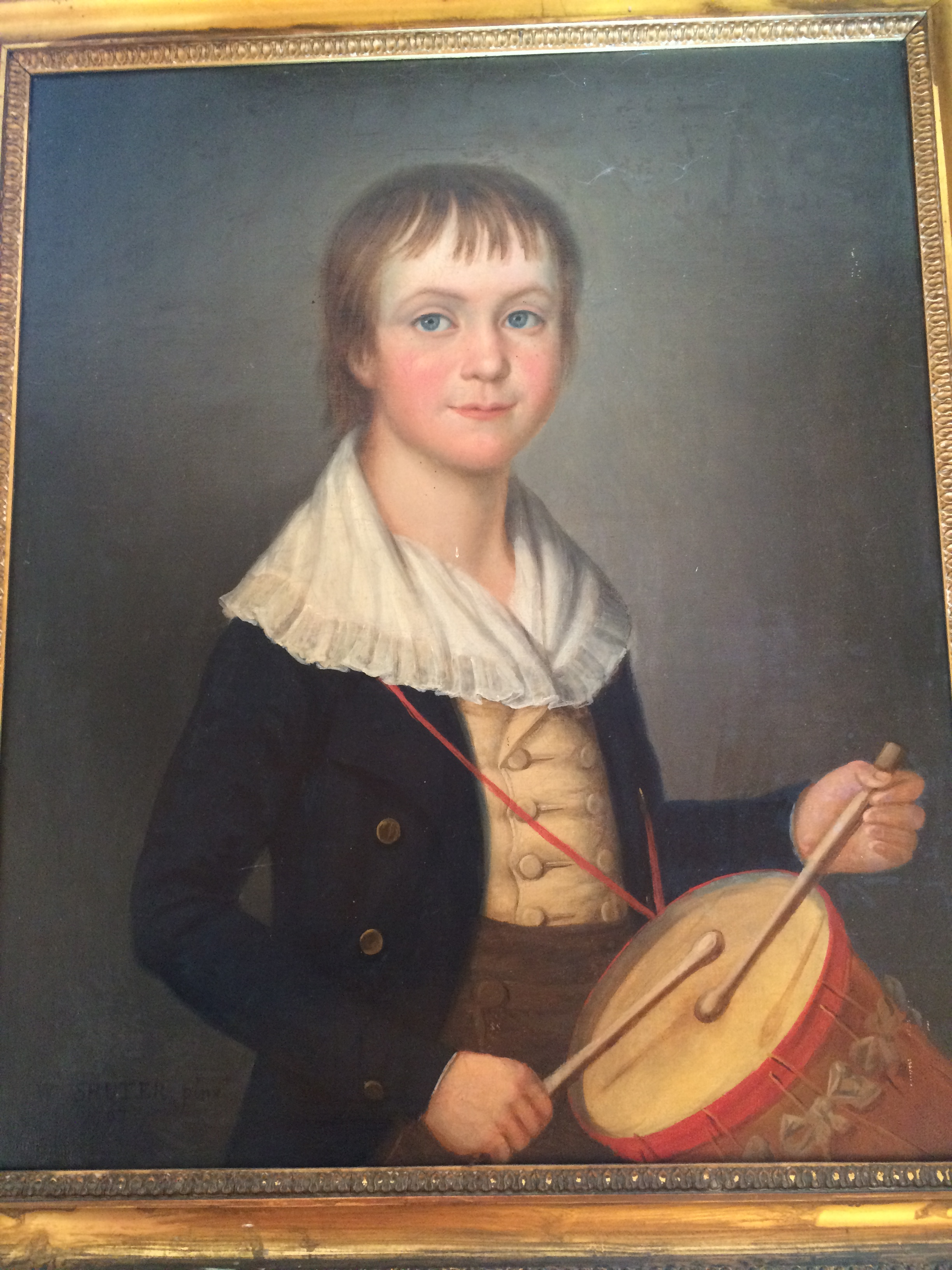
'Little Drummer Boy', Frances Newman-Rogers aged 6 years

Francis James Newman Rogers, KC (1791–1851), was an English barrister, judge and legal author, Deputy Judge Advocate General from 1842 until his death in 1851. Rogers on Elections was the standard reference work for most of the 19th century.

== Life ==
Born in 1791, Rogers was the son of the Rev. James Rogers of Rainscombe, near Marlborough, Wiltshire, by his marriage to Catherine, youngest daughter and co-heir of Francis Newman, Esquire, of Cadbury House, Somerset. His grandfather was the Rev. Benjamin Rogers of Rainscombe, where the family had been established for several generations. Francis Newman was lord of the manor of North Cadbury. Rogers was educated at Eton College, matriculated from Oriel College, Oxford, on 5 May 1808, graduated BA on 8 February 1812, and MA on 15 June 1815.

He was called to the bar at Lincoln's Inn on 21 May 1816, and to the Inner Temple ad eundem in 1820. He went the western circuit and practised in the common-law courts and as a special pleader. On 24 February 1837 he was created a King's Counsel, and soon after was elected a bencher of the Inner Temple. From 1835 to his death he was recorder of Exeter, and from 1842 Deputy Judge Advocate General.

He married, on 29 June 1822, Julia Eleanora, third daughter of William Walter Yea, Esq., and sister of Sir William Walter Yea, Baronet, of Pyrland Hall, Somerset, by whom he had three sons and two daughters. His eldest son, Francis Newman Rogers (d. 1859), and his third son, Walter Lacy Rogers (d. 1885), were called to the bar. His second son was Edward Henry Rogers, and his daughters were Eleanora Amelia and Gertrude Jane.

Rogers died at the age of 59 at 1 Upper Wimpole Street, London, on 19 July 1851, and was buried in the Temple Church on 25 July.

Mr Justice Coleridge said of Rogers after his death

We went to school together, we went to college together, we joined the Western Circuit nearly at the same time ... whilst in the discharge of his duty he sought to be kind and courteous to everyone he had to deal with ... in all the graver and more important duties he was found to be industrious, inflexible, and impartial ... at the same time tempering the administration of justice with a proper exercise of mercy.

== Arms ==
Rogers's coat of arms quartered the three black stags on silver of Rogers with the crowned golden portcullis on a red field of Newman. The family motto is Nil conscire sibi, meaning "To have a guilt-free conscience".

== Publications ==
Rogers was the author of:

- Remarks on the question of the right to publish Proceedings on the Coroner's Inquisition (1824)
- The Law and Practice of Elections, with Analytical Tables and a Copious Index, J. & W. T. Clarke, law booksellers, 1820, 344 pp. (dedicated to Sir W. D. Best); 2nd ed. publ. J. and W. T. Clarke, 1830, 615 pp.; 3rd ed. as altered by the Reform Acts, 1835; 6th ed. V. & R. Stevens and G. S. Norton, 1841; 9th edit. with F. S. P. Wolferstan, 1859; 10th edit. by F. S. P. Wolferstan, 1865; 11th edit. (with the New Reform Act), 1868; 13th edit. by J. C. Carter, 1880; 14th edit. by J. C. Carter, 1885; 15th edit. by M. Powell, J. C. Carter, and J. S. Sandars, 1886 and 1890; 16th edit. by S. H. Day, 1892 & Stevens, 1897; 18th ed. titled On elections: Municipal and other elections and petitions, Stevens & Sons Ltd., 1906.
- Rogers on elections, election committees, and registration, 10th ed. by Stevens and Sons, 1865 (585 pp.)
- Parliamentary Reform Act, 2 Will. IV, c. 45, with Notes containing a Complete Digest of Election Law as altered by that Statute, J. and W. T. Clarke, 1832, 144 pp.
- A Practical Arrangement of Ecclesiastical Law, 1840; 2nd edit. 1849.
- The Marriage Question: an Attempt to discover the True Scripture Argument in the Question of Marriage with a Wife's Sister (34 pp.), London: Rivingtons, 1855.
