= John Corrie Carter =

19th-20th century English barrister, High Sheriff, author and sportsman

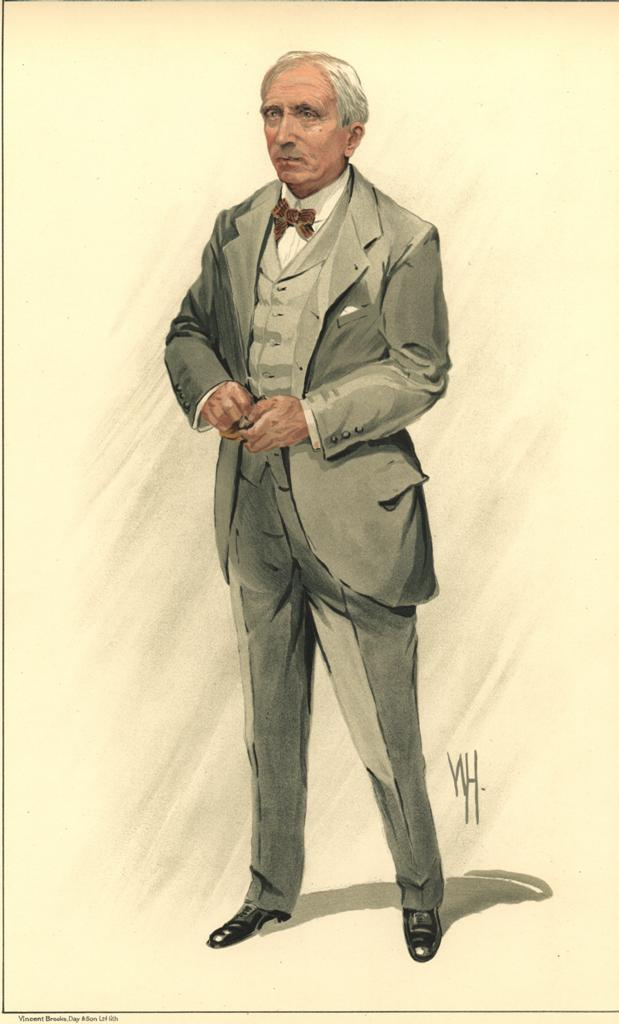
- John Corrie Carter, depicted in Vanity Fair (1912)
- Born: 29 December 1839 Birmingham, England
- Died: 5 June 1927 (aged 87) Rhayader, Wales
- Occupation: Barrister

John Corrie Carter (29 December 1839 – 5 June 1927) was an English barrister, High Sheriff, author and sportsman.

== Life and family ==
Born at Islington Row, Birmingham, Corrie Carter was the third son of Maria (youngest sister of inventor Sir Francis Ronalds) and solicitor Samuel Carter. The painter Hugh Carter was his brother. He married Amy Josephine Lonsdale, the granddaughter of Bishop John Lonsdale, on 31 October 1876 at Lichfield Cathedral. The couple had no children. Around 1880 he and Amy purchased an estate at Rhayader, in Radnorshire, Wales, and he died and was buried there approaching 50 years later.

== Legal career ==
Corrie Carter graduated with a Bachelor of Laws from Trinity College, University of Cambridge. Admitted to the Inner Temple, he was called to the Bar in 1865 and went on the Midland Circuit. In private practice he was counsel for the Birmingham Mint.

From 1876, for a decade, he served as a Revising Barrister in numerous districts around the Midlands. In the period 1881–1912 he was Recorder of Stamford, and in 1895–1913 he was also chairman of the Radnorshire Court of Quarter Sessions. He served as High Sheriff for Radnorshire in 1893. He was in addition a director of the Midland Railway in 1896–1910.

== Author ==
Corrie Carter was responsible for three editions of Rogers on Elections: the 13th (1880), 14th (1885) and part 2 of the 15th (1886). It was a standard legal text first penned by Francis Rogers. He also wrote a book on the Corrupt and Illegal Practices Prevention Act, 1883 as a supplement to Rogers’ 13th edition. In 1901 he edited the 10th edition of his uncle Alfred Ronalds’ book The Fly-fisher's Entomology.

== Sportsman ==
Corrie Carter was coxswain for the four- and eight-oared boats of the Cambridge First Trinity Boat Club at the Henley Royal Regatta in 1861. His crew won the four chief races: the Grand Challenge Cup, the Stewards' Challenge Cup, the Ladies' Challenge Plate and the Visitors' Challenge Cup. The feat was commemorated in 1912 by a caricature of Corrie Carter and a biographical article in Vanity Fair.

He was also a good shot and golfer as well as an avid fly fisherman.
