= The Fly-fisher's Entomology =

1836 book by Alfred Ronalds

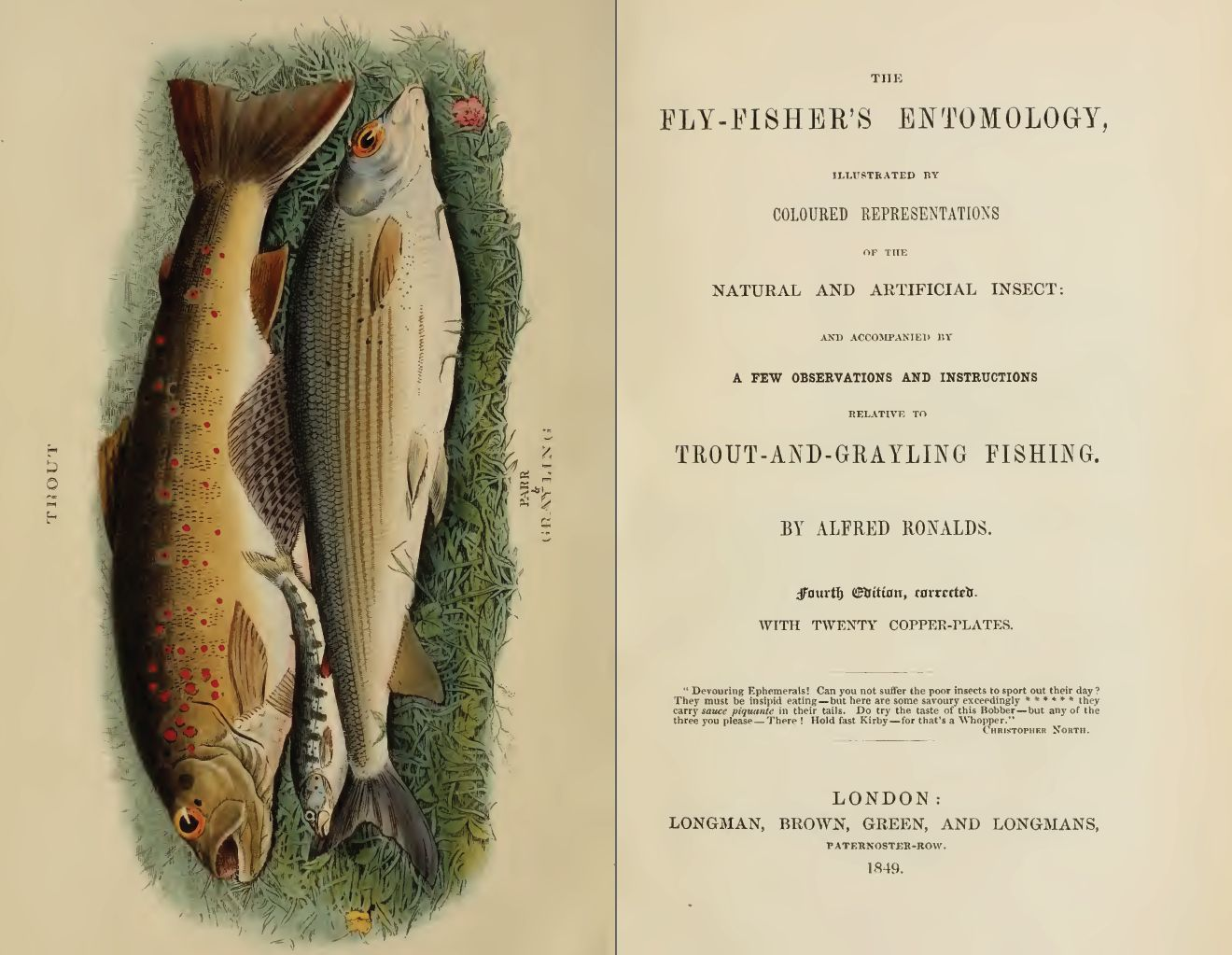
- Frontispiece and title page (1849 edition)
- Author: Alfred Ronalds
- Illustrator: Alfred Ronalds
- Subject: Fly fishing
- Publisher: Longman, Rees, Orme, Brown, Green, and Longman, London
- Publication date: 1836
- Pages: 115

The Fly-Fisher's Entomology, Illustrated by Coloured Representations of the Natural and Artificial Insect and Accompanied by a Few Observations and Instructions Relative to Trout-and-Grayling Fishing, first published in 1836 by Alfred Ronalds (1802–1860), was the first comprehensive work related to the entomology associated with fly fishing. Although the work was Ronalds' only book, it was published in 11 editions between 1836 and 1913 and has been extensively reprinted in the last 100 years.

== Synopsis ==
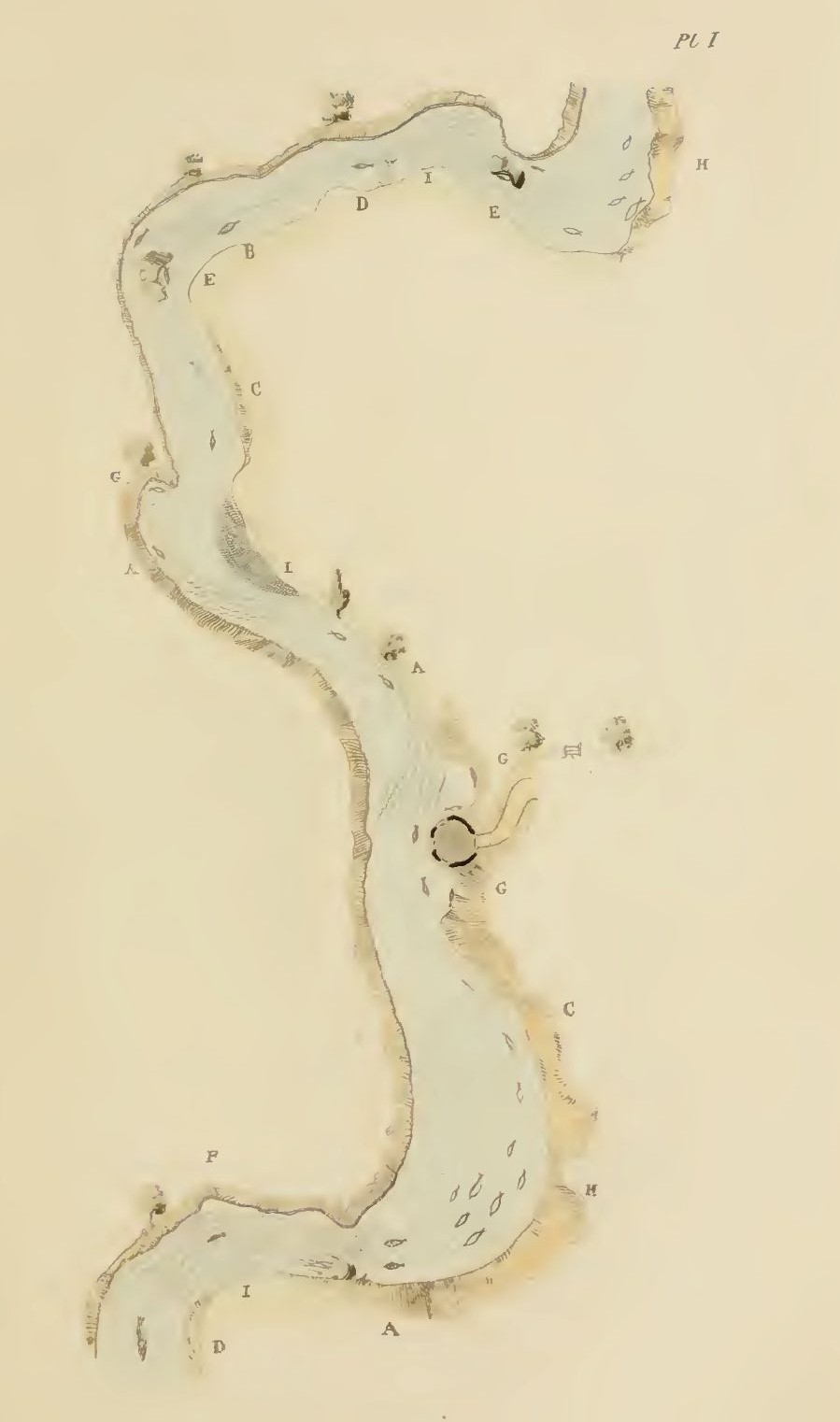
Plate I – Haunts of the Trout

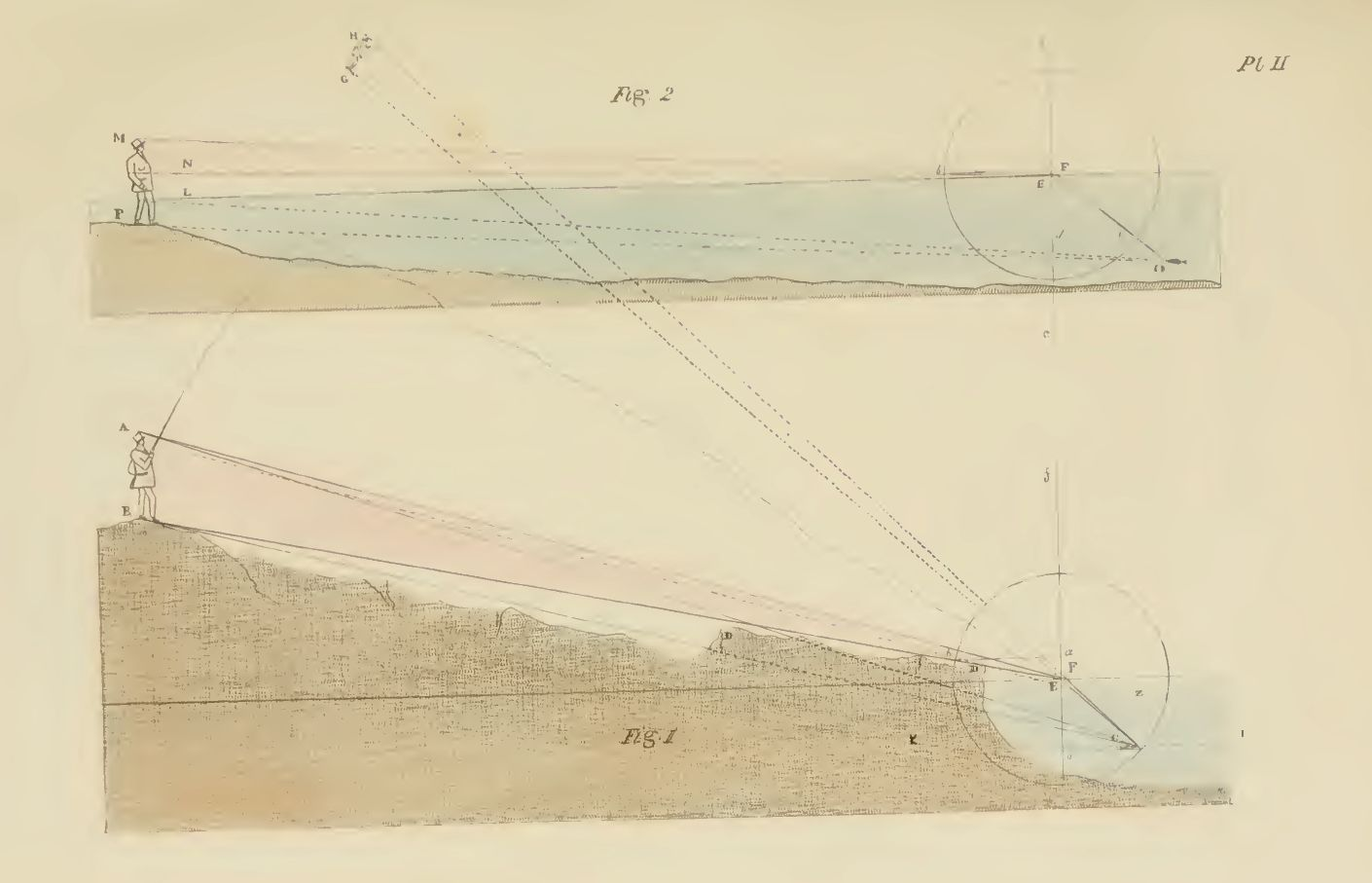
Plate II – Optical diagrams

The Fly-fisher's Entomology is the archetype fly-fishing how-to book. Most fly-fishing historians credit Ronalds with setting a literature standard in 1836 that is still followed today. Describing methods, techniques and, most importantly, artificial flies, in a meaningful way for the angler and illustrating them in colour is a method of presentation that can be seen in most fly-fishing literature today. As the name implies, this book is mostly about the aquatic insects—mayflies, caddisflies and stoneflies—that trout and grayling feed on and their counterpart artificial imitations. Less than half the book (chapters I–III) is devoted to observations of trout, their behaviour, and the methods and techniques used to catch them. Most of this information, although enhanced by Ronalds' experiences and observations, was merely an enhancement of Charles Bowlker's Art of Angling (first published in 1774 but still in print in 1836).

Ronalds introduced several new ideas, however, in Chapter I. His experiments and observations led him to describe and illustrate the trout's Window of vision, a concept an understanding of which is still essential today. Vincent Marinaro, in his classic work In the Ring of the Rise (1976), credits Ronalds with discovering and documenting this window and includes a reproduction of plate II – Optical diagrams in his book. Ronalds’ physicist brother Sir Francis Ronalds quantified the phenomenon for Alfred using his knowledge of optics. In the sub-chapter "Haunts", through discussion and illustration (plate I), Alfred Ronalds introduces the idea known today as reading the water to help the angler identify the most likely locations in the stream to find trout.

The real meat of Ronalds' book was Chapter IV: Of a Selection of Insects, and Their Imitations, Used in Fly Fishing. Here, for the first time, the author discussed specific artificial fly imitations by name, associated with the corresponding natural insect. Organized by their month of appearance, Ronalds was the first author to begin the standardization of angler names for artificial flies. Prior to The Fly-fisher's Entomology, anglers had been given suggestions for artificial flies to be used on a particular river or at a particular time of the year, but those suggestions were never matched to specific natural insects the angler might encounter on the water. The following is a typical discussion:

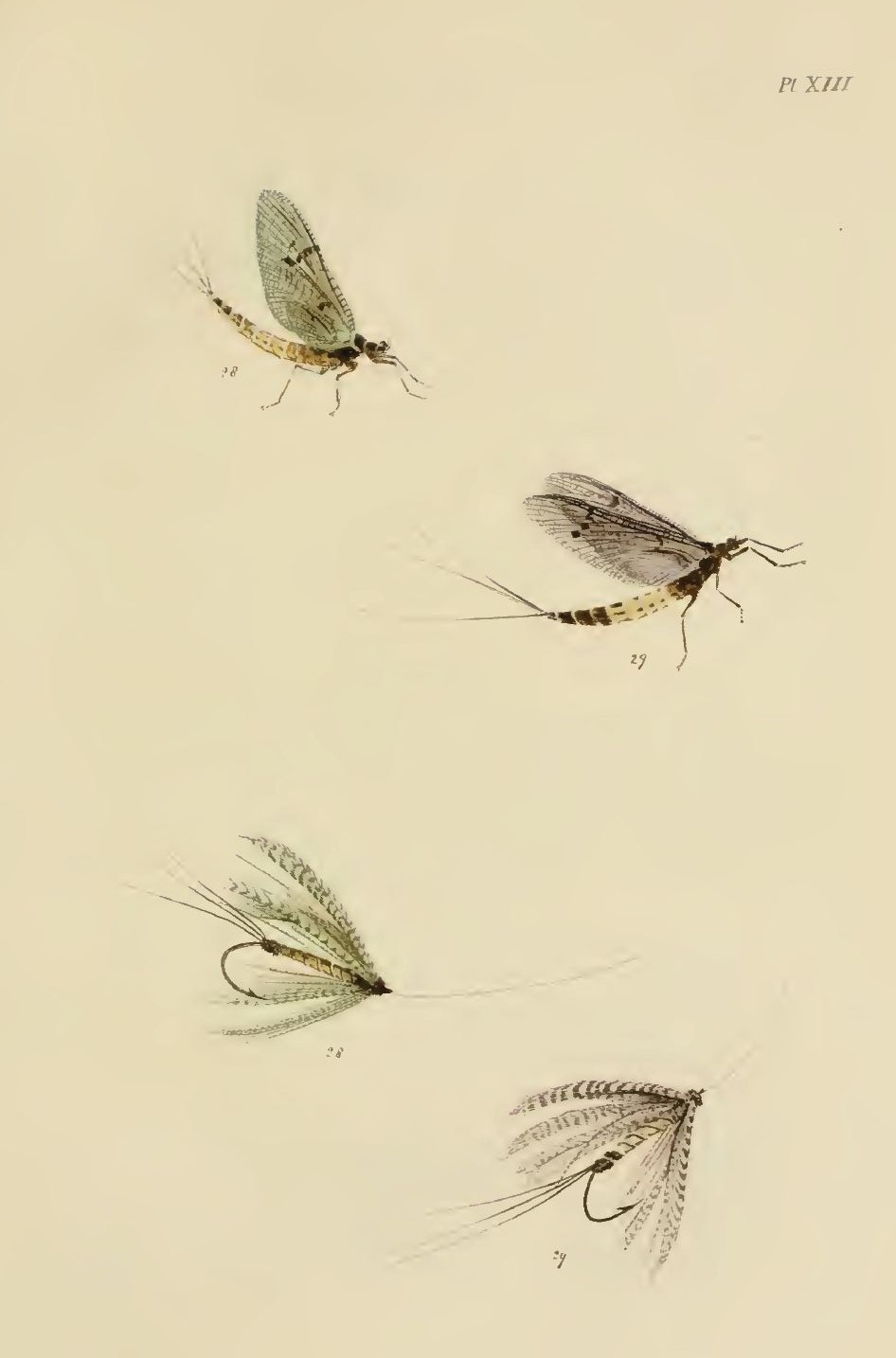
Plate XIII – Green Drake and Grey Drake

No. 28. Green Drake [Plate XIII]. This fly, proceeding from a water nympha, lives three or four days as shown; then the female changes to the Grey Drake (No. 29.), and the male to the Black Drake (see p. 89.). The Green Drake cannot be said to be in season quite three weeks on an average. Its season depends greatly upon the state of the weather; and it will be found earlier upon the slowly running parts of the stream (such as mill dams) than on the rapid places.

- Imitation
  - Body. The middle part is of pale straw coloured floss silk, ribbed with silver twist. The extremities are of a brown peacock's herl, tied with light brown silk thread.
  - Tail. Three rabbit's whiskers.
  - Wings and Legs. Made buzz from a mottled feather of the mallard, stained olive. (See Dyes, Chap. II. p. 35. article 4.) To make it with wings in their state of rest, part of a feather similarly stained must be used, and a pale brown Bittern's hackle, or in case of need, a partridge feather must be wrapped round the same body under the wings.

— The Fly-fisher’s Entomology, 1849

== Author ==
Alfred Ronalds was born in Highbury, London in 1802, the 11th of 12 children. His father was a successful merchant and his eldest brother, Sir Francis Ronalds, became famous for pioneering the electric telegraph. In 1817 at the age of 15, Ronalds took an apprenticeship as an engraver, lithographer and copper-plate printer. In 1830 he moved to Tixall, Staffordshire. He married his first wife, Margaret Bond, a local girl, in 1831.

In Staffordshire, Ronalds took up the sport of fly fishing, learning the craft on the rivers Trent, Blythe and Dove. On the River Blythe, near what is today Creswell Green, Ronalds constructed a bankside fishing hut designed primarily as an observatory of trout behaviour in the river. From this hut, and elsewhere on his home rivers, Ronalds conducted experiments and formulated the ideas that eventually were published in The Fly-fisher's Entomology. He combined his knowledge of fly fishing with his skill as an engraver and printer, to lavish his work with 20 colour plates.

In 1844, Ronalds moved his family to Dolgelly North Wales and in 1846 he moved to Brecon in South Wales, then to Cwmback, Llanalwedd, to become a full-time tackle maker and fly tier. In 1847, his first wife Margaret died during childbirth. In 1848 with six of his children, Ronalds moved to Melbourne, Australia and set up an engraving business. The gold rushes of the 1850 eventually found Ronalds settled in Ballarat, where he died suddenly of a stroke in 1860. He never returned to England.

== Contents ==
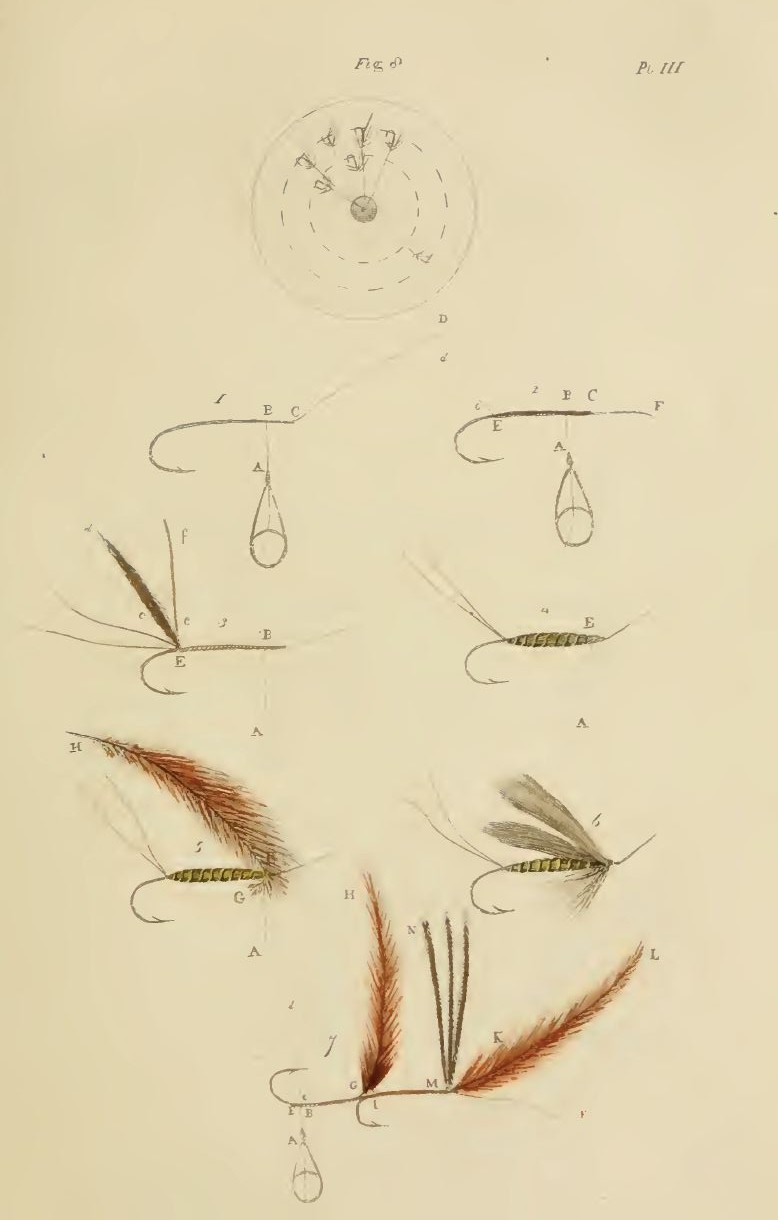
Plate III – Fly-making Figures

- Chapter 1 – Observations On The Trout And Grayling.
  - Of The Trout. Measurement, Weight, Fins, Colour, Condition, Haunts, &c. Description of a Fishing-hut or Observatory, The Trout's sense of Hearing, Sight, Taste and Smell. Manner of feeding, &c. Form, Weight, Fins, &c. of the Grayling, Colour, Condition, Haunts, Food
- Chapter II – Of Tackle
  - Rod, Line, Reel. Foot Line, Hook, Dubbing Bag, General Directions for making a Fly and a Palmer. Dyes for Feathers. Fly Books and Boxes, Crele [sic], Landing Net
- Chapter III – Manner of Fishing for Trout and Grayling
  - Preparation of the Rod and Line. Art of Throwing, Choice of Weather. State of the Water. Choice of a Fly. Appearance of Life to be given to the Fly. Buzz flies sometimes preferred. Rising short, &c. Sudden cessation of Rises, &c. Places to be whipped, &c Throwing to a Trout just risen. Striking. Killing, Landing. Differences between Trout and Grayling fishing. Manner of presenting the Fly. Landing, &c
- Chapter IV – Of a Selection of Insects, and Their Imitations, Used In Fly Fishing.
  - Flies, &c. used in March, Flies, &c. for April, For May, For June, For July, For August, For September, Palmers for the Season
- List of Plates
  - Trout and Grayling – Frontispiece.
  - I. Haunts of the Trout, &c.
  - II. Optical Diagrams
  - III. Fly-making Figures
  - IV. Red Fly – Cock Wing – Red Spinner
  - V. Water Cricket – Great Dark Drone – Cow Dung Fly
  - VI. Peacock Fly – March Brown – Great Red Spinner
  - VII. Golden Dun Midge – Sand Fly – Stone Fly
  - VIII. Gravel Bed – Grannom – Yellow Dun
  - IX. Iron Blue Dun – Jenny Spinner – Hawthorn Fly
  - X. Little Yellow May Dun – Black Gnat – Downhill Fly
  - XI. Turkey Brown – Little Dark Spinner – Yellow Sally
  - XII. Sky Blue – Fern Fly – Aldar Fly
  - XIII. Green Drake – Grey Drake
  - XIV. Marlow Buzz – Dark Mackerel
  - XV. Pale Evening Dun – July Dun. – Gold Eyed Gauze Wing
  - XVI. WrenTail – Red Ant. – Silver horns
  - XVII. August Dun – Orange Fly – Cinnamon Fly
  - XVIII. Blue Bottle – Whirling Blue Dun – Little Pale Blue Dun – Willow Fly
  - XIX. Red Palmer – Brown Palmer – Black Palmer

Contents, from 1st Edition, 1836

== Reviews ==
- John Waller Hills in A History of Fly Fishing for Trout (1921) gave Ronalds' only work high praise:

Ten years later [1836] Ronalds produced his wonderful book. This gave coloured plates of natural and artificial flies, the naturals all classified and named. Few books have been more widely read, or had more influence. It went through eleven editions, the last, a sumptuous one, coming out as late as 1913. It started a school of writers and a school of thought. Though nearly one hundred years old it remains the only book of its class, and the world is still waiting for the benefactor who will bring it up to date. It is the textbook and in a sense the creator of the race of angler-naturalists.

— John Waller Hills, 1921

- Ernest Schwiebert, in his 1973 seminal work Nymphs, explains Ronalds thus:

Ronalds is one of the major milestones in the entire literature of fly-fishing, and with his Entomology the scientific method has reached angling in full flower. Ronalds was completely original in its content and research, setting the yardstick for all subsequent discussion and illustration of aquatic fly hatches. The graphic work is beautifully executed, and the copper plates remain equal to most modern lithography. Ronalds is the prototypical mixture of angler and biologist that would appear again later in the nineteenth century, and continues to play a major role in contemporary thought.

— Ernest Schwiebert, Nymphs 1973

- Arnold Gingrich, in his The Fishing in Print (1974), credits Ronalds:

It's impossible to overstress the importance of Ronalds. Certainly he is the most significant figure in fly fishing after Cotton whom he followed by a hundred and sixty years. And while The Complete Angler was of course unique in it impact on the literary world, and will undoubtedly always remain so, it is safe to say that no single book ever had the revolutionary effect on the angling world—that is, the actual practice of angling, as opposed to the recording of it annals—of The Fly-fisher's Entomology in 1836.

— Arnold Gingrich, The Fishing In Print, 1974

- Andrew Herd, noted fly-fishing historian, characterized The Fly-fisher's Entomology thus:

Time and hindsight can be harsh judges of flyfishing literature. Only a few works in any era survive beyond it to become cherished milestones of the sport's development. Sometimes they are valued for breakthroughs in knowledge and practice, sometimes for superb writing, presentation and appearance, and very occasionally for both. High on this most elite list is Alfred Ronalds' The Fly-Fisher's Entomology. Although this classic study was published in England in 1836, its importance reaches far beyond that place and era. Ronalds was decades ahead of his time, establishing paths that many of the greatest 20th century anglers would follow.

— Andrew Herd, Fly Fishing History

- William C. Black, in Gentlemen Preferred Dry Flies (2010) noted:

Comparing the natural to its imitation seems an obvious approach, but no one before, or for many years thereafter, did the job effectively. In truth, first Bowlker and then Ronalds developed the style of modern treatments replete today with excellent color photographs, charts, graphs and the like.

— William C. Black, Gentlemen Preferred Dry Flies, 2010

== Editions ==
From: Westwood, Thomas; Satchell, Thomas (1883). Bibliotheca Piscatoria. London: W. Satchell.

- First Edition, London, Longmans, 1836. 115 pages
- Second Edition, With twenty copper plates. London, Longmans, 1839 115 pages
- Third edition, London, Longmans, 1844. 115 pages
- Fourth edition, London, Longmans, 1849. 115 pages
- Fifth edition, revised, with additions by Piscator. London, Longmans, 1856. 132 pages
- Sixth edition. London, Longmans. 1862. 132 pages
- Seventh edition. London, Longmans. 1868. 132 pages
- Eighth edition. London, Longmans, 1877. 132 pages

From Antiquarian Book Exchange

- Ninth edition. London, Longmans, 1883. 132 pages
- Tenth edition. London, Longmans, 1901. 132 pages, edited by J. C. Carter
- 1913 limited edition (250), Liverpool, Henry Young and Sons. 1913
- 1921 edition, London, Herbert Jenkins. 152 pages, edited by H.T.Sheringham
- 1993 Fly-fisher's Classic Library, limited reprint of 5th edition (1000), 1993
- 1997 reprint, Easton Press, 1997
- 1836 edition reprint, Pranava Books, 2007 print on demand
- Pre-1923 reproduction, Bibliolife, 2009, ISBN 978-1-117-31988-9

== See also ==
- Bibliography of fly fishing
