= Perspective machine =

Optical instrument used by artists

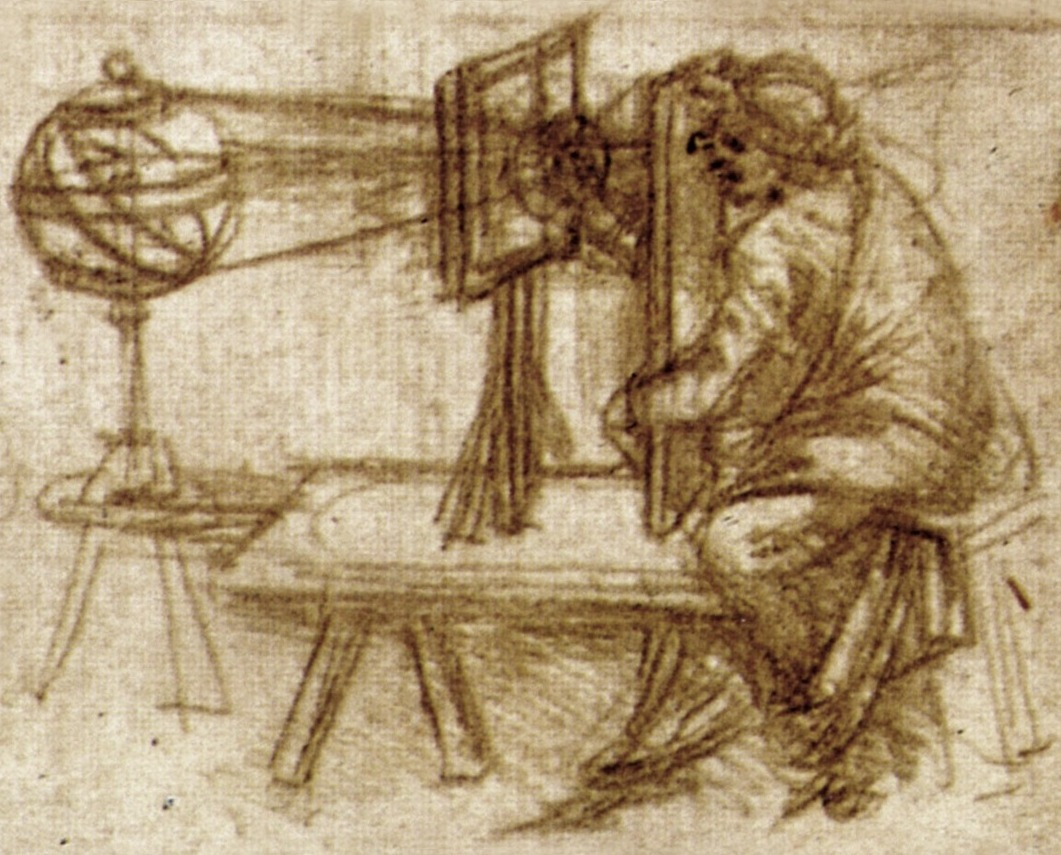
Illustration of a Perspectograph, a type of perspective machine

A perspective machine is an optical instrument designed to help artists create perspective drawings. The earliest machines were built centuries ago when the theory of perspective was being worked out, and modern versions are still in use.

== Timeline ==
- 1510: Leonardo da Vinci's Draftsman drawing an armillary sphere shows an early form of perspective machine in use.
- 1525: Albrecht Dürer, in his illustration Man drawing a lute, shows an artist using a perspective machine to create a drawing. The machine consists of a wooden frame with a taut string passing through it to represent the viewer's line of sight. Dürer built his second model of such a machine in the same year.
- c.1765: Scottish engineer James Watt designs a machine based on an easel, with a pantograph mechanism allowing the artist to trace an object using a sight arm and transfer the movement of the sight to a pen drawing on paper. Watt stated that his machine was based on an invention by a Mr Hurst, who lived in India.
- 1763: Philosopher Thomas Reid uses a machine to investigate his theory of perception.
- 1825: English inventor Francis Ronalds patents two perspective tracing machines. One generated an accurate drawing of an object or scene in nature and the other created a perspective view of an object from drawings of the plan and elevations. Ronalds manufactured the machines and sold several hundreds of them.
