= Kelmscott House =

Georgian brick mansion in London, England

Coordinates: 51.4905°N 0.2354°W

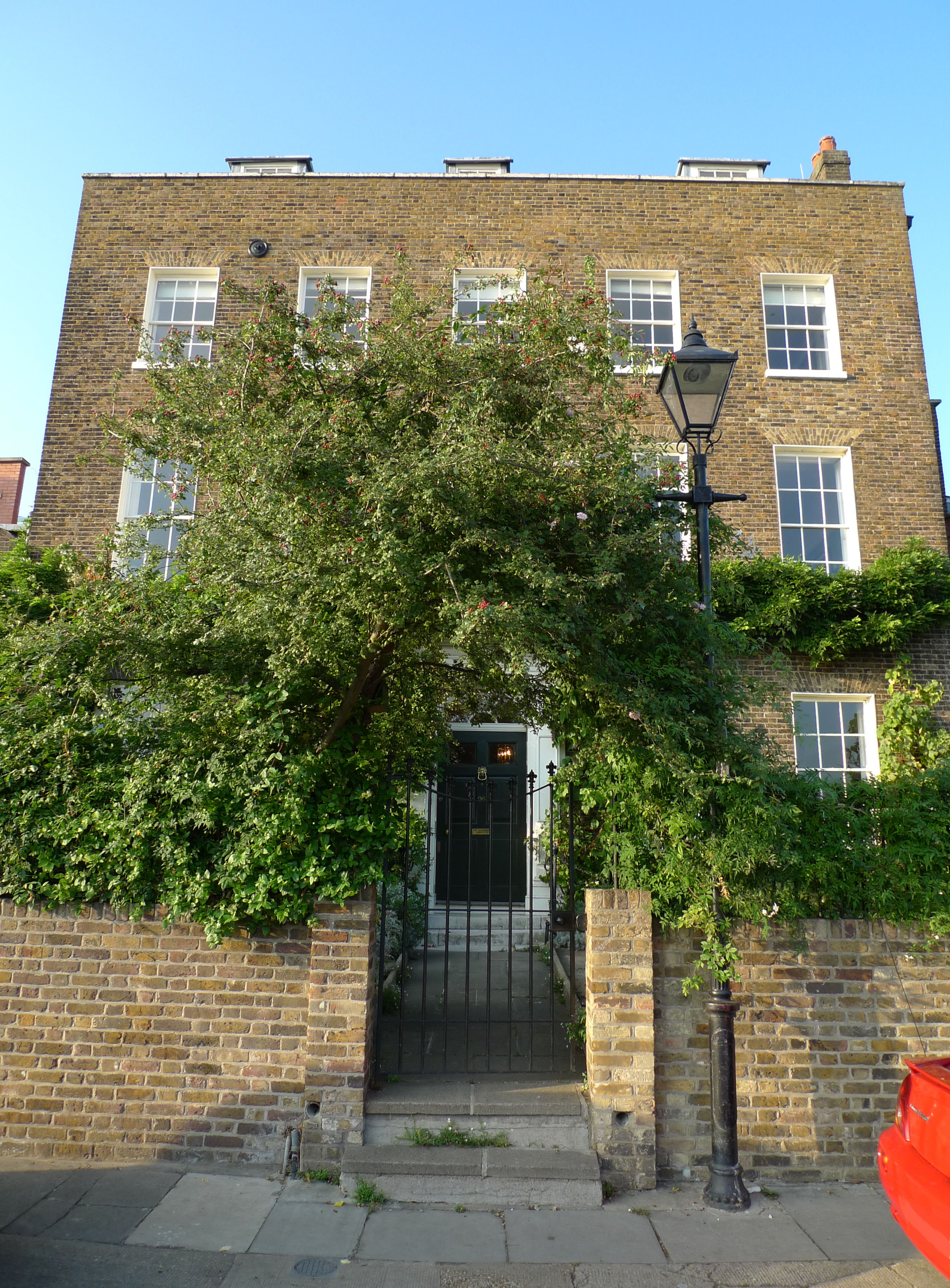

General information
- Location: London, England, 26, Upper Mall
- Completed: c. 1785
- Owner: Jane Ronalds; George MacDonald (1867-1877); William Morris (1878-1896)

Technical details
- Floor count: 3

Listed Building – Grade II*
- Official name: Kelmscott House
- Designated: 17 June 1954
- Reference no.: 1193040

Kelmscott House is Grade II* listed Georgian brick mansion at 26 Upper Mall in Hammersmith, overlooking the River Thames. Built in about 1785, it was the London home of English textile designer, artist, writer and socialist William Morris from 1878 to 1896.

Originally called The Retreat, Morris renamed it after the Oxfordshire village of Kelmscott, where he had leased Kelmscott Manor as a country retreat since June 1871.

Nearby, Morris began his "adventure in printing" with his private press, the Kelmscott Press, which he started at 16 Upper Mall in 1891.

== Previous owners ==
The property was once owned by Sir Francis Ronalds' family. In 1816, he built the first electric telegraph in its garden. From 1867, then called The Retreat, it was the family home of poet, minister and novelist George MacDonald who wrote two of his most popular children's books, At the Back of the North Wind (1871) and The Princess and the Goblin (1873), there.

It was the London home of English textile designer, artist, writer and socialist William Morris from October 1878 until his death in October 1896.

== Today ==
The building is a private house, though the basement and coach house entrance serve as headquarters of the William Morris Society, whose premises are open to the public Thursday to Sunday.

The William Morris Society temporarily re-formed the local branch of the Socialist League (UK, 1885) to participate in the 2011 London anti-cuts protest. The banner was paraded again on 20 October 2012.
