= Wilfrid Leng =

Mathematician (1952–2002)

Wilfrid Spencer Leng (21 October 1952 – 30 August 2002) was a mathematician and writer who contributed his 'Theory of Everything' to the search for a Unified Field Theory that would combine Albert Einstein's General Theory of Relativity with quantum mechanics.

Born in Croydon in 1952, Leng was educated at Dulwich College in London and then at Magdalene College, Cambridge. He taught for a time at Millfield School. In 1983, he published his collection of verse, Sing England to Italy. These poems were described by the Poet Laureate Sir John Betjeman as "deeply felt and... very beautiful". Leng taught creative writing, and as a further education teacher, he delivered such diverse subjects as philosophy, cosmology, science and history, and gave the annual Einstein Lectures at Croydon College. However, his major preoccupation was with mathematical physics, and after delivering papers to a number of major mathematical conferences during the 1990s, in 1999 Leng produced his The Theory-of-Everything Equation, in which "all things originate in and constantly communicate with a 'multiverse' that produces 'points' which turn, thus producing the cosmos".

Leng died in London in 2002, after contracting an illness while attending a mathematical conference in Beijing.
