= Lewknor (surname) =

Lewknor is a surname and may refer to:

- Christopher Lewknor (1598–1653), English politician
- Edward Lewknor (died 1556) (c.1517–1556), English politician
- Edward Lewknor (died 1605) (1542–1605), English politician
- Lewes Lewknor (c.1560–1627), English courtier and Member of Parliament
- Richard Lewknor (c.1589–1635), English politician
- Richard Lewknor (died 1616) (bapt. 1541 – 1616), English politician
- Thomas Lewknor (MP for Midhurst) (c.1538–1596), English politician.
- Thomas Lewknor (MP for Ripon) (by 1529 – will proven 1571), English politician

== See also ==
- Lewkenor
