= Warwick (constituency) =

Former British parliamentary constituency (1295–1885)

- Former borough constituency for the House of Commons
- County: Warwickshire
- Major settlements: Warwick

1295–1885
- Seats: Two
- Replaced by: Warwick & Leamington

Warwick was a parliamentary borough consisting of the town of Warwick, within the larger Warwickshire constituency of England. It returned two Members of Parliament (MPs) to the House of Commons of England from 1295 to 1707, to the House of Commons of Great Britain from 1707 to 1800, and then to the House of Commons of the Parliament of the United Kingdom from 1801 until 1885.

Under the Redistribution of Seats Act 1885, the constituency was abolished for the 1885 general election, when it was largely replaced by the new single-member constituency of Warwick and Leamington.

== Members of Parliament ==
=== MPs 1295–1640 ===
Parliament	First member	Second member
1386	Robert Norton	Henry Trymenell
1388 (Feb)	Robert Norton	Henry Trymenell
1388 (Sep)	John Raines	John Russell
1390 (Jan)	John Buckmore	Henry Filongley
1390 (Nov)		
1391	Henry de la Chamber	John Raines
1393	Maurice de la Chamber	Henry ?
1394	Maurice Luttrell	John Russell
1395	Maurice de la Chamber	John Allerwich
1397 (Jan)	Henry Trymenell	Robert Walden
1397 (Sep)	John Brome	William Ilshawe
1399	William Ruding	William Hull
1401	?John Brome	?William Hopkins
1402	John Brome	Richard Hewe
1404 (Jan)	Simon Bennett	John Weston
1404 (Oct)		
1406	John Brome	John Weston
1407	Thomas Ellam	Richard Ferrour alias Barkes
1410	John Weston	Roger Wootton
1411	John Weston	Roger Wootton
1413 (Feb)		
1413 (May)	Nicholas Rody	Roger Wootton
1414 (Apr)	John Brome	Roger Wootton
1414 (Nov)	Nicholas Rody	Roger Wootton
1415		
1416 (Mar)		
1416 (Oct)		
1417		
1419	Nicholas Rody	Roger Wootton
1420	John Rody	John Usk
1421 (May)	Nicholas Rody	John Upton
1421 (Dec)	Nicholas Rody	John Rody
1510–1523	No names known	
1529	William Newenham	Thomas Holte
1536	?	
1539	?	
1542	Clement Throckmorton	William Webbe
1545	Kenelm Throckmorton	William Pinnock
1547	Sir William Pickering	Clement Throckmorton
1553 (Mar)	Clement Throckmorton	John Throckmorton
1553 (Oct)	Clement Throckmorton	Edward Ferrers
1554 (Apr)	George Throckmorton	Thomas Fisher
1554 (Nov)	Thomas Fisher	Ralph Broune
1555	Kenelm Throckmorton	Thomas Fisher
1558	Thomas Fisher	John Butler
1558/1559	Thomas Throckmorton	Thomas Fisher
1562/1563	Walter Haddon	John Butler
1571 (Mar)	Edward Aglionby	John Fisher
1572 (Apr)	Thomas Dudley	John Fisher
1584 (Nov)	Thomas Dudley	John Fisher
1586 (Oct)	Thomas Dudley	Job Throckmorton
1588 (Oct)	James Dyer	Thomas Dudley
1593	John Hugford	William Combe
1597 (Sep)	John Townsend	William Spicer
1601 (Oct)	John Townsend	William Spicer
1604	John Townsend	William Spicer
1614	Sir Greville Verney	John Townsend
1621	John Coke	Sir Greville Verney
1624	Sir Edward Conway	Francis Lucy
1625	Sir Francis Leigh, Bt	Francis Lucy
1626	Sir Francis Leigh, Bt.	Francis Lucy
1628	Francis Lucy	Hon. Robert Greville Election declared void Replaced by Anthony Stoughton
1629-1640	No Parliaments summoned	

=== MPs 1640–1885 ===
Election	First member	First party	Second member	Second party
November 1640	William Purefoy	Parliamentarian	Sir Thomas Lucy	
December 1640	William Purefoy	Parliamentarian	Godfrey Bosvile	Parliamentarian
1653	Warwick was unrepresented in the Barebones Parliament			
1654	Richard Lucy		Warwick had only one seat in the First and Second Parliaments of the Protectorate	
1656	Clement Throckmorton		Warwick had only one seat in the First and Second Parliaments of the Protectorate	
January 1659	Fulke Lucy		Thomas Archer	
May 1659	William Purefoy		One seat vacant	
August 1659	Both seats vacant after Purefoy's death			
April 1660	Sir Clement Throckmorton		John Rous	
1661	Sir Clement Throckmorton		Henry Puckering	
1664	Fulke Greville		Sir Francis Compton	
1677	Robert Digby		Sir Francis Compton	
1678	John Bowyer		Sir Francis Compton	
February 1679	John Clopton		Henry Puckering	
August 1679	Thomas Lucy		Richard Booth	
1681	Thomas Lucy		Thomas Coventry	
1685	Simon Digby		Thomas Coventry	
1689	William Colemore		William Digby	
1695	Francis Greville		William Digby	
1698	Robert Greville		Thomas Wagstaffe	
1699	Algernon Greville		Thomas Wagstaffe	
January 1701	Francis Greville		Thomas Wagstaffe	
November 1701	Francis Greville		Algernon Greville	
1705	Francis Greville		Dodington Greville	
1710	Charles Leigh		Dodington Greville	
1713	William Colemore		Dodington Greville	
1722	William Keyt		Dodington Greville	
1727	William Keyt		William Bromley	Tory
1735	Thomas Archer		Henry Archer	
1741	Wills Hill		Henry Archer	
1756	John Spencer		Henry Archer	
1761	Hamilton Boyle		Henry Archer	
1762	Paul Methuen		Henry Archer	
March 1768	George Greville		Henry Archer	
May 1768	George Greville		Paul Methuen	
January 1774	Charles Francis Greville	Tory	Paul Methuen	
October 1774	Charles Francis Greville	Tory	Robert Fulke Greville	Tory
1780	Charles Francis Greville	Tory	Robert Ladbroke	Whig
1790	Charles Perceval	Tory	Henry Gage	Tory
1792	Charles Perceval	Tory	George Villiers	Tory
1796	Samuel Gaussen	Tory	George Villiers	Tory
1802	Charles Mills	Tory	Henry Greville	Tory
1816	Charles Mills	Tory	Charles John Greville	Tory
1826	John Tomes	Whig	Charles John Greville	Tory
1831	John Tomes	Whig	Edward Bolton King	Whig
1832	Charles John Greville	Tory	Edward Bolton King	Whig
1833	Writ suspended – seat vacant		Edward Bolton King	Whig
1835	Charles John Greville	Conservative	Edward Bolton King	Whig
1836	Charles Canning	Conservative	Edward Bolton King	Whig
March 1837	William Collins	Whig	Edward Bolton King	Whig
July 1837	William Collins	Whig	Charles Eurwicke Douglas	Conservative
1852	George William John Repton	Conservative	Edward Greaves	Conservative
1865	George William John Repton	Conservative	Arthur Peel	Liberal
1868	Edward Greaves	Conservative	Arthur Peel	Liberal
1874	George Repton	Conservative	Arthur Peel	Liberal
1885	Constituency abolished: see Warwick and Leamington			

== Election results ==
=== Elections in the 1830s ===
General election 1830: Warwick
Party	Candidate	Votes	%
Tory	Charles John Greville	Unopposed	
Whig	John Tomes (MP)	Unopposed	
Tory hold			
Whig hold			

General election 1831: Warwick
Party	Candidate	Votes	%
Whig	John Tomes (MP)	698	40.4
Whig	Edward Bolton King	523	30.3
Tory	Charles John Greville	505	29.3
Majority		18	1.0
Turnout		1,019	c. 78.4
Registered electors		c. 1,300	
Whig hold			
Whig gain from Tory			

General election 1832: Warwick
Party	Candidate	Votes	%	±%
Tory	Charles John Greville	701	40.8	+11.5
Whig	Edward Bolton King	553	32.2	+1.9
Whig	John Tomes (MP)	463	27.0	−13.4
Turnout		1,248	93.1	c. +14.7
Registered electors		1,340		
Majority		238	13.8	N/A
Tory gain from Whig		Swing	+11.5	
Majority		90	5.2	+4.2
Whig hold		Swing	−1.9	

Greville's election was later declared void but no writ was issued for a by-election to elect a new MP.

General election 1835: Warwick
Party	Candidate	Votes	%	±%
Conservative	Charles John Greville	564	38.7	+18.3
Whig	Edward Bolton King	478	32.8	−26.4
Conservative	John Halcomb	416	28.5	+8.1
Turnout		930	95.8	+2.7
Registered electors		971		
Majority		86	5.9	−7.9
Conservative hold		Swing	+15.8	
Majority		62	4.3	−0.9
Whig hold		Swing	−26.4	

Greville resigned, causing a by-election.

By-election, 23 August 1836: Warwick
Party	Candidate	Votes	%	±%
Conservative	Charles Canning	463	51.6	−15.6
Whig	Henry William Hobhouse	434	48.4	+15.6
Majority		29	3.2	−2.7
Turnout		897	85.8	−10.0
Registered electors		1,046		
Conservative hold		Swing	−15.6	

Canning was elevated to the peerage, becoming 1st Earl Canning and causing a by-election.

By-election, 28 March 1837: Warwick
Party	Candidate	Votes	%	±%
Whig	William Collins	457	52.0	+19.2
Conservative	John Adams	422	48.0	−19.2
Majority		35	4.0	−0.3
Turnout		879	86.8	−9.0
Registered electors		1,013		
Whig gain from Conservative		Swing	+19.2	

General election 1837: Warwick
Party	Candidate	Votes	%	±%
Whig	William Collins	498	35.4	+19.0
Conservative	Charles Eurwicke Douglas	468	33.3	−33.9
Whig	Edward Bolton King	439	31.2	+14.8
Turnout		909	89.7	−6.1
Registered electors		1,013		
Majority		30	2.1	−2.2
Whig hold		Swing	+18.0	
Majority		29	2.1	−3.8
Conservative hold		Swing	−33.9	

=== Elections in the 1840s ===
General election 1841: Warwick
Party	Candidate	Votes	%	±%
Whig	William Collins	Unopposed		
Conservative	Charles Eurwicke Douglas	Unopposed		
Registered electors		957		
Whig hold				
Conservative hold				

Douglas was appointed a commissioner of Greenwich Hospital, requiring a by-election.

By-election, 13 August 1845: Warwick
Party	Candidate	Votes	%	±%
Conservative	Charles Eurwicke Douglas	Unopposed		
Conservative hold				

General election 1847: Warwick
Party	Candidate	Votes	%	±%
Whig	William Collins	443	50.3	N/A
Conservative	Charles Eurwicke Douglas	407	46.3	N/A
Whig	Henry Roberts	30	3.4	N/A
Turnout		440 (est)	57.1 (est)	N/A
Registered electors		770		
Majority		36	4.0	N/A
Whig hold		Swing	N/A	
Majority		377	42.9	N/A
Conservative hold		Swing	N/A	

=== Elections in the 1850s ===
General election 1852: Warwick
Party	Candidate	Votes	%	±%
Conservative	George Repton	383	36.2	+13.0
Conservative	Edward Greaves	348	32.9	+9.7
Whig	John Mellor	327	30.9	−22.8
Majority		21	2.0	−40.9
Turnout		693 (est)	95.8 (est)	+38.7
Registered electors		723		
Conservative hold		Swing	+12.2	
Conservative gain from Whig		Swing	+10.6	

General election 1857: Warwick
Party	Candidate	Votes	%	±%
Conservative	George Repton	Unopposed		
Conservative	Edward Greaves	Unopposed		
Registered electors		734		
Conservative hold				
Conservative hold				

General election 1859: Warwick
Party	Candidate	Votes	%	±%
Conservative	George Repton	Unopposed		
Conservative	Edward Greaves	Unopposed		
Registered electors		721		
Conservative hold				
Conservative hold				

=== Elections in the 1860s ===
General election 1865: Warwick
Party	Candidate	Votes	%	±%
Conservative	George Repton	342	35.8	N/A
Liberal	Arthur Peel	315	33.0	New
Conservative	Edward Greaves	297	31.1	N/A
Turnout		635 (est)	92.0 (est)	N/A
Registered electors		690		
Majority		27	2.8	N/A
Conservative hold		Swing	N/A	
Majority		18	1.9	N/A
Liberal gain from Conservative		Swing	N/A	

General election 1868: Warwick
Party	Candidate	Votes	%	±%
Liberal	Arthur Peel	873	43.7	+10.7
Conservative	Edward Greaves	863	43.2	−23.7
Lib-Lab	Randal Cremer	260	13.0	N/A
Turnout		998 (est)	59.1 (est)	−32.9
Registered electors		1,688		
Majority		10	0.5	−1.4
Liberal hold		Swing	+17.2	
Majority		603	30.2	+27.4
Conservative hold		Swing	−17.2	

=== Elections in the 1870s ===
General election 1874: Warwick
Party	Candidate	Votes	%	±%
Conservative	George Repton	836	32.9	+11.3
Liberal	Arthur Peel	783	30.8	−12.9
Conservative	Augustus Godson	740	29.1	+7.5
Lib-Lab	Randal Cremer	180	7.1	−5.9
Turnout		1,571 (est)	94.4 (est)	+35.3
Registered electors		1,664		
Majority		53	2.1	−28.1
Conservative hold		Swing	+8.9	
Majority		43	1.7	+1.2
Liberal hold		Swing	−11.2	

=== Elections in the 1880s ===
General election 1880: Warwick
Party	Candidate	Votes	%	±%
Liberal	Arthur Peel	981	40.5	+9.7
Conservative	George Repton	768	31.7	−1.2
Conservative	Augustus Godson	676	27.9	−1.2
Majority		213	8.8	+6.7
Turnout		1,703 (est)	96.9 (est)	+2.5
Registered electors		1,758		
Liberal hold		Swing	+5.2	
Conservative hold		Swing	−5.2	

== Notes ==
Parliament of the United Kingdom
Preceded by Cambridgeshire	Constituency represented by the speaker 1884–1885	Succeeded by Warwick and Leamington
