= Lewkenor =

Lewkenor is a surname. Notable people with the surname include:

- Jane Lewkenor (c. 1492–1562), member of the English nobility
- Lewes Lewkenor (c. 1560–1627), English courtier, M.P. and writer
- Samuel Lewkenor (c. 1571–1615), English courtier, M.P. and travel writer

== See also ==
- Lewknor (surname)
- Lewknor, village in Oxfordshire
