= Thomas Lewknor =

Thomas Lewknor may refer to:

- Thomas Lewknor (MP for Lewes), represented Lewes (UK Parliament constituency) in 1467
- Thomas Lewknor (MP for Ripon) (died 1571)
- Thomas Lewknor (MP for Midhurst) (1538–1596)
