= Greville Verney, 7th Baron Willoughby de Broke =

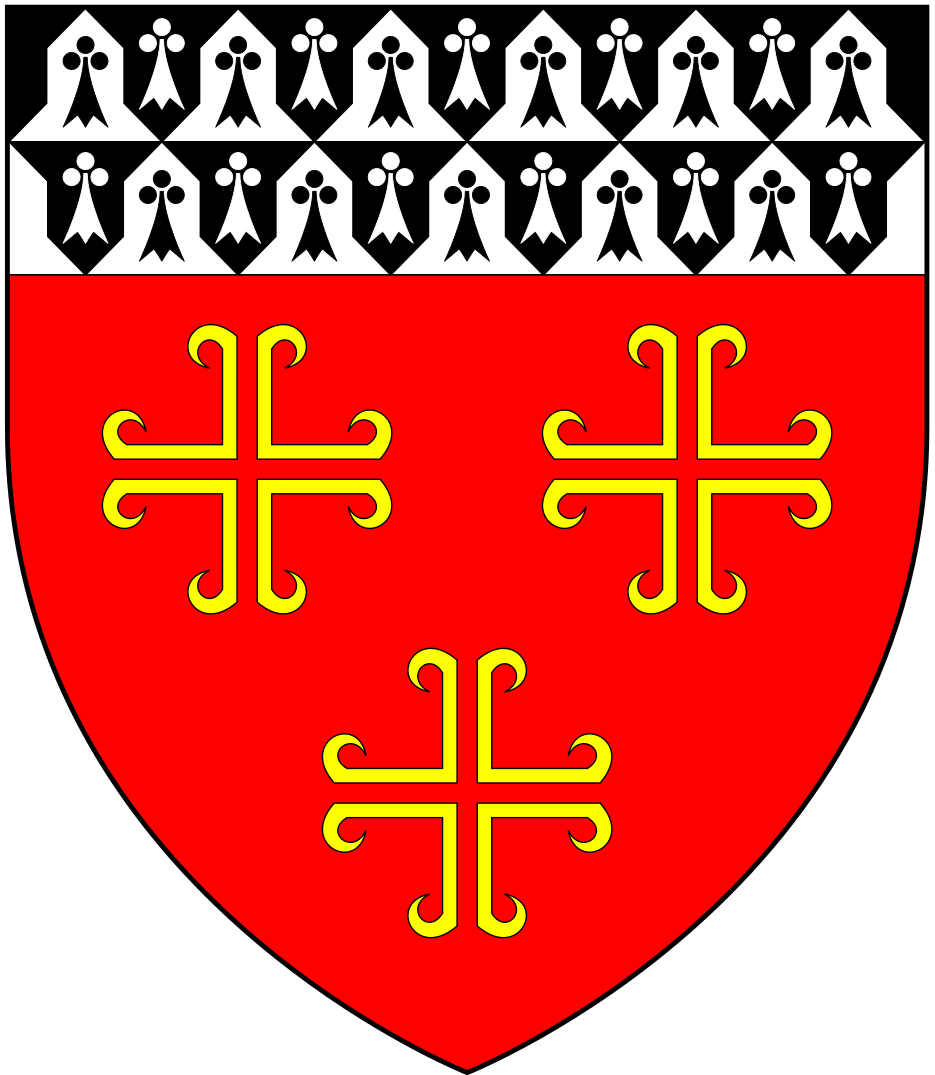
Arms of Verney: Gules, three crosses recerclée voided throughout or a chief vair ermine and ermines

Greville Verney, 7th Baron Willoughby de Broke and de jure 15th Baron Latimer (1586 – 12 May 1642) of Compton Verney in Warwickshire, England, served twice as a Member of Parliament for Warwick, in 1614 and 1621.

== Origins ==
He was the son and heir of Sir Richard Verney (1563–1630) of Compton Verney by his wife Margaret Greville (d. 1631), (from 1628 suo jure 6th Baroness Willoughby de Broke) daughter of Fulke Greville, 4th Baron Willoughby de Broke (1536–1606) of Beauchamp Court, Alcester, Warwickshire, and sister and heiress of Fulke Greville, 1st Baron Brooke, 5th Baron Willoughby de Broke (1554–1628), known before 1621 as Sir Fulke Greville the poet, dramatist, and statesman.

== Career ==
He was admitted to Gray's Inn in 1600. He also studied under the Cambridge scholar Robert Naunton, although no record of his formal admission to the university is known. In 1607 he was granted a 4 year passport, which was renewed for 3 years in 1612. He traveled widely on the Continent to complete his education, returning to sit as Member of Parliament for Warwick in 1614 through the patronage of his uncle.

He was knighted in October 1617, presumably once more thanks to his uncle. Following his marriage the next year to the step-daughter of Lord Kinclaven he was given use of Kineton, Warwickshire, which his uncle had recently purchased. He sat again as MP for Warwick in 1621.

He did not play an active role in Warwickshire until after the death of his father, when he became a JP. He inherited the titles Baron Willoughby de Broke and Baron Latimer on the death of his mother in 1631.

He was appointed Sheriff of Warwickshire in 1635 and had considerable trouble collecting Ship Money.

His death on the eve of the English Civil War, the first battle of which took place near Kineton, deprived Warwickshire of one of its political leaders.

== Marriage and issue ==
On 13 May 1618, he married Katherine Southwell, a daughter of Sir Richard Southwell (d. 1598) by his wife Elizabeth Howard, a daughter of Charles Howard, 1st Earl of Nottingham. Children:

- Greville Verney, 8th Baron Willoughby de Broke
- Richard Verney, 11th Baron Willoughby de Broke
- Elizabeth Verney, who married William Peyto, a son of Edward Peyto

== Death and succession ==
He died on 12 May 1642 when the title passed to his son Greville Verney, 8th Baron Willoughby de Broke. His younger son inherited the title on the death of the 8th baron's grandson.

Parliament of England
Preceded by John Townsend; William Spicer	Member of Parliament for Warwick; 1614–1622; With: John Townsend 1614; John Coke 1621–1622	Succeeded by Sir Edward Conway; Francis Lucy
Peerage of England
Preceded by Margaret Verney	Baron Willoughby de Broke; 1631–1642	Succeeded by Greville Verney
