= Simon Bennett =

Simon Bennett or Bennet may refer to:

- Simon Bennett (MP) for Warwick in 1404
- Sir Simon Bennet, 1st Baronet (c. 1584–1631) Bennet baronets
- Simon Bennett (director), see List of Outrageous Fortune episodes
- Simon Bennett (referee) with Select Group
- Simon Bennett, character in The Impossible (2012 film)
- Simon Bennett (game developer), co-founder of Roll7
- Simon Bennett, see 2010 United Kingdom general election, of the BNP and British Freedom Party

== See also ==
- Sion Bennett, Welsh rugby union player
