= John Townsend (MP for Warwick) =

English politician

John Townsend of Warwick was an English politician who sat in the House of Commons from 1597 to 1614.

Townsend was the son of Richard Townsend of Warwick and his wife Christian.

He was bailiff of Warwick from 1589 to 1590 and then in 1597 and 1901 elected Member of Parliament for the town. After another period as bailiff in 1603–04 he was re-elected MP for Warwick to the Addled Parliament of 1614. He was finally bailiff again from 1621 to 1622.

Townsend died after 1622.

Parliament of England
Preceded by John Hugford; William Combe	Member of Parliament for Warwick; 1597; With: William Spicer 1597–1604; Sir Greville Verney	Succeeded by Sir Greville Verney; John Coke
