= Algernon Greville (MP) =

British politician

Algernon Greville (c. 1677 – 28 April 1720) was the second son of Fulke Greville, 5th Baron Brooke, son of Robert Greville, 2nd Baron Brooke, and his wife Sarah Dashwood. He married Mary, daughter and coheir of Lord Arthur Somerset, the youngest son of Henry Somerset, 1st Duke of Beaufort. Their daughter, Mary (20 December 1713 – 1 March 1786), who married Shuckburgh Boughton (d. 1763) in 1736, had Sir Charles William Rouse Boughton, 1st and 9th Bt.

He served as member of Parliament for Warwick from 1699 to 1705 (with a short gap). His son Fulke Greville represented Monmouth Boroughs from 1747 to 1752.

Parliament of England
Preceded by Robert Greville; Sir Thomas Wagstaffe	MP for Warwick; 1699–1701; With: Sir Thomas Wagstaffe	Succeeded by Francis Greville; Sir Thomas Wagstaffe
Preceded by Francis Greville; Sir Thomas Wagstaffe	MP for Warwick; 1701–1705; With: Francis Greville	Succeeded by Francis Greville; Dodington Greville
