= Francis Lucy =

English lawyer and politician (c. 1600–1687)

Francis Lucy (c. 1600 – 1687) was an English lawyer and politician who sat in the House of Commons from 1624 to 1629.

Lucy was the son of Sir Thomas Lucy of Charlecote Park, Warwickshire. He matriculated at Trinity College, Oxford on 5 May 1615, aged 15. He was called to the bar at Lincoln's Inn in 1623. In 1624, he was elected member of parliament for Warwick in the Happy Parliament. He was elected MP for Warwick again in 1625, 1626 and 1628 and sat until 1629 when King Charles decided to rule without parliament for eleven years.

Lucy obtained a licence on 9 December 1630, to marry Elizabeth Molesworth, daughter of Bevill Molesworth of Hoddesdon, Hertfordshire.

Parliament of England
| Preceded by John Coke; Sir Greville Verney | Member of Parliament for Warwick; 1624–1629; With: Sir Edward Conway 1621–1622; Sir Francis Leigh, Bt 1625–1626; Hon. Robert Greville 1628; Anthony Stoughton 1628–1629 | Parliament suspended until 1640 |
