= John Coke =

English civil servant (1563–1644)

Sir John Coke MP JP PC
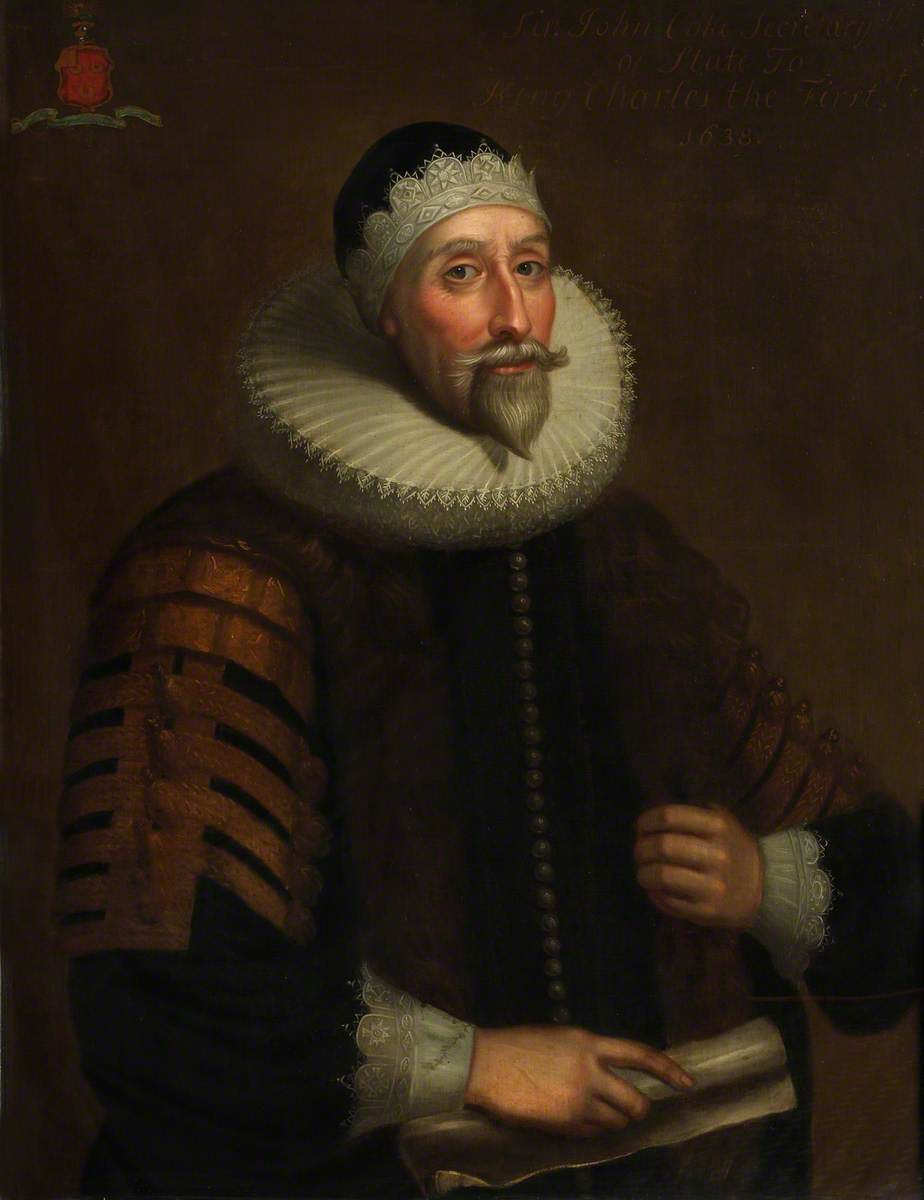
- Sir John Coke c. 1639

Secretary of State
- In office September 1625 – January 1640

Member of Parliament for Cambridge University
- In office February 1626 – March 1629

Lord Privy Seal
- In office 1625–1628

Member of Parliament for St Germans
- In office 1624–1625

Master of Requests
- In office November 1622 – 1625

Member of Parliament for Warwick
- In office January 1621 – January 1622

Personal details
- Born: 5 March 1563 Trusley, Derbyshire, Kingdom of England
- Died: 8 September 1644 (aged 81) Tottenham, Middlesex, Kingdom of England
- Spouse(s): (1) Mary Powell (1604–1624) (her death) (2) Joan Lee (1624–his death)
- Children: Joseph (ca.1605–1624); John (1607–1650); Thomas (1610–1656); Ann (1617–1686);
- Education: Trinity College, Cambridge
- Occupation: Civil servant and politician

Sir John Coke (5 March 1563 – 8 September 1644) was an English civil servant and naval administrator, described by one commentator as "the Samuel Pepys of his day". He was MP for various constituencies in the House of Commons between 1621 and 1629, and served as Secretary of State under Charles I, playing a key part in government during the eleven years of Personal Rule from 1629 to 1640.

The younger son of a Derbyshire lawyer, Coke owed his career to the patronage of Fulke Greville, 1st Baron Brooke and George Villiers, 1st Duke of Buckingham, both of whom valued his efficiency and capacity for hard work. This brought him to the attention of Charles I, who appointed him Secretary of State in 1625 with responsibility for implementing his domestic policy. The Royalist statesman Edward Hyde, 1st Earl of Clarendon later wrote that he was "unadorn’d with any parts of vigour or quickness", but he retained this position until dismissed at the age of 77 in January 1640.

When the First English Civil War began in August 1642, his eldest son John supported Parliament while his younger son Thomas joined the Royalists. Too old to take part and with his country house of Melbourne Hall occupied by a Parliamentarian garrison, Coke moved to Tottenham, where he died on 8 September 1644.

== Personal details ==
John Coke was born in Trusley on 5 March 1563, second son of Richard Coke (ca.1540–1582), a prominent Derbyshire lawyer, and his wife Mary. He was one of at least four children, the others being his elder brother Francis (1561–1639), who inherited the family estates, George Coke (1570–1646), later Bishop of Hereford, and Dorothy, wife of Valentine Cary (ca. 1570–1626), Bishop of Exeter from 1621 to 1626.

Coke married twice, the first time in 1604 to Mary or Marie Powell (ca.1578–1624), with whom he had six surviving children; Joseph (ca.1605–1624), John (1607–1650), Thomas (1610–1656), Ann (1617–1686);

== Career ==
Thought to have attended Westminster School, Coke entered Trinity College, Cambridge in 1576, where he remained for the next fifteen years, serving as a lecturer in rhetoric from 1584 to 1591. During this period, he became loosely acquainted with a circle of friends around Robert Devereux, 2nd Earl of Essex including Fulke Greville, 1st Baron Brooke, for whom he seems to have acted as an accountant. He left Cambridge in 1591 to work for Greville full time, then spent the years from 1593 to 1597 travelling in Europe, almost certainly on behalf of Essex who was seeking to establish a network of agents there.

In 1621 Coke was elected Member of Parliament for Warwick. He was appointed a Master of Requests in 1622 and was knighted in 1624. In 1624 he was elected MP for St Germans and was re-elected for the seat in 1625. In the parliament of 1625 Coke acted as a secretary of state; in this and later parliaments he introduced the royal requests for money, and defended the foreign policy of Charles I and Buckingham, and afterwards the actions of the king. His actual appointment as secretary dates from September 1625. He was elected MP for Cambridge University in 1626 and 1628. Disliked by the leaders of the popular party, his speeches in the House of Commons did not improve the king's position.

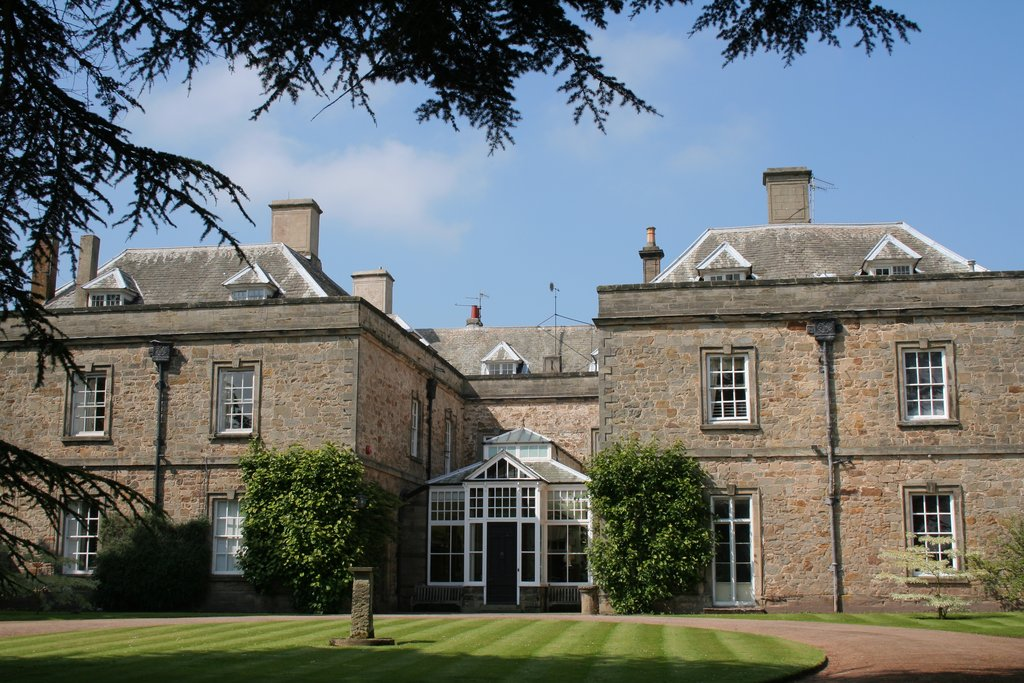
Melbourne Hall, Derbyshire

Coke married Marie Powell, and they set up home at Hall Court, Kynaston, Much Marcle. Several of their letters to each other survive.

King Charles ruled without a parliament from 1628 and he found Coke's industry very useful to him. Coke kept his post until 1640. Dismissed from office, he retired to his estate at Melbourne in Derbyshire, which he had bought in 1628. He died at his house in Tottenham near London, on 8 September 1644.

Coke in his earlier years had been a defender of absolute monarchy and greatly disliked the papacy. He was described by Clarendon as "a man of very dumb education and a narrower mind"; and again he says, "his cardinal perfection was industry and his most eminent infirmity covetousness."

Coke's elder son, Sir John Coke was a Parliamentarian in the English Civil War, while his younger son Thomas Coke was a Royalist.

The Coke family continued to own Melbourne Hall until George Lewis Coke, an ambiguous figure who died childless in 1777. His sister married the family's lawyer and the Coke name was lost.

== Sources ==
- Lockyer, Roger (1984). Buckingham: The Life and Political Career of George Villiers, First Duke of Buckingham 1592-1628. Taylor, Francis. ISBN 978-0582494152.
- Thrush, Andrew (2010). COKE, John (1563-1644), of Hall Court, Kynaston, Herefs.; Garlick Hill, London and Tottenham, Mdx.; later of Melbourne Hall, Melbourne, Derbys in The History of Parliament: the House of Commons 1604-1629. CUP. ISBN 978-1107002258.
- Young, Michael (2004). "Coke, Sir John (1563–1644)". Oxford Dictionary of National Biography (online ed.). Oxford University Press. doi:10.1093/ref:odnb/5828. (Subscription, Wikipedia Library access or UK public library membership required.)
- Young, Michael (1986). Servility and Service: The Life and Work of Sir John Coke. Royal Historical Society. ISBN 978-0861932023.

Parliament of England
Preceded by Sir Greville Verney; John Townsend	Member of Parliament for Warwick; 1621–1622; With: Sir Greville Verney	Succeeded by Sir Edward Conway; Francis Lucy
Preceded by Richard Tisdale; Sir Richard Buller	Member of Parliament for St Germans; 1624–1625; With: Sir John Stradling 1624; Sir Henry Marten	Succeeded by Sir Henry Marten; Sir John Eliot
Preceded by Sir Robert Naunton; Sir Albert Morton	Member of Parliament for Cambridge University; 1626–1629; With: Thomas Eden	Parliament suspended until 1640
Political offices
Preceded by Sir Albertus Morton; Sir Edward Conway	Secretary of State; 1625–1640; With: Sir Edward Conway 1625–1628; Dudley Carleton, 1st Viscount Dorchester 1628–1632; Sir Francis Windebank 1632–1640	Succeeded by Sir Francis Windebank; Sir Henry Vane
Preceded by The Earl of Worcester	Lord Privy Seal; 1625–1628	Succeeded by Sir Robert Naunton
