= William Ilshawe =

English politician

William Ilshawe (fl. 1385 – 1406) was an English politician. He sat as MP for Warwick in September 1397.

He was the son of John Ilshawe and married Margaret.

In autumn of 1397, he was acting under sheriff of Warwickshire as deputy to Robert Goushill. He served as a burgess for Warwick between 1404 and 1405.
