= Thomas Dudley (MP) =

16th-century English politician

Thomas Dudley (died 1593) was an English politician.

== Life ==
He was the third son of Thomas Dudley of Yanwath, Cumberland and Grace, co-heiress of Sir Lancelot Threlkeld of Yanwath. John Dudley (died 1580) was one of his older brothers. He was listed among the gentlemen of John Dudley, 1st Duke of Northumberland in 1553, served in the household of Jane Dudley, Duchess of Northumberland until her death, and then joined the household of Robert Dudley, 1st Earl of Leicester, becoming Comptroller by 1571.

He was returned as a Member (MP) of the Parliament of England for Coventry in 1563, Wallingford in 1571, Warwick in 1572, 1584, 1586 and 1589, through the influence of Leicester and his brother Ambrose Dudley, 3rd Earl of Warwick. His return as MP for Newtown, Isle of Wight in 1593 was due to Sir George Carey, governor of the Isle of Wight.

He apparently never married. By the time of his death he was in debt and instructed his nephew Anthony Blencowe (later provost of Oriel College, Oxford), as heir and executor, to sell his land and goods to satisfy his creditors.
