= John Dudley (died 1580) =

16th-century English politician

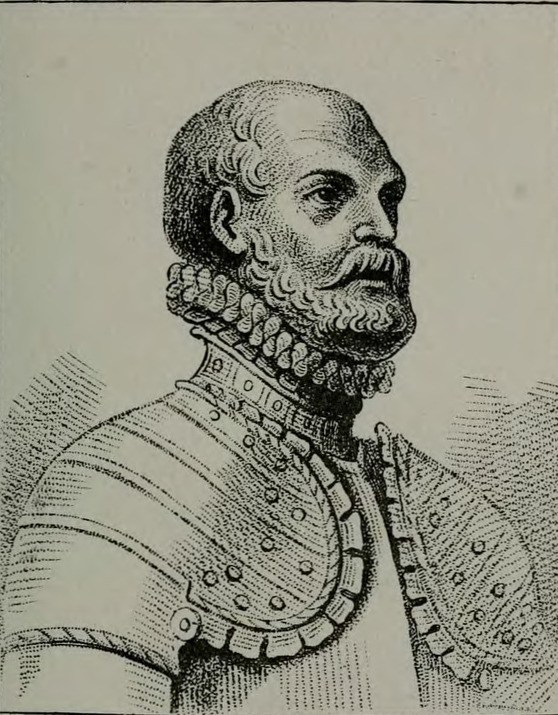
- Died: 29 December 1580
- Occupation: Politician
- Children: Ann Gardiner Dudley
- Parent(s): Thomas Dudley; Grace Threlkeld
- Relatives: Thomas Dudley
- Position held: Member of the March 1553 Parliament, Member of the 1563-67 Parliament

John Dudley (by 1526–1580), of Stoke Newington, Middlesex, was an English politician.

== Life ==
He was the second son of Thomas Dudley of Yanwath, Cumberland and Grace, co-heiress of Sir Lancelot Threlkeld of Yanwath. Thomas Dudley (MP) was his younger brother.

He joined the household of Thomas Wharton, 1st Baron Wharton, who secured his return as Member (MP) of the Parliament of England for Carlisle in March 1553. By 1559 he had joined the household of Robert Dudley, 1st Earl of Leicester. He was granted special admittance to the Inner Temple in 1561 at the same time as Leicester. He was returned as MP for Helston in 1563. This was presumably through the influence of Francis Russell, 2nd Earl of Bedford, Lord Warden of the Stannaries and father-in-law of Ambrose Dudley, 3rd Earl of Warwick. In 1565 he became joint clerk of the signet to the Council of Wales and the Marches and governor of the royal mines in 1568.

He had acquired the manor of Stoke Newington by 1569. He died on 29 December 1580.

== Family ==
He married he married Elizabeth, the daughter of John Gardiner of Chalfont St Giles, Bucks, who after his death married Thomas Sutton. His daughter and heir Anne married Francis Popham (1573–1644).
