= Simon Bennett (MP) =

English member of parliament (died 1411–1417)

Simon Bennett (died between 1411 and 1417), was an English Member of Parliament.

He was a Member (MP) of the Parliament of England for Warwick in January 1404.

Parliament of England
Preceded by John Brome; Richard Hewe	Member of Parliament for Warwick; Jan. 1404; With: John Weston	Succeeded by ? ?
