= Henry Puckering =

English politician

Henry Puckering (1638–1664) was an English politician from Warwickshire.

Puckering was apparently the only surviving son of his father, Sir Henry Puckering, 3rd Baronet, of The Priory in Warwick. His father had been born Henry Newton, but changed the family's name to Puckering some time after 1636, when he inherited the estates of his uncle Sir Thomas Puckering, 1st Baronet. (The title came not from the uncle, but from his father Sir William Newton, 2nd Baronet).

The younger Henry Puckering was educated at Trinity College, Cambridge, where graduated in 1657. He travelled abroad 1657 to 1658, and was admitted as a member of the Inner Temple in 1658.

At the general election of 1661 he was elected in his father's interest to the first Cavalier Parliament as a Member of Parliament for the borough of Warwick. He appears to have been a fairly active member, but died during the recess before the new session of Parliament began in March 1664.

His grave monument in Warwick was sculpted by James Hardy.

Parliament of England
Preceded by John Rous; Sir Clement Throckmorton	Member of Parliament for Warwick; 1661–1664; With: Sir Clement Throckmorton	Succeeded by Sir Francis Compton; Fulke Greville
