= Clement Throckmorton (died 1663) =

English politician

Sir Clement Throckmorton (c. 1630 – 10 November 1663) was an English politician who sat in the House of Commons variously between 1656 and 1663.

Throckmorton was the son of Sir Clement Throckmorton of Haseley Warwickshire, and his wife Lettice Fisher, daughter of Sir Clement Fisher of Packington, Warwickshire.

In 1656, Throckmorton was elected Member of Parliament for Warwick in the Second Protectorate Parliament.

In 1660, Throckmorton was elected MP for Warwick in the Convention Parliament. He was knighted on 11 September 1660. In 1661 he was re-elected MP for Warwick for the Cavalier Parliament and sat until his death.

Parliament of England
Preceded by Richard Lucy	Member of Parliament for Warwick; 1656	Succeeded by Fulke Lucy; Thomas Archer
Preceded by William Purefoy	Member of Parliament for Warwick; 1660–1664; With: John Rous 1660; Henry Puckering 1661–64	Succeeded by Fulke Greville; Sir Francis Compton
