= Sir Francis Compton =

English soldier and politician

Sir Francis Compton (c.1629 – 20 December 1716) was an English soldier and politician. He sat in the Cavalier Parliament of the House of Commons between 1664 and 1679.

Compton was the 5th son of Spencer Compton, 2nd Earl of Northampton. His brothers included Sir Charles Compton and Sir William Compton.

Compton married 4 times. His first marriage was to Elizabeth, the daughter and co-heir of Sir Capel Bedell, 1st Baronet. The second, in June 1664, was to Jane daughter of Sir John Trevor. Jane died in 1677, and he later married Mary, daughter of Samuel Fortrey of Kew, widow of Sir Thomas Trevor, 1st Baronet. His fourth marriage, in 1699, was to Sarah, niece of Anthony Rowe MP of Whitehall.

He was commissioned in February 1661 as a lieutenant in the Royal Horse Guards (The Blues), and knighted in December of that year. He rose to the rank of lieutenant-colonel in 1678.

He was a Member of Parliament for Warwick from 1664 to 1679.

Parliament of England
Preceded by Henry Puckering (younger); Sir Clement Throckmorton	Member of Parliament for Warwick; 1664–1679; With: Fulke Greville 1664–77; The 3rd Lord Digby 1677–78; Sir John Bowyer, Bt 1678–79	Succeeded by Sir John Clopton; Sir Henry Puckering, Bt
