= William Webbe (fl. 1542) =

English politician

William Webbe (fl. 1542), of Warwick Castle, Warwick, was an English politician.

He was a member (MP) of the Parliament of England for Warwick in 1542.
