= William Pinnock (MP) =

English Member of Parliament

William Pinnock (by 1509–55), of Hanley Castle, Worcestershire, was an English Member of Parliament (MP).

He was a Member of the Parliament of England for Warwick in 1545, during the reign of Henry VIII.
