= Richard Verney =

English politician

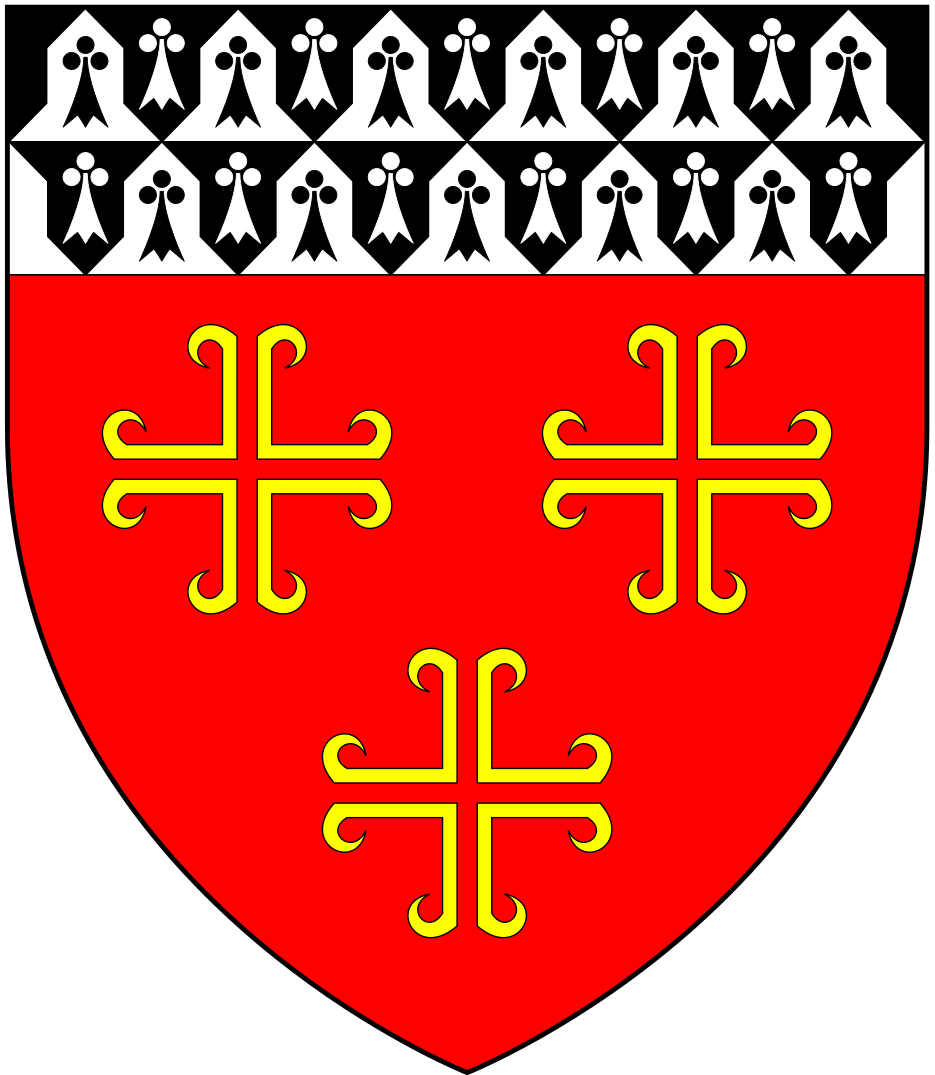
Arms of Verney: Gules, three crosses recerclée voided throughout or a chief vair ermine and ermines

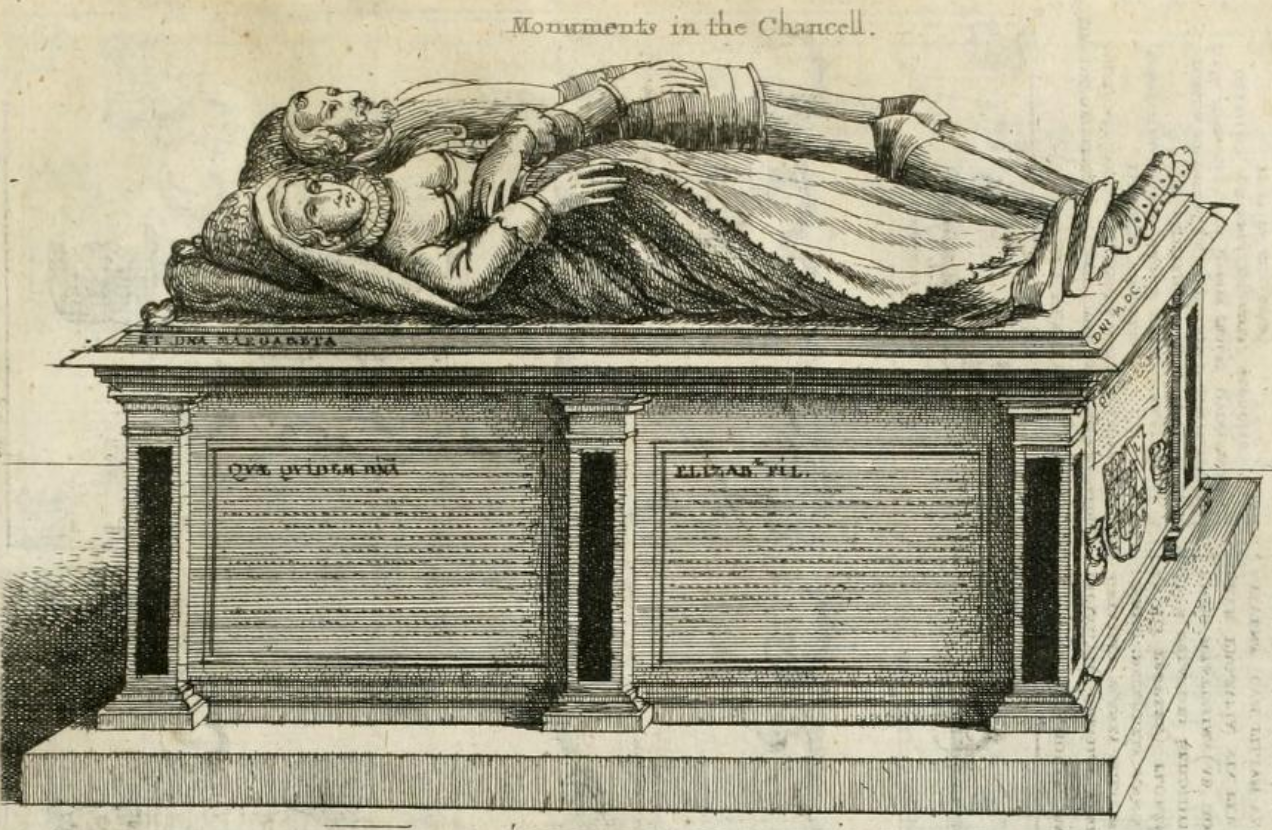
Chest tomb of Sir Richard Verney with effigies of him and his wife Margaret Greville, made by Nicholas Stone, master-mason to King Charles I. Drawn in 1656 by William Dugdale when in the old Church of Compton Verney, demolished in 18th.c., and moved to present position in the Chapel of Compton Verney House

Sir Richard Verney (1563 – 7 August 1630) of Compton Verney in Warwickshire, England, was a landowner and politician who sat in the House of Commons at various times between 1589 and 1614.

== Origins ==
He was the eldest son of George Verney (d. 1574) of Compton Verney, by his wife Jane Lucy, daughter of William Lucy of Charlecote in Warwickshire.

== Career ==
In 1574, aged 11, he inherited his deceased father's estates. He entered Gray's Inn in 1582 to train as a lawyer and served as a Justice of the Peace from about 1584 when he came of age aged 21. In 1589 he was elected as a Member of Parliament for Warwickshire. He was Sheriff of Warwickshire for 1590–1, during which time he became liable for a penalty of £1,000 due to the escape of an important prisoner under his custody. He was Commissioner for Musters by 1597. In 1601 he was elected as an MP for West Looe in Cornwall. He was knighted in 1603 and was Sheriff of Warwickshire again for 1604–5. He may have been an MP for Warwickshire again during the 1604 to 1611 Parliament, and was elected an MP for Warwickshire in 1614.

== Marriage and issue ==
Arms of Greville: Sable, on a cross engrailed or five pellets a bordure engrailed of the second

On 29 October 1582 at Alcester he married Margaret Greville (d. 26 March 1631), (later from 1628 suo jure 6th Baroness Willoughby de Broke) daughter of Fulke Greville, 4th Baron Willoughby de Broke (1536–1606) of Beauchamp Court, Alcester, Warwickshire, and sister and heiress of Fulke Greville, 1st Baron Brooke, 5th Baron Willoughby de Broke (1554–1628), known before 1621 as Sir Fulke Greville the poet, dramatist, and statesman. Verney was said to be an affectionate family man and a good friend and spent much of his time in the social round of visits and entertainments. He was often at Beauchamp Court, the home of his brother-in-law Sir Fulke Greville. By his wife he had four sons and four daughters, including:

- Greville Verney, 7th Baron Willoughby de Broke, eldest son and heir, who inherited the title Baron Willoughby de Broke on the death of his mother in 1631.

== Death and burial ==
He died in 1630 at the age of 66 after a short illness and was buried in the chapel at Compton Verney, where survives his monument by Nicholas Stone, master-mason to King Charles I, comprising alabaster recumbent effigy, with that of his wife, on a chest tomb.

Parliament of England
Preceded by Sir John Harington; Fulke Greville	Member of Parliament for Warwickshire; 1589; With: Fulke Greville	Succeeded by Fulke Greville; Sir Edward Greville
Preceded by Robert Hitcham; Sir Henry Lennard	Member of Parliament for West Looe; 1601; With: John Hare	Succeeded by Sir George Harvey; Sir William Wade
Preceded by Fulke Greville; Sir Robert Digby	Member of Parliament for Warwickshire; 1604–1614; With: Sir Edward Greville 1604–1611; Sir Thomas Lucy	Succeeded by Fulke Greville; Sir Thomas Lucy
