= Thomas Holte (MP) =

16th-century English politician

Thomas Holte (by 1500 – 23 March 1546) was an English politician.

He was a member (MP) of the parliament of England for Warwick in 1529.
