= John Rous (Warwick MP) =

Member of the Parliament of England

John Rous (c. 1618 – 2 November 1680) was an English politician who sat in the House of Commons in 1660.

Rous was the son of John Rous of Rous Lench, Worcestershire and his wife Esther Temple, daughter of Sir Thomas Temple, 1st Baronet of Burton Dassett, Warwickshire. He was a student of Lincoln's Inn in 1636. He was a J.P. and commissioner for assessment for Warwickshire from 1649 to 1652. He was commissioner for assessment for Coventry from 1650 to 1652. He was re-instated as JP for Warwickshire in 1653 and remained to his death. In 1657 he was commissioner for assessment for Warwickshire and for Coventry. He was a commissioner for militia for Warwickshire in March 1660.

In 1660, Rous was elected Member of Parliament for Warwick in the Convention Parliament. He was commissioner for assessment for Warwickshire from August 1660 and for Warwick from September 1660 until his death.. From 1675 to 1676, he was Sheriff of Warwickshire.

Rous died at the age of about 62, and was buried at Bishop’s Tachbrooke.

Rous married Mary Wagstaffe, widow of Thomas Wagstaffe of Tachbrooke Mallory and daughter of John Combe of The College, Stratford-on-Avon, Warwickshire. He was the brother of Sir Thomas Rous, 1st Baronet.

Parliament of England
| Preceded by William Purefoy | Member of Parliament for Warwick; 1660; With: Clement Throckmorton | Succeeded by Clement Throckmorton; Henry Puckering |
