= Thomas Sutton =

English civil servant and businessman

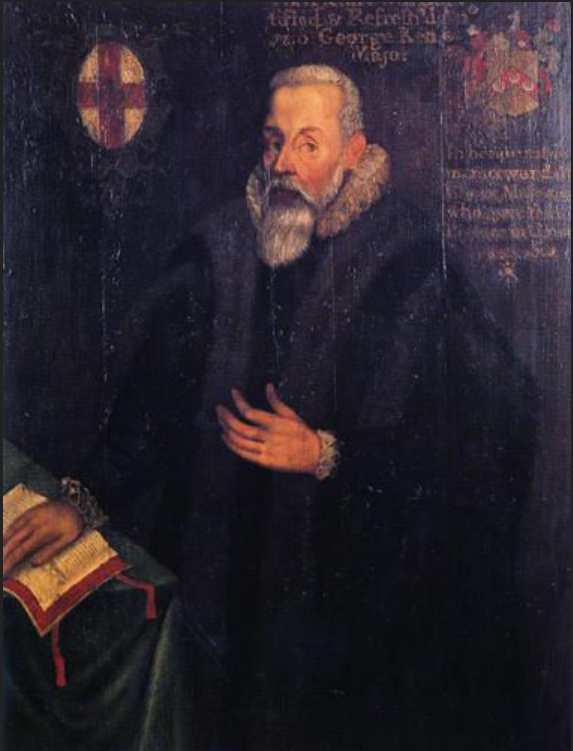
Thomas Sutton, ca. 1590

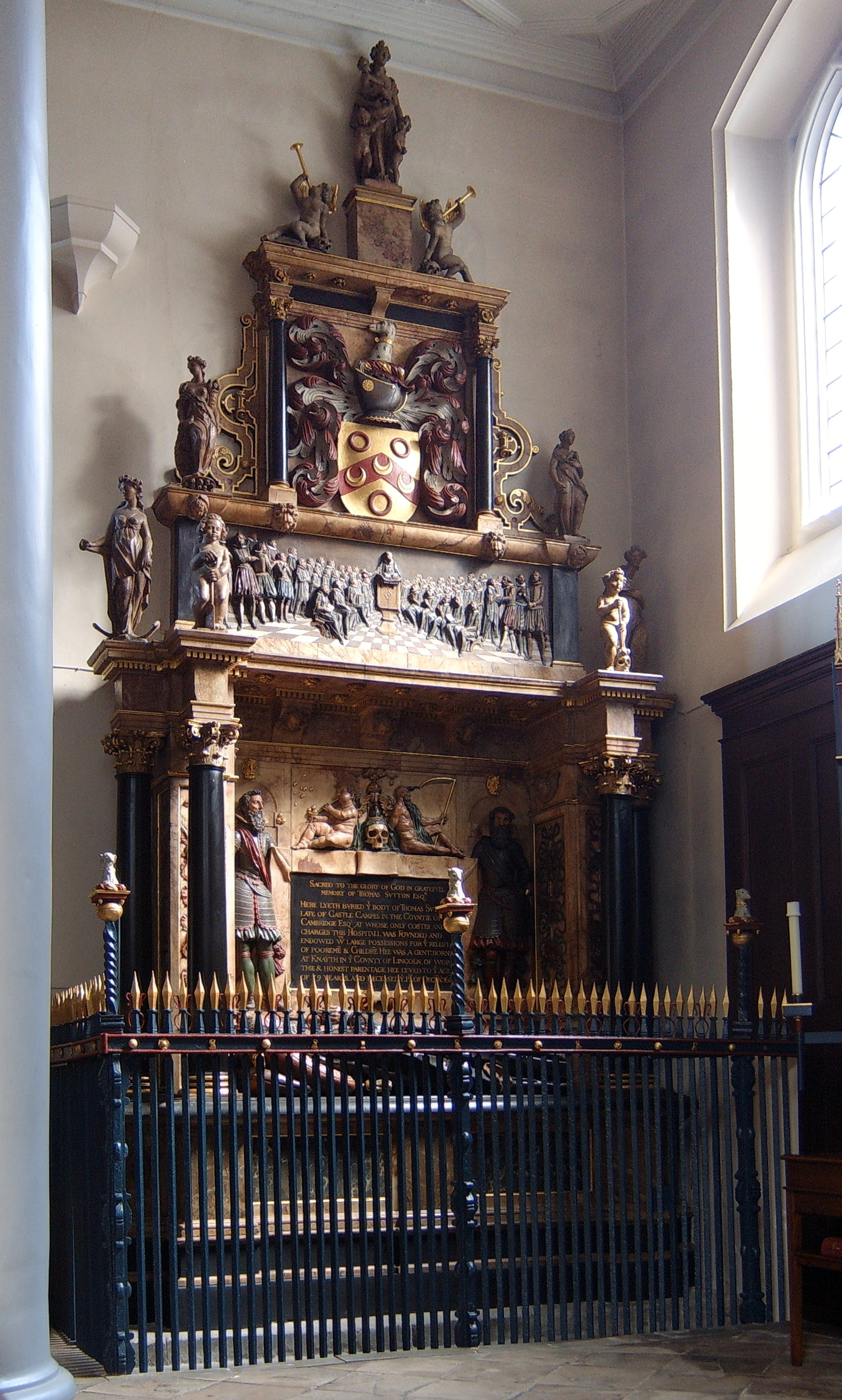
Tomb of Thomas Sutton in the chapel of the London Charterhouse

Thomas Sutton (1532 – 12 December 1611) was an English civil servant and businessman, born in Knaith, Lincolnshire. He is remembered as the founder of the London Charterhouse and of Charterhouse School.

== Life ==
Sutton was the son of an official of the city of Lincoln, and was educated at Eton College and at St John's College, Cambridge. For much of his life he held the prestigious role of Master of the Ordnance in the North, which meant that he was responsible for military supplies and fortification in the north of England. He also obtained the lease of the manors of Whickham and Gateshead, just south of Newcastle, in 1578, and so gained much of his early wealth from the coal mines in the area and from the sale of this lease five years later.

In 1582, he married Elizabeth, the daughter of John Gardiner of Chalfont St Giles, Bucks and the widow of John Dudley of Stoke Newington. Dudley was a distant cousin of the earls of Warwick and Leicester, who had amassed a considerable fortune and this marriage more than doubled Sutton's annual rent income.

Sutton's connections to the Dudley family were strong throughout his life. Early in his career, Sutton had held a post under the Earl of Warwick, who then helped him to the post of Master of Ordnance in the North in 1569, and the Earl of Leicester, a favourite of Elizabeth I, was instrumental in gaining Sutton the lease of Whickham and Gateshead.

Sutton bought Howard House from the Earl of Suffolk, which occupied the site of a former Carthusian Monastery on the outskirts of the City of London. Although dissolved by Henry VIII, parts of the monastery still survived. Sutton also purchased the manor of Castle Campes in Cambridgeshire, which had been in possession of the de Vere family for over five hundred years, and, among other landholdings, he also owned the manors of Haddock, Littlebury, and Balsham, all near Saffron Walden in Essex.

In 1588 Sutton contributed £100 to defend the realm against the Spanish Armada, and it has been suggested he owned, and perhaps commanded, The Sutton, a barque of seventy tons and thirty men out of Weymouth, which captured a Spanish vessel and her cargo (estimated value of £20,000).

Later in his career, Sutton became one of the chief moneylenders in England, securing loans worth as little as a few shillings and as much as thousands of pounds to everyone from farmers to some of the most prominent courtiers, businesspeople, and politicians of his era, including Lord Burghley, Sir Edward Coke, Sir Percival Willoughby, Lord Compton, and the Earl of Sussex, among others, generally at the standard rate of ten percent per annum.

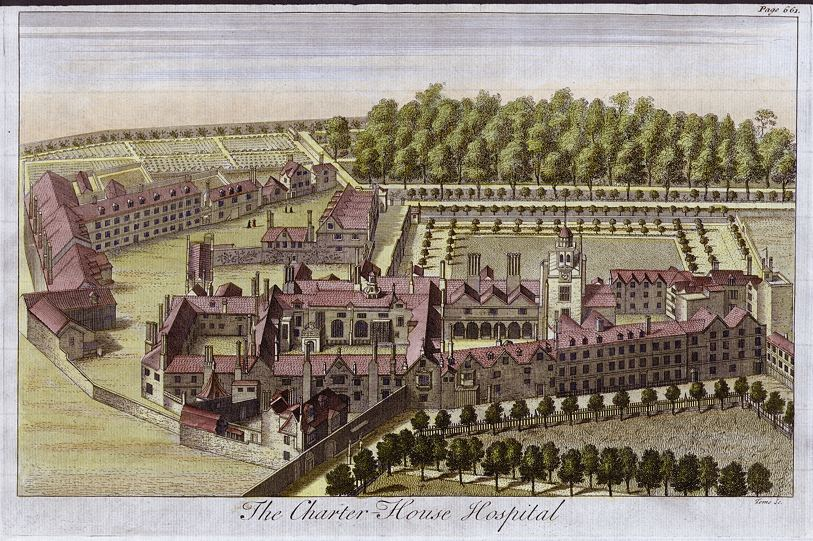
Charterhouse Hospital in around 1770

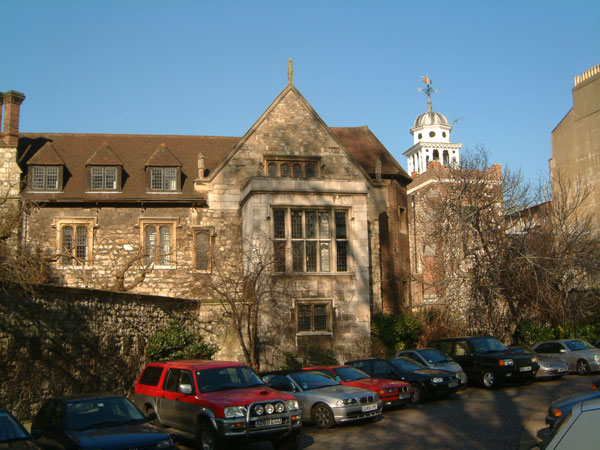
Tudor buildings of Charterhouse

Sutton died on 12 December 1611 at his house in Homerton. He was then considered one of the richest individuals in England, with an estate worth approximately £4,836 per annum; and his accounts showed that he was personally worth over £50,000, mostly in the form of outstanding obligations and recognizances from the many people in debt to him. This immense wealth earned Sutton the nicknames among his contemporaries of "Croesus" and "Riche Sutton".

== Legacy ==
Sutton left part of his fortune to be invested in establishing an almshouse for 80 impoverished gentlemen, combined with a school for 40 boys, on the site of his house off Charterhouse Square, on the outskirts of the City of London. This institution was to be named the Hospital of King James in Charterhouse, although it later became known as Sutton's Hospital in Charterhouse. The almshouse survives on the original site; while the school, now Charterhouse School, relocated to Godalming, Surrey, in 1872. The London buildings were badly damaged by bombs during the Second World War, but were restored during the 1950s.

Sutton's personal arms, blazoned Or, on a chevron between three annulets gules three crescents of the field, are still used by the school.

John Aubrey is responsible for the almost certainly spurious legend that Sutton was the original of Volpone the fox in Ben Jonson's play Volpone.

== See also ==
- Case of Sutton's Hospital

== Sources ==
- Chisholm, Hugh, ed. (1911). "Sutton, Thomas" . Encyclopædia Britannica. Vol. 26 (11th ed.). Cambridge University Press.
- Cooper, Thompson (1898). "Sutton, Thomas (1532-1611)" . In Lee, Sidney (ed.). Dictionary of National Biography. Vol. 55. London: Smith, Elder & Co.
- Trevor-Roper, Hugh. "Sutton, Thomas (1532–1611)". Oxford Dictionary of National Biography (online ed.). Oxford University Press. doi:10.1093/ref:odnb/26806. (Subscription, Wikipedia Library access or UK public library membership required.)
