= Thomas Fisher (MP) =

16th-century English politician

Thomas Fisher or Hawkins (died 1577), was an English politician.

== Early life ==
He was of obscure origin and was usually known by the name of Fisher, because his father was a fishmonger in Warwick. His ability recommended him to John Dudley, Viscount Lisle, who took him into his service, and on 4 May 1542 constituted him high steward and bailiff of his manor of Kibworth Beauchamp, Leicestershire. For his exercise of that office during life Fisher had an annuity granted to him, which was confirmed in the reign of Mary I. He became one of the two Members of Parliament for Warwick.

== Dissolution of the monasteries ==
He contrived to accumulate a vast estate in monastery and church lands. In 1546 he obtained the site of St Sepulchre's Priory, Warwick, with the lands adjacent, and proceeded to pull the monastery to the ground, raising in the place of it a house Hawkyns-nest, or Hawks-nest, also the 'Priory'; now the estate is Priory Park. In 1547, Bishop's Itchington, Warwickshire, being alienated to him from the see of Coventry and Lichfield, he made an 'absolute depopulation' of that part called Nether Itchington, and demolished the church for the purpose of building a large manor-house on its site. He also changed the name of the village to Fisher's Itchington.

== Secretary to Somerset and Scottish war ==
Fisher, who was now the chief citizen of Warwick, was secretary to the Duke of Somerset, protector of England. There is a tradition that he was colonel of a regiment in the English army at the battle of Pinkie, on 10 September 1547.

Towards the end of June 1548 he was commissioned by Somerset to travel north to Francis Talbot, 5th Earl of Shrewsbury and William Grey, 13th Baron Grey de Wilton, with instructions for the defence of Haddington, and for the other manoeuvres of the army in Scotland. He was also to go to Sir John Luttrell at Broughty, and with him and Patrick Gray, 4th Lord Gray of Scotland to devise a means of communicating with Archibald Campbell, 4th Earl of Argyll for negotiations. He was told to take the assured Scots Alexander Crichton of Brunstane and John Cockburn of Ormiston into his confidence, and reward the Scottish Lord Gray with a gold chain and money. Fisher reported what he had accomplished to Somerset and William Cecil from Berwick upon Tweed on 30 July.

In March 1549 he was appointed along with John Luttrell to confer with the Earls of Argyll, Atholl, Errol and other Scottish nobles for the return of Mary, Queen of Scots from France and 'accomplishment of the godly purpose of marriage'. On 17 September 1549 he complained in letter to William Cecil, dated from Innerwick, about the abandonment of Haddington and his own eyes and legs swollen with the rheum.

In 1552 he had a grant of the bailiwick of Banbury, Oxfordshire. He was also made collector of the king's revenue within the borough and hundred, and governor of Banbury Castle.

== Under Mary I ==
It was rumoured that the Duke of Northumberland, anticipating want of money to pay the forces which would be required in the event of his daughter-in-law Lady Jane Grey being proclaimed queen, gave a large sum to Fisher's keeping, which was hidden by him in Bishop's Itchington pool. After the attainder and execution of the Duke in 1553, Fisher was questioned about the money by orders from the queen, but he refused to deliver it up; his fingers were pulled out of joint by the rack.

Fisher represented Warwick in the second parliament of Mary, 1554, and in the first (1554), second (1555), and third (1557-8) of Philip and Mary.

== Under Elizabeth I ==
In 1571, when Robert Dudley, 1st Earl of Leicester, celebrated the Order of St Michael in the collegiate church of Warwick, the bailiff and burgesses of the borough were invited to attend the Earl from the Priory, where he was Fisher's guest for six or seven days; and from there they went in grand procession to the church. Just after the ceremony, at which he had been present, William Parr, marquis of Northampton died suddenly at the Priory.

The following year Elizabeth I paid a sudden visit to the Priory, when returning to Warwick from Kenilworth, on Saturday night, 17 August. She had dined with Fisher's son, Edward, at his house at Itchington on the Monday previously. After supping with Mrs. Fisher and her company, her majesty withdrew for to visiting Fisher, afflicted with gout. He vowed to be on horseback when she travelled on. He attended the queen on her return to Kenilworth and rode in company with Lord Burghley.

== Death ==
Fisher died 12 January 1577, and was buried at the upper end of the north aisle in St Mary's Church, Warwick. His tomb, which bore the recumbent effigies of himself and his first wife Winifred, daughter of William Holt, probably perished in the fire of 1694; it was engraved by Wenceslas Hollar.

Fisher is sometimes mistaken for the John Fisher who compiled the 'Black Book of Warwick.' The latter was in all probability John Fisher, bailiff of Warwick, in 1565.

== Family ==
He married Katherine, daughter of Sir Richard Longe, by whom he had issue, Thomas, John, Dorothy, and Katherine.

His son and heir, Edward Fisher, was thirty years old at the time of his father's death. His inheritance, William Dugdale states, was then worth £3,000 a year, but he soon squandered it, and hastened his ruin by making a fraudulent conveyance to deceive Serjeant John Puckering, to whom in 1581 he sold the Priory and lands adjoining. The serjeant commenced a prosecution against him in the Star Chamber; in which the Earl of Leicester interposed. Fisher ultimately consented that an act of parliament should be made to confirm the estate to Puckering, but being encumbered with debts he was committed to the Fleet Prison, where he spent the rest of his life.
