= Francis Greville (MP for Warwick) =

English Tory politician

Francis Greville (1 July 1667 – 11 October 1710), of the Castle, Warwick, was an English Tory politician who sat in the English and British House of Commons between 1695 and 1710.

Greville was the eldest son of Fulke Greville, 5th Baron Brooke and his wife Sarah Dashwood. He travelled abroad in France, Italy and the Low Countries between 1685 and 1687. On about 26 January 1693, he married Lady Anne Wilmott, daughter and eventual coheiress of John Wilmot, 2nd Earl of Rochester (who was the widow of Henry Baynton).

Greville was returned as Member of Parliament for Warwick at the 1695 English general election. He was appointed Commissioner for rebuilding Warwick in 1695. He did not stand at the 1698 English general election, but was returned unopposed at the two general elections of 1701. He voted on 26 February 1702 for the motion vindicating the Commons’ proceedings in impeaching the Whig ministers. He was returned again at the top of the poll in a contest at Warwick at the 1702 English general election. He was returned for Warwick at the 1705 English general election and voted against the Court candidate for Speaker on 25 October 1705. At the 1708 British general election, he was returned again unopposed as Tory MP for Warwick. He acted several times as teller for the Tories, and opposed the impeachment of Dr Sacheverell in 1710. He was returned again as MP for Warwick at the 1710 British general election.

Just a week after his re-election, Greville suffered an apoplectic fit which ended in convulsions. He died a day later on 11 October 1710 and was buried at St Mary's, Warwick. He and his wife had two sons:

- Fulke Greville, 6th Baron Brooke (1693–1711)
- William Greville, 7th Baron Brooke (1695–1727)

He predeceased his father, and the barony passed direct to his eldest son.

Parliament of England
Preceded by William Colemore; The 5th Lord Digby	MP for Warwick; 1695–1698 with The 5th Lord Digby	Succeeded by Robert Greville; Sir Thomas Wagstaffe
Parliament of England
Preceded by Algernon Greville; Sir Thomas Wagstaffe	MP for Warwick with Sir Thomas Wagstaffe 1701; Algernon Greville 1701–1705; Dodington Greville 1705–1707	Succeeded by Parliament of Great Britain
Parliament of Great Britain
Preceded by Parliament of England	MP for Warwick; 1707–1710 with Dodington Greville	Succeeded by Charles Leigh; Dodington Greville
