= John Fisher (writer) =

Member of the Parliament of England

John Fisher was Town Clerk and bailiff of Warwick and a writer.

He was Town Clerk of Warwick from 1563 to 1590, bailiff for 1564–65 and 1580–81 and steward, auditor and surveyor in 1570.

From 1565 to 1590 he compiled his 'Black Book of Warwick', an intimate log of corporation meetings, ceremonies, lawsuits, and quarrels.

He was elected Member of Parliament for Warwick in 1571, 1572 and 1584. He is sometimes mistaken for his brother Thomas Fisher, also a Member of Parliament for the town.
