= John Butler (died 1572 or 1573) =

English politician

John Butler (1503/4? – 1572 or 1573), of Warwick, was an English politician.

He was a member (MP) of the parliament of England for Warwick in 1558 and 1563. He also served as Bailiff of Warwick in 1555 and was a servant of the Earl of Leicester.
