= Margaret Greville, 6th Baroness Willoughby de Broke =

Margaret Greville, 6th Baroness Willoughby de Broke and de jure 14th Baroness Latimer (c. 1561 – 26 March 1631) was a peeress in the peerage of England.

Margaret Greville was born circa 1561, the youngest daughter of Sir Fulke Greville, Sheriff of Warwick and 4th Baron Willoughby de Broke (1536–1606) and Lady Ann Neville. She married on 29 October 1582 at Alcester Sir Richard Verney (d. 1630). She inherited de jure the title 6th Baroness Willoughby de Broke and 14th Baroness Latimer when her brother Sir Fulke Greville, 1st Baron Brooke and 5th Baron Willoughby de Broke (1554–1628) was murdered by one of his servants. Her brother's senior title of Baron Brooke had been passed on to a cousin who her brother had formally adopted.

On her death on 26 March 1631, her title passed to her son, Greville Verney.

Peerage of England
Preceded by Fulke Greville	Baroness Willoughby de Broke; 1628–1631	Succeeded by Greville Verney
