= Siege of Lichfield =

Coordinates: 52°41′08″N 1°49′50″W

Siege of Lichfield (April 1643)
- Part of the First English Civil War
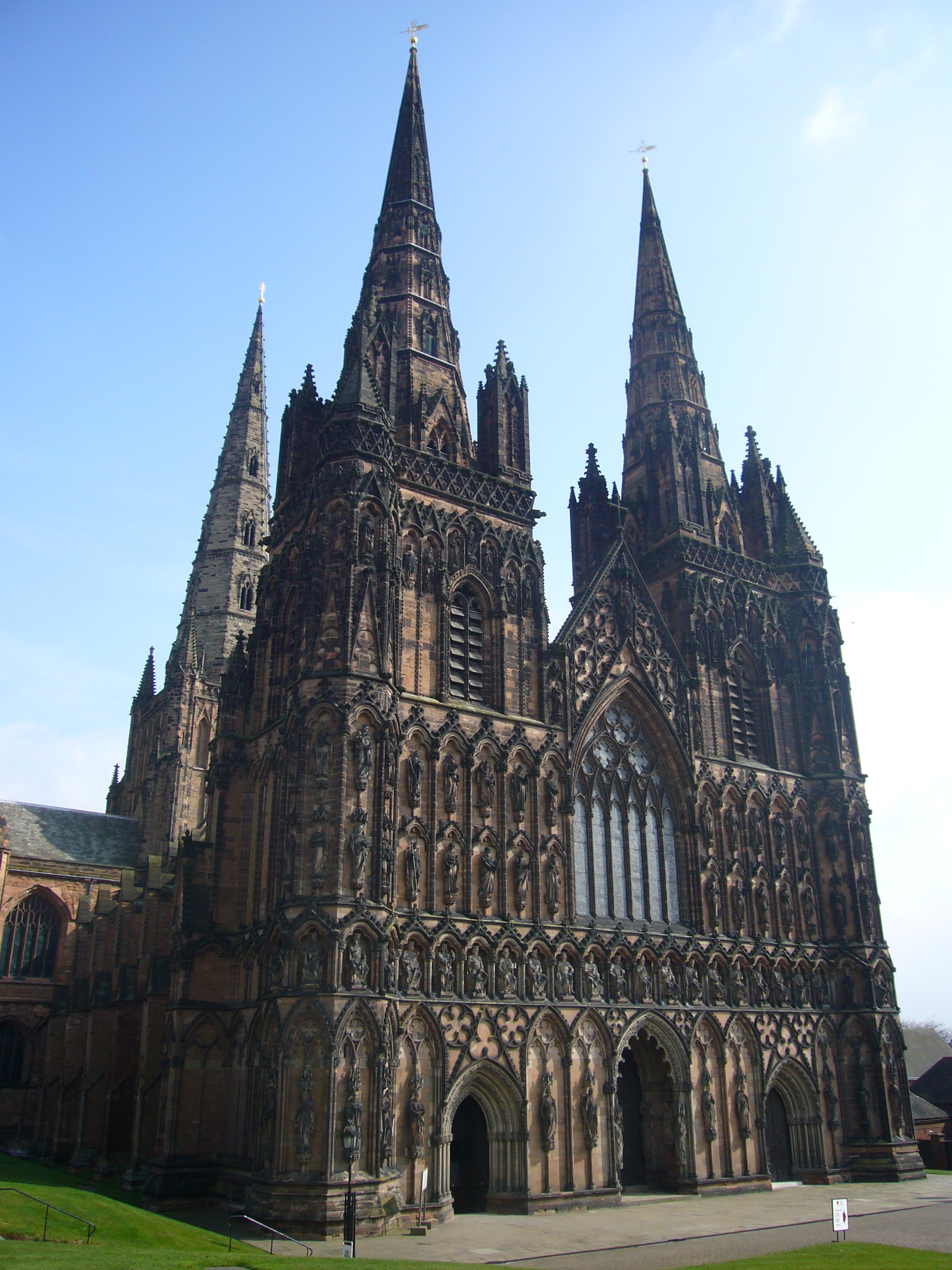
- Lichfield Cathedral at the centre of the Close.
Date	8–21 April 1643
Location	Lichfield
Result	Royalist victory

Belligerents
Royalists	Parliamentarians

Commanders and leaders
Prince Rupert	Colonel Russell (surrendered)

Strength
1,200 horse c.600–700 foot	

Staffordshire County and Lichfield

The siege of Lichfield occurred on 8–21 April 1643 during the First English Civil War. During the military action, the Royalists under the command of Prince Rupert successfully besieged the Parliamentary garrison of Lichfield in Staffordshire under the command of Colonel Russell.

== Prelude ==
Earlier in the war the Royalists had occupied the Cathedral Close, Lichfield; Lord Brooke, at the head of the Warwickshire and Staffordshire levies for Parliament, had besieged and taken the Close; during the siege Lord Brooke had been killed.

King Charles I wanted Lichfield re-taken and turned into a Royal garrison, because the Royalists were in considerable need of ammunition, and their chief supply was drawn from the northern counties. The convoys had, however, to pass through districts sympathetic to Parliament and as:

"the enemy was much superior in all the counties between Yorkshire and Oxford, and had planted garrisons so near all the roads that the most private messengers travelled with great hazard, three being intercepted for one that escaped,"

A Royalist party little inferior in strength to an army was necessary to convoy any supply of ammunition from Yorkshire to Oxford. It was, therefore, resolved to establish a Royalist garrison at Lichfield, thereby forming a centre from which escorts could be sent to convoy whatever was required.

Among the orders given to Rupert for the Lichfield expedition was that he should teach the population of Birmingham a lesson for their disloyalty to the Crown, both for being a manufacturing arsenal for Parliament, and especially for the insults they had put on the King in October, 1642, before the Battle of Edgehill, in plundering the Royal Coach.

Rupert's mission was, therefore, threefold. Punish Birmingham, garrison Lichfield, and clear the country as far as possible. To do this he was given a force of 1,200 horse and dragoons and 600 or 700 foot. He left Oxford on 29 March 1643 via Chipping Norton, Shipston-on-Stour, and Stratford-on-Avon; and was in Henley-in-Arden on Easter Saturday 31 March. He spent Easter Sunday there and then advanced on the unwalled town of Birmingham on Easter Monday. After the Royalist victory at the Battle of Camp Hill, Rupert stayed in Birmingham overnight and on Easter Tuesday, 4 April, he marched to Walsall; and the next day he reached Cannock, where he halted. On Saturday 8 April he marched on to Lichfield.

== Siege ==
Arriving on the 8 April 1643, Rupert at once summoned the city to surrender. Colonel Russell, the governor, sent back the following answer:

"I have heard there is a man who goes by the name of Rupert, who has burnt near four score houses at Birmingham, an act not becoming a gentleman, a Christian, or Englishman, much less a Prince, and that that man has not in all the King's dominion so much as a thatched house; and if this be the same man, I do not intend to deliver the King's places of strength unto him, let him pretend what authority he pleases for the having thereof."

Rupert accordingly began the siege. After a week's work, on Sunday 16 April, the breaches were considered practicable. Rupert ordered the place be assaulted, but the Royalists were repulsed.

The siege was continued until Friday, 21 April, when Rupert again ordered an assault on the place and this time the Royalists took it with a help of an explosive mine — said to have been one of the earliest used in England — blowing up part of the wall of the Close. On this taking place the garrison surrendered on terms.

== Aftermath ==
The Parliamentary garrison was allowed to march out of Lichfield with bag and baggage, and sent under a convoy to the Parliamentary stronghold of Coventry.

Rupert had now completed his task, and took steps to return to Oxford. He did not stay long at Lichfield. The day after the surrender, leaving some of his force to garrison the town, he set out for to Oxford, arriving on 24 April 1643.
