= Caelica =

Caelica or Cælica is a sequence of 110 sonnets and poems by Fulke Greville, Lord Brooke. Martha F. Crow thinks the large part of the poems youthful work composed before 1586, while the last poems in the series (more serious in tone) were written later. The collection includes a variety of verse forms and shows the Italian influence of courtiers like John Florio at the English court. Caelica was published posthumously in Certaine Learned and Elegant Workes (1633).
