= Robert Greville, 2nd Baron Brooke =

English politician, military officer and peer

The Right Honourable The Lord Brooke
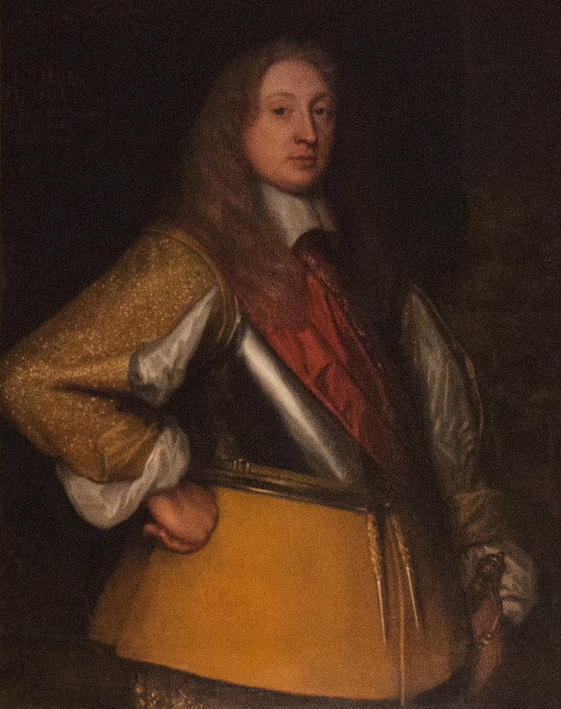

Parliamentarian Commander Staffordshire and Warwickshire
- In office August 1642 – March 1643

Lord Lieutenant of Warwickshire
- In office April 1642 – March 1643

Member of Parliament for Warwick
- In office January 1628 – May 1628

Personal details
- Born: May 1607 Helpringham, Lincolnshire
- Died: 2 March 1643 (aged 35) Lichfield
- Resting place: Collegiate Church of St Mary, Warwick
- Party: Parliamentarian
- Spouse: Catherine Russell (1630–his death)
- Children: Francis (1637–1658), Robert (1638–after 1680) and Fulke (1643–1710)
- Education: Cambridge University
- Occupation: Puritan activist, author and politician

Military service
- Battles/wars: First English Civil War; Relief of Warwick Castle; Brentford; Siege of Lichfield †

Robert Greville, 2nd Baron Brooke (May 1607 – 4 March 1643) was an English politician, military officer and peer. A leading opponent of Charles I of England, when the First English Civil War began in August 1642, he was appointed as the commander of Parliamentarian forces in Staffordshire and Warwickshire. He was killed by a Royalist sniper at the Siege of Lichfield on 2 March 1643.

Greville was adopted at the age of four by his childless distant cousin Fulke Greville, 1st Baron Brooke, inheriting both his title and Warwick Castle in 1628. A religious Independent, he was closely associated with other Puritan opponents of the Stuart regime, including John Pym, John Hampden and Arthur Haselrig. From 1640 to 1642, he and Lord Saye were central to securing support in the House of Lords for legislation passed by the House of Commons.

Although not as famous as Pym and Hampden, both of whom also died in 1643, Greville's death was viewed as a significant loss by his contemporaries. Many initially preferred him as commander of Parliamentarian forces to the Earl of Essex, while his conviction that "true religion" required belief in God, rather than a specific form of worship, prefigured later divisions between Presbyterians and Independents like Oliver Cromwell.

== Personal details ==
Robert Greville was born May 1607 near Helpringham, only surviving son of Fulke Greville (1575–1632), an "obscure Lincolnshire squire", and his wife Mary Copley. His sister Dorothy (1605–1650) married Arthur Haselrig, who was one of the Five Members in January 1642, while Godfrey Bosvile (1596–1658), a half-brother from his mother's first marriage, became a close friend and political associate. Greville's prospects were transformed in 1611 when he was adopted by his childless distant cousin Fulke Greville, 1st Baron Brooke, and inherited his title and Warwick Castle in 1628.

In 1630 he married Catharine (died 1676), daughter of Francis Russell, 4th Earl of Bedford; they had three sons who survived into adulthood, Francis (1637–1658), Robert (1638–after 1680) and Fulke (1643–1710). Most significantly, Catharine took on the responsibility for her children and Warwick Castle after her husband's premature death.

== Education and political opposition ==
Greville received what was then considered a comprehensive education, attending Cambridge University before travelling through Europe from 1624 to 1627. He visited Paris, Venice and Turin but the time spent in the Calvinist centres of Leiden and Geneva seems to have been decisive in instilling his Puritan views. While in Leiden, he is thought to have met John Robinson, an advocate of Puritan colonisation of North America who organised the Mayflower voyage. This may account for his subsequent involvement in the Saybrook Colony and Providence Island Company, of which he became a founder member.

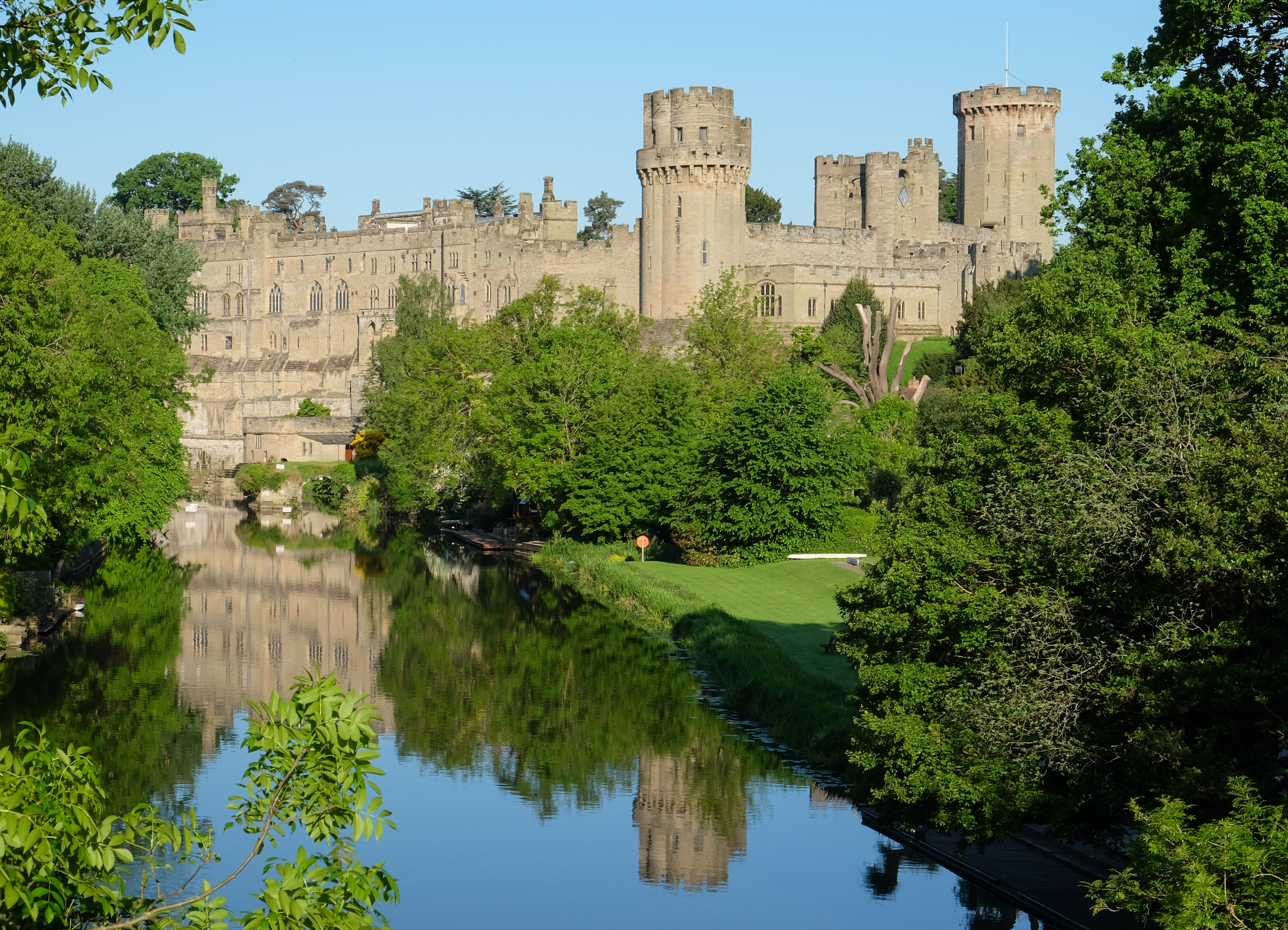
Greville inherited Warwick Castle in 1628

In early 1628, he was elected MP for Warwick, a session dominated by the struggle over the Petition of Right. His election was challenged and voided on 31 May but before a by-election could take place, his adoptive father died on 30 September. Greville inherited his titles and thereafter sat in the House of Lords. Many contemporaries resented his alleged low social origins, while his religious radicalism also set him apart.

Combined with the suspension of Parliament during the 1629 to 1640 period of Personal Rule, the result was minimal involvement in local politics. Instead, he became part of a national network of Puritan activists, whose projects included establishment of the Providence Company in 1630. He reportedly declared his willingness to fund the entire project in return for control, an offer rejected by John Pym, the company treasurer. Although the Providence Island colony never prospered and was captured by the Spanish in May 1641, company meetings provided cover for co-ordinating political opposition. Many members were prominent in the Parliamentary opposition in 1640, including Pym, John Hampden, Francis Rous, Lord Saye and Sir William Waller.

Despair at the political situation of the 1630s led Greville to contemplate emigration along with many others, including Oliver Cromwell. To provide a vehicle for this, he and Lord Saye founded the SayeBrooke colony in 1635, an amalgamation of Lord Saye and Lord Brooke. They dropped the idea when their proposed political constitution was rejected by John Winthrop of Massachusetts, who insisted only full church members be allowed to vote. Concern over the potential for religious tyranny led Saye and Brooke to reject clerical involvement in civil affairs, the origin of the subsequent split between Presbyterians such as Pym and religious Independents like Cromwell.

== Wars of the Three Kingdoms ==
Greville's England; key locations 1642 to 1643

At the outbreak of the Bishops' Wars in 1639, Greville and Lord Saye were briefly imprisoned at York for refusing to support the war. Greville was suspected of being in secret contact with the Covenanters and there may have been some truth to this; he was appointed by Parliament to negotiate with the victorious Scots, which resulted in the Treaty of Ripon and elections for the Long Parliament in November. He organised support in the Lords for legislation passed by Pym in the Commons, including the impeachment of Archbishop William Laud and execution of Strafford in May 1641.

Political tensions came to a head with the outbreak of the Irish Rebellion of 1641; Charles and Parliament both supported raising an army to suppress it but feared it would be used against them first. Appointed Lord Lieutenant of Warwickshire in April 1642, Greville began recruiting men and securing weapons at Warwick Castle; in June, Parliament made him commander of troops recruited for Ireland but the First English Civil War began in August. He used his contacts in the City of London to raise the funding which proved crucial in enabling Parliament to survive the first months of the war.

Appointed Parliamentarian commander in Staffordshire and Warwickshire, on 23 August Greville repulsed an attempt by the Earl of Northampton to capture Warwick Castle. He raised a regiment which fought at Edgehill in October; although absent on that occasion, he helped repulse the Royalist advance on London at Brentford in November. After he and Sir John Gell secured Stratford-upon-Avon in February 1643, they moved onto Lichfield; on 2 March, Greville was killed by a sniper. He was buried in the Collegiate Church of St Mary, Warwick.

Greville's death was a serious blow, not least because his energy and commitment to defeating Charles militarily meant many viewed him as a better choice than the Earl of Essex, the current Parliamentarian commander. In addition, his successor in the East Midlands was Sir John Gell, a man whose propensity for feuding and aggressiveness made him unpopular even among his own supporters. According to Puritan diarist Lucy Hutchinson, Gell "had not understanding to judge the equity of the cause, nor piety, nor holiness", while his men were "the most licentious, ungovernable wretches that belonged to the Parliament".

== Political, philosophical and religious views ==
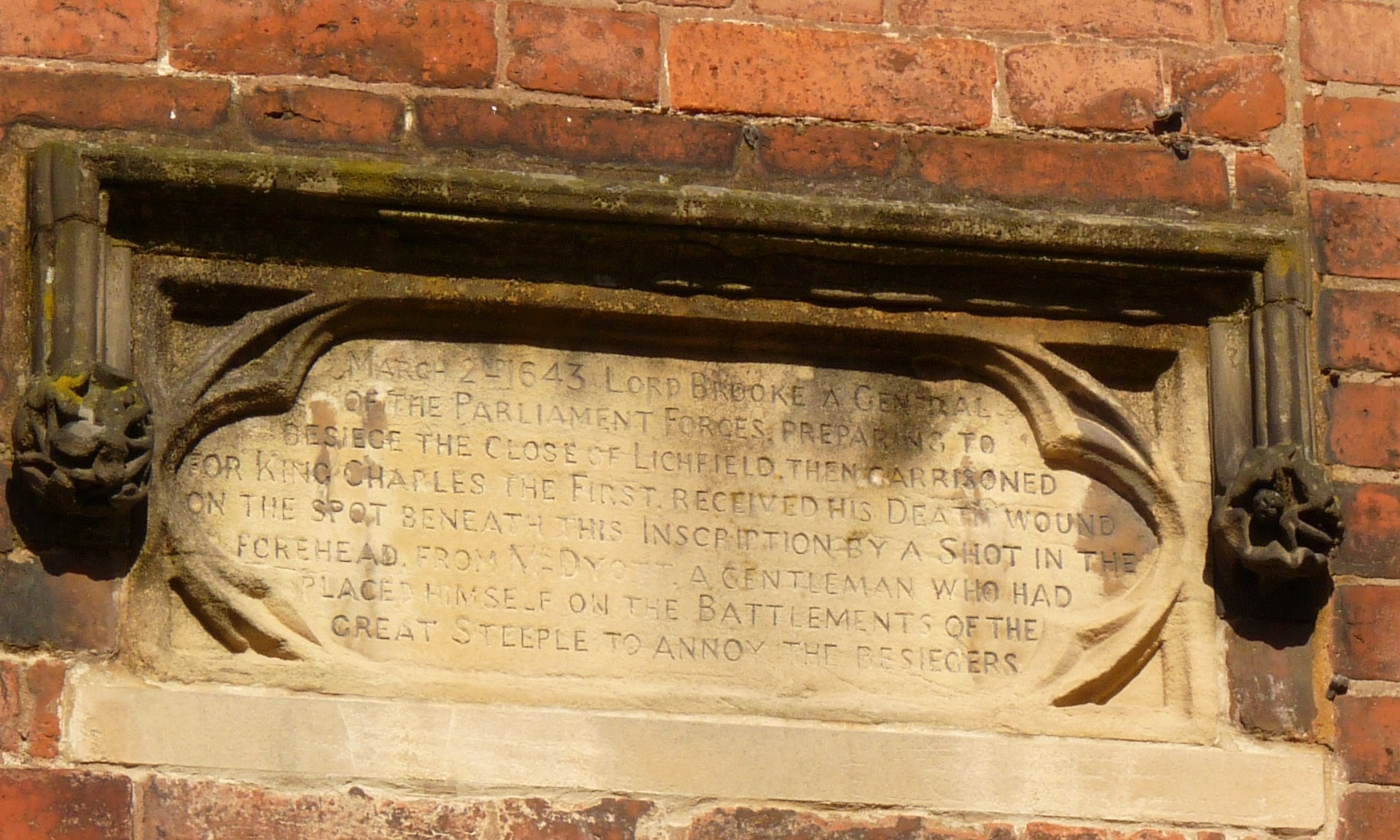
Plaque in Dam St, Lichfield commemorating Greville's death

Despite a well-deserved reputation for religious radicalism, Brooke supported ministers with a wide range of views, including mainstream members of the Church of England. His writings advocated educational reform and tolerance for different religious views, so long as they were Protestant. In The Nature of Truth published in 1640, Greville argued while truth required a belief in God, it could take a variety of forms and no one should be compelled to worship against their conscience or reason. This was the derivation of his opposition to the concept of an established church.

In a speech made in February 1643, Greville anticipated Cromwell in urging Parliament to resist hiring mercenaries or professionals in favour of those who "fought for the sake of the cause". Those recruited into his own regiment included Levellers like John Lilburne and Alex Tulidah, as well as radical republican and regicide John Okey.

Greville was a Neoplatonist who influenced the later Cambridge Platonists.

== Sources ==
- Burke, Sir Bernard (1938). Burke's Peerage, Baronetage and Knightage. Shaw.
- Duinen, Jared, van (2007). The Nature of Puritan Opposition in 1630s England in "Prosopography Approaches" and Applications: A Handbook. University of Oxford Linacre College Unit for Prosopographical Research. ISBN 978-1900934121.
- Hibbert, Christopher (1993). Cavaliers and Roundheads; the English at war 1642-1649 (1994 ed.). Harper Collins. ISBN 978-0586090084.
- Hughes, Ann (2004). "Greville, Robert, second Baron Brooke of Beauchamps Court". Oxford Dictionary of National Biography (online ed.). Oxford University Press. doi:10.1093/ref:odnb/11518. (Subscription, Wikipedia Library access or UK public library membership required.)
- Hunneyball, Paul (2010). GREVILLE, Robert (1607-1643), of Beauchamp's Court, Alcester, Warwickshire in The History of Parliament: the House of Commons 1604-1629. CUP.
- Hutton, Ronald (2003). The Royalist War Effort 1642-1646. Routledge. ISBN 978-0415305402.
- Kupperman, Karen Ordahl (1993). Providence Island 1630-1641: The Other Puritan Colony. Cambridge University Press. ISBN 978-0521558358.
- Milton, John (1644). Areopagitica, A Speech of Mr. John Milton for the Liberty of Unlicenc'd Printing to the Parliament of England.
- Wedgwood, C.V. (1958). The King's War, 1641–1647 (1983 ed.). Penguin Classics. ISBN 978-0-14-006991-4.

Parliament of England
Preceded by Sir Francis Leigh, Bt; Francis Lucy	Member of Parliament for Warwick; 1628; With: Francis Lucy	Succeeded by Anthony Stoughton; Francis Lucy
Peerage of England
Preceded by Fulke Brooke	Baron Brooke; 1628–1643	Succeeded by Francis Brooke
