= William Combe (died 1610) =

English politician

William Combe (1551–1610), of Middle Temple, London and Warwick, was an English politician.

== Life ==
He was the posthumous younger son of John Combe (d. 1650) of Stratford-upon-Avon, Warws. by Jane, daughter of John Wheeler of Droitwich, Worcs. In 1554 his mother married Thomas Lewkenor of Alvechurch, Worcs., a servant of Nicholas Heath, the Catholic Bishop of Worcester. He had strong Catholic associations through his mother and his elder brother John Combe was classed as an adversary of the Protestant religion in 1564, although Combe himself conformed to the Elizabethan Religious Settlement.

He was admitted to the Middle Temple from the New Inn in October 1571 and was called to the bar in February 1589.

It was presumably due to his association with the Sheldons, that he became MP for Droitwich in 1589. He represented Warwick in 1593, by which time he was acquiring property in the town and may have already been working as legal counsel for the borough. In 1597 he was chosen as the junior Knight of the shire for Warwickshire.

== Family ==
He may initially have been married to a daughter of his step-father Thomas Lewkenor by his first marriage. He subsequently married Alice, daughter of Richard Hanbury of London. By 1599 he had married Jane, widow of Sir John Puckering. At the time of his death he had no surviving children.
