= Sir Fulke Greville =

English gentleman

Arms of Greville: Sable, on a cross engrailed or five pellets a bordure engrailed of the second

Sir Fulke Greville (1536 – 15 November 1606) of Beauchamp Court near Alcester in Warwickshire, was an English gentleman.

== Origins ==
He was born in 1536, the son of Sir Fulke Greville (d. 10 November 1559) by his wife Elizabeth Willoughby, 3rd Baroness Willoughby de Broke (d.1562), grand daughter and heiress of Robert Willoughby, 2nd Baron Willoughby de Broke, the wealthiest heiress of her time.

== Inheritance ==
His mother Elizabeth Willoughby survived her sisters, who had no children. By modern law, this would mean that she would have become suo jure Baroness Willoughby de Broke (and Baroness Latimer), both ancient titles created by writ and thus able to pass to females. Thus her son Fulk Greville would in turn have inherited from her as 4th Baron Willoughby de Broke and 12th Baron Latimer but this right was not established in law until 1696, by his great-grandson, the 11th Baron Willoughby de Broke.

== Marriage and children ==
In 1553 he married Anne Neville (d.1583), a daughter of Ralph Neville, 4th Earl of Westmorland, a distant cousin. They had the following children:

- Fulke Greville, 1st Baron Brooke and 5th Baron Willoughby de Broke
- Margaret Greville (1561–1631/2), who married Sir Richard Verney, High Sheriff of Warwickshire in 1572.
- Sconalate Greville,(abt. 1575-1608), married Walter Bassett 27th November 1586.

== Life, death and succession ==
Educated at Shrewsbury, Greville was treasurer of the Navy until April 1604, and was keen on falconry. In 1602 one of the falcons was found at Seaton in Devonshire. Its silver rings were engraved with Greville's name and the device of the stern of a ship. On his death on 15 November 1606 at Beauchamp Court near Alcester, his estate (including any claim to the titles) passed to his eldest son, Fulke Greville, 1st Baron Brooke and 5th Baron Willoughby de Broke. After the murder of his son in 1628, they passed to his daughter Margaret Greville, 6th Baroness Willoughby de Broke, wife of Sir Richard Verney of Compton Verney in Warwickshire.

== Footnotes ==
Peerage of England
Preceded by Elizabeth Greville nee Willoughby	Baron Willoughby de Broke; 1560–1606	Succeeded by Fulke Greville
