= Thomas Lewknor (MP for Midhurst) =

16th-century English politician

Thomas Lewknor (c. 1538 – July 1596), of Tangmere; later of Selsey, Sussex, was an English politician.

He was born the eldest son of Edmund Lewknor of Tangmere and the brother of Richard Lewknor. He was educated at the Middle Temple.

He held a number of public commissions and was elected a member (MP) of the parliament of England for Midhurst in 1586.

He married twice;firstly Bridget, the daughter of John Lewes of Selsey, with whom he had 5 sons, including Lewes Lewknor and Samuel Lewkenor His second wife was Anne, the daughter of Richard Hill, serjeant of the cellar to Henry VIII and the widow of John Bellingham of Eringham.
