= Fulke Greville, 1st Baron Brooke =

English poet, dramatist, and statesman (1554–1628)

The Right Honourable The Lord Brooke KB PC
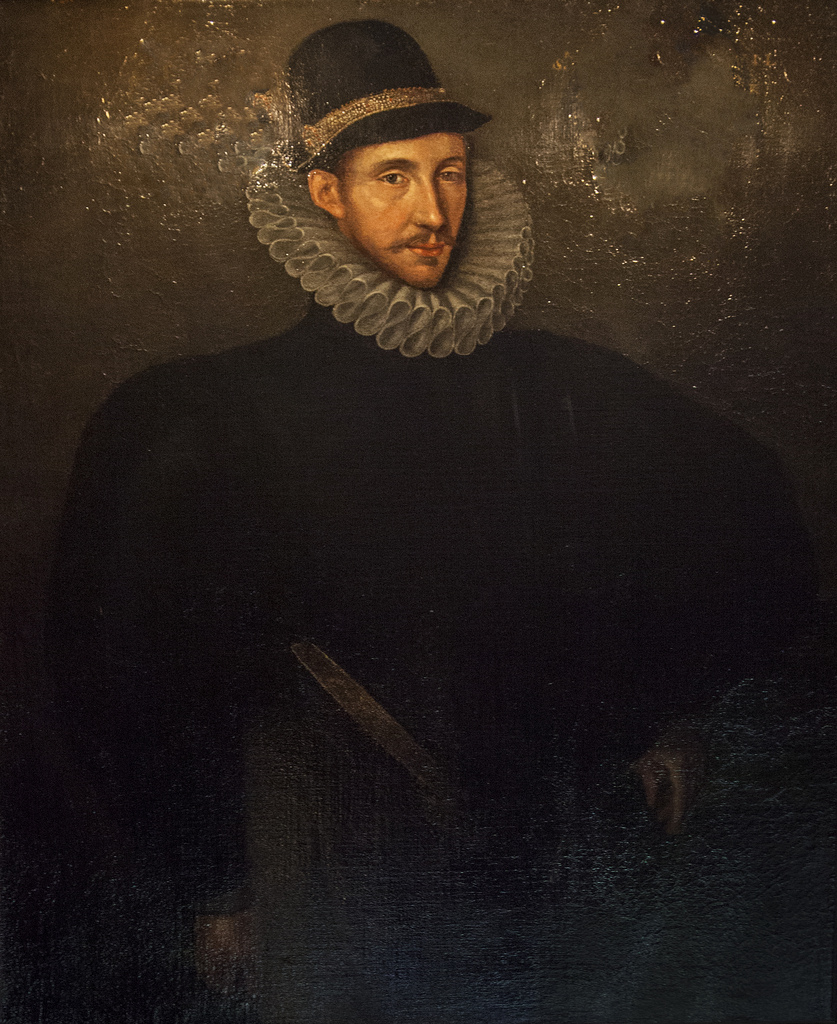
- Portrait by Edmund Lodge

Chancellor of the Exchequer
- In office 1614–1621
- Preceded by: Sir Julius Caesar
- Succeeded by: Sir Richard Weston

Personal details
- Born: 3 October 1554 Beauchamp's Court, Alcester
- Died: 30 September 1628 (age 73) Brook House, Holborn, London
- Resting place: St Mary's Church, Warwick
- Parents: Sir Fulke Greville (father); Anne Neville (mother)
- Education: Shrewsbury School, Jesus College, Cambridge

Fulke Greville, 1st Baron Brooke (Note: De jure, 13th Baron Latimer and 5th Baron Willoughby de Broke KB and PC, known before 1621 as Sir Fulke Greville.) (/fʊlk ˈɡrɛvɪl/; 3 October 1554 – 30 September 1628) was an Elizabethan poet, dramatist, and statesman who served in the House of Commons at various times between 1581 and 1621, when he was raised to the peerage.

Greville was a capable administrator who served the English Crown under Elizabeth I and James I as, successively, treasurer of the navy, chancellor of the exchequer, and commissioner of the Treasury, and who for his services was in 1621 made Baron Brooke, peer of the realm. Greville was granted Warwick Castle in 1604, making numerous improvements. Greville is best known today as the biographer of Sir Philip Sidney, and for his sober poetry, which presents dark and thoughtful views on art, literature, beauty and other philosophical matters.

== Life ==
Fulke Greville, born 3 October 1554, at Beauchamp Court, near Alcester, Warwickshire, was the only son of Sir Fulke Greville (1536–1606) and Anne Neville (d. 1583), the daughter of Ralph Neville, 4th Earl of Westmorland. He was the grandson of Sir Fulke Greville (d. 10 November 1559) and Elizabeth Willoughby (buried 15 November 1562), eldest daughter of Robert Willoughby, 2nd Baron Willoughby de Broke, the only other child of the marriage was a daughter, Margaret Greville (1561–1631/2), who married Sir Richard Verney.

He was sent in 1564, on the same day as his lifelong friend, Philip Sidney, to Shrewsbury School. He then went up to Jesus College, Cambridge in 1568.

Sir Henry Sidney, Philip's father, and president of the Council of Wales and the Marches, gave Greville in 1576 a post connected with the court of the Welsh Marches, but Greville resigned it in 1577 to go to attend the court of Queen Elizabeth I along with Philip Sidney. There, Greville became a great favourite with the Queen, who valued his sober character and administrative skills. In 1581, he was elected in a by-election as Member of Parliament for Southampton. Queen Elizabeth made him secretary to the principality of Wales in 1583. However, he was put out of favour more than once for leaving the country against her wishes.

In 1581 at a Whitehall tournament in honour of French ambassadors Greville, Philip Sidney, Philip Howard Earl of Arundel and Frederick Lord Windsor staged an entertainment as the "Four Foster Children of Desire". The ambassadors were working on plans for Elizabeth's marriage to Francis, Duke of Anjou. The "Foster Children" laid siege to the "Fortress of Perfect Beautie". After two days of challenges the Children admitted defeat. The entertainment was understood to convey the idea that Elizabeth was unattainable, devised by the opposition to the French marriage.

Greville, Philip Sidney and Sir Edward Dyer were members of the "Areopagus", the literary clique which, under the leadership of Gabriel Harvey, supported the introduction of classical metres into English verse. Sidney and Greville arranged to sail with Sir Francis Drake in 1585 in his expedition against the Spanish West Indies, but Elizabeth forbade Drake to take them with him, and also refused Greville's request to be allowed to join Robert Dudley's army in the Netherlands. Philip Sidney, who took part in the campaign, was killed on 17 October 1586. Greville memorialized his beloved friend in A Dedication to Sir Philip Sidney.

Greville participated in the Battle of Coutras in 1587. About 1591 Greville served further for a short time in Normandy under King Henry III of Navarre in the French Wars of Religion. This was his last experience of war.

Greville represented Warwickshire in parliament in 1592–1593, 1597, 1601 and 1621. In 1598 he was made Treasurer of the Navy, and he retained the office through the early years of the reign of James I.

Greville was granted Warwick Castle—situated on a bend of the River Avon in Warwickshire—by King James I in 1604. The castle was in a dilapidated condition when he took possession of it, and he spent £20,000 to restore it.

In 1614 he became chancellor and under-treasurer of the exchequer, and throughout the reign, he was a valued supporter of James I, although in 1615 he advocated the summoning of Parliament. In 1618 he became commissioner of the treasury, and in 1621 he was raised to the peerage with the title of Baron Brooke, a title which had belonged to the family of his paternal grandmother.

== Death ==
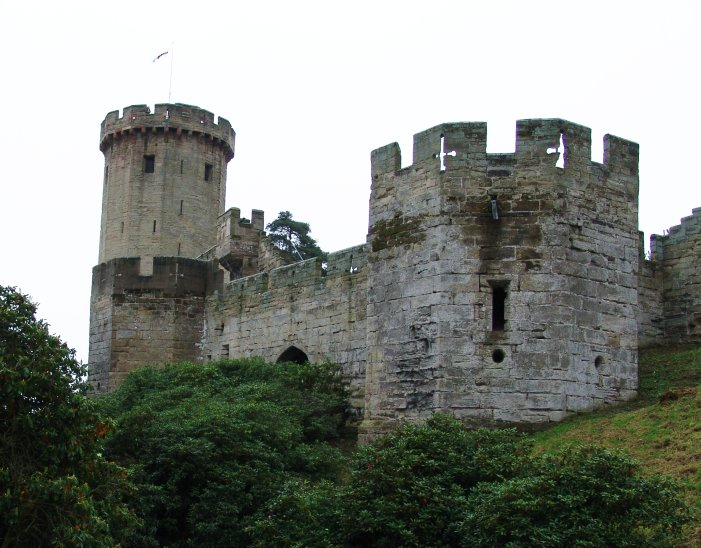
Warwick Castle on River Avon in October 2004.

On 1 September 1628 Greville was stabbed at his house in Holborn, London, by Ralph Haywood, a servant who believed that he had been cheated by being left out of his master's will. Haywood then turned the knife on himself. Greville's physicians treated his wounds by filling them with pig fat. Rather than disinfecting them, the pig fat turned rancid and infected the wounds, and he died in agony four weeks after the attack. Greville's body was brought back to Warwick and he was buried in the Collegiate Church of St Mary, Warwick. On his tomb was inscribed the following epitaph that he had composed:

Fulke Greville

Servant to Queene Elizabeth

Conceller to King James

and Frend to Sir Philip Sidney.

Trophaeum Peccati.

Trophaeum Peccatti has been translated variously, including as 'monument of sin' or 'a trophy commemorating sin's victory.' It is unclear what specifically he is referring to.

== Legacy ==
- Greville has numerous streets named after him in the Hatton Garden area of Holborn, London (see Hatton Garden#Street names etymologies).
- The English female given name 'Myra' was invented by him.
- A line from Chorus Sacerdotum from Mustapha is quoted by Christopher Hitchens in his book Letters to a Young Contrarian.
- In 2018, the first-ever festival dedicated to Greville was launched in his home town, Alcester, Warwickshire.

== Works ==
Arms of Greville: Sable, on a cross engrailed or five pellets a bordure engrailed of the second

Greville is best known for his biography of Sidney (composed c. 1610–1612), which circulated in manuscript with the title A Dedication to Sir Philip Sidney. It was published in 1652 as The Life of the Renowned Sir Philip Sidney. (Note: The complete title of the first octavo edition reads: The Life of the Renowned Sr. Philip Sidney. With the true Interest of England as it then stood in relation to all Forrain Princes: And particularly for suppressing the power of Spain Stated by Him: His principall Actions, Counsels, Designes, and Death. Together with a short account of the Maximes and Policies used by Queen Elizabeth in her Government.) He includes some autobiographical matter in what amounts to a treatise on government.

Greville's poetry consists of closet tragedies, sonnets, and poems on political and moral subjects. His style is grave and sententious.

Greville's works include:

Biography

- A Dedication to Sir Philip Sidney

Closet drama

- Alaham
- Mustapha

Verse poems

- Caelica in CX Sonnets
- Of Monarchy
- A Treatise of Religion
- A Treatie of Humane Learning
- An Inquisition upon Fame and Honour
- A Treatie of Warres

Miscellaneous prose

- a letter to an "Honourable Lady",
- a letter to Grevill Varney in France,
- a short speech delivered on behalf of Francis Bacon

=== Editions ===
Greville's works were collected and reprinted by Alexander Balloch Grosart, in 1870, in four volumes. Poetry and Drama of Fulke Greville, edited by Geoffrey Bullough, was published in 1938. The Prose Works of Fulke Greville, edited by John Gouws, were published in 1986. The Selected Poems of Fulke Greville edited by Thom Gunn, with an afterword by Bradin Cormack, was published in 2009 (University of Chicago Press, ISBN 978-0-226-30846-3.)

- The Tragedy of Mustapha (London: Printed by J. Windet for N. Butter, 1609)
- Certaine Learned and Elegant Workes (London: Printed by E. Purslowe for H. Seyle, 1633); comprises A Treatise of Humane Learning, An Inquisition upon Fame and Honour, A Treatise of Wars, Alaham, Mustapha, Caelica, A Letter to an Honorable Lady, and A Letter of Travel
- The Remains of Sir Fvlk Grevill Lord Brooke: Being Poems of Monarchy and Religion: Never Before Printed (London: Printed by T. N. for H. Herringman, 1670); comprises A Treatise of Monarchy and A Treatise of Religion
- Poems and Dramas of Fulke Greville, First Lord Brooke, 2 volumes, edited by Geoffrey Bullough (Edinburgh: Oliver & Boyd, 1939; New York: Oxford University Press, 1945); comprises Caelica, A Treatise of Humane Learning, An Inquisition upon Fame and Honor, A Treatise of Wars, Mustapha, and Alaham
- The Remains: Being Poems of Monarchy and Religion, edited by G. A. Wilkes (London: Oxford University Press, 1965); comprises A Treatise of Monarchy and A Treatise of Religion
- The Prose Works Fulke Greville, Lord Brooke, edited by John Guows (Oxford: Oxford University Press, 1997), published as part of the Oxford English Texts series; a scholarly edition of his prose works, with an authoritative text, together with an introduction, commentary notes, and scholarly apparatus

The principal repository for Fulke Greville's papers is the British Library (Add MSS 54566-54571, the Warwick Manuscripts; letters in the as-yet uncatalogued Earl Cowper mss.). Individual manuscripts of the Dedication to Sir Philip Sidney are to be found at the Bodleian Library, Oxford (a manuscript formerly owned by Dr. B. E. Juel-Jensen); Trinity College, Cambridge (MSS R.7.32 and 33); and the Shrewsbury Library (MS 295).

== Critical reception ==
Charles Lamb commented on Greville: "He is nine parts Machiavel and Tacitus, for one of Sophocles and Seneca... Whether we look into his plays or his most passionate love-poems, we shall find all frozen and made rigid with intellect." He goes on to speak of the obscurity of expression that runs through all of Greville's poetry.

Andrea McCrea sees the influence of Justus Lipsius in the Letter to an Honourable Lady, but elsewhere detects a scepticism more akin to Michel de Montaigne.

A rhyming elegy on Greville, published in Henry Huth's Inedited Poetical Miscellanies, brings charges of miserliness against him.

Robert Pinsky has asserted that this work is comparable in force of imagination to John Donne.

== Family ==
Lord Brooke, who never married, left no natural heirs, and his senior (Brooke) barony passed to his cousin and adopted son, Robert Greville (1608–1643), who took the side of Parliament in the English Civil War, and defeated the Royalists in a skirmish at Kineton in August 1642. Robert was killed during the siege of Lichfield on 2 March 1643, having survived the elder Greville by only fifteen years. His other barony (Willoughby de Broke) was inherited by his sister Margaret who married Sir Richard Verney.

Greville planned for a shared tomb with his lifelong friend, Philip Sidney.

== See also ==
- Canons of Elizabethan poetry
- List of owners of Warwick Castle

== Sources ==
- Gouws, John (2004). "Greville, Fulke, first Baron Brooke of Beauchamps Court (1554–1628)". Oxford Dictionary of National Biography (online ed.). Oxford University Press. doi:10.1093/ref:odnb/11516. (Subscription, Wikipedia Library access or UK public library membership required.)
- Richardson, Douglas (2011). Everingham, Kimball G. (ed.). Magna Carta Ancestry: A Study in Colonial and Medieval Families. Vol. I (2nd ed.). Salt Lake City. ISBN 978-1449966379.
- Richardson, Douglas (2011). Everingham, Kimball G. (ed.). Magna Carta Ancestry: A Study in Colonial and Medieval Families. Vol. II (2nd ed.). Salt Lake City. ISBN 978-1449966386.
- Saunders, A W L (2007). Master of Shakespeare. MoS Publishing Ltd. ISBN 978-9768212115. Archived from the original on 26 November 2012.
- Elliott, Ward E. Y.; Valenza, Robert J. (2004). "Oxford by the Numbers: What Are the Odds That the Earl of Oxford Could Have Written Shakespeare's Poems and Plays?" (PDF). Tennessee Law Review. 72 (1): 323–452. ISSN 0040-3288. Archived from the original (PDF) on 20 October 2020.
- "Greville, Fulke" . Dictionary of National Biography. London: Smith, Elder & Co. 1885–1900.

Parliament of England
| Preceded by Sir Henry Wallop; Nicholas Caplyn | Member of Parliament for Southampton; 1581–1584; With: Nicholas Caplyn | Succeeded by Thomas Digges; Thomas Godard |
| Preceded by Sir Thomas Lucy; George Digby | Member of Parliament for Warwickshire; 1587–1601; With: Sir John Harington 1587; Richard Verney 1589; Edward Greville 1593; William Combe 1597; Sir Robert Digby 1601 | Succeeded by Sir Edward Greville; Sir Richard Verney |
| Preceded by Sir Thomas Lucy; Sir Richard Verney | Member of Parliament for Warwickshire; 1621; With: Sir Thomas Lucy | Succeeded by Sir Thomas Lucy; Sir Francis Leigh |
Honorary titles
| Preceded by The Earl of Leicester | Custos Rotulorum of Warwickshire bef. 1594 – aft. 1596 | Succeeded by Sir Thomas Leigh |
| Preceded by Sir Thomas Leigh | Custos Rotulorum of Warwickshire; 1626–1628 | Succeeded by The Earl of Denbigh |
Political offices
| Preceded by Sir John Hawkins | Treasurer of the Navy; 1598–1604 | Succeeded by Sir Robert Mansell |
| Preceded by Sir Julius Caesar | Chancellor of the Exchequer; 1614–1621 | Succeeded by Sir Richard Weston |
Peerage of England
| New title | Baron Brooke; 1621–1628 | Succeeded by Robert Greville |
| Preceded by Fulke Greville | Baron Willoughby de Broke de jure Baron Latimer; 1606–1628 | Succeeded by Margaret Verney |
