= John Allerwich =

English politician

John Allerwich was an English politician who was MP for Warwick in 1395. History of Parliament Online claims that this person was probably the Warton, Warwickshire tax collector of the same name recorded in 1413.
