= Roger Wootton =

British aeronautical engineer

Roger Wootton

Leslie Roger Wootton (29 June 1944 – 5 July 2017) was a British aeronautical engineer and balloonist. He was dean of engineering for City University and in 1966 prepared a report on the aircraft maintenance industry for the British Civil Aviation Authority.
