= John Weston (died c. 1433) =

English politician

John Weston (died c. 1433), of Coventry, Worcester and Warwick, was an English politician.

He was a Member (MP) of the Parliament of England for Warwick in January 1404, 1406, 1410 and 1411, for Worcester in 1410, May 1413, November 1414, 1415 and 1419, and for Worcestershire in 1420.
