= Francis Leigh, 1st Earl of Chichester =

English politician (1598–1653)

Francis Leigh, 1st Earl of Chichester ( 28 April 1598 – 21 December 1653) was a Royalist politician and courtier around the period of the English Civil War.

His father was Sir Francis Leigh; his mother was Mary, daughter of Thomas Egerton, 1st Viscount Brackley. He was born, and eventually buried, on the family estate at Newnham Regis, Warwickshire. In 1613 Leigh attended Oxford University and was admitted to Lincoln's Inn two years later.

Coinciding with his fortuitous second marriage, he was knighted by 1618, and was created a baronet by the King on 24 December 1618. In 1625-6 parliament he was elected MP for Warwick. He remained close to Lord Brooke and, under King Charles I, was himself raised to the peerage as Baron Dunsmore in the County of Warwick on 31 July 1628, with remainder failing heirs male to grantee's body, to his stepson John Anderson, PC.

He opposed the King during the 1640 Short Parliament and actively campaigned for the summoning of the second (Long) parliament later that year. Despite this, he was appointed to meet the Scottish commissioners at Ripon in autumn 1640 and his opposition was further softened by both the militancy of the King's enemies and personal encouragement from Charles. His appointment as a privy councillor confirmed to all his defection to Charles' side. In March 1642 he was one of five lords to protest against the Militia Ordinance. At the commencement of the First English Civil War, he financed a Royalist troop of forty horse, and was Colonel of the Royalist Cavalry.

In August 1642 his Warwickshire estate was looted by Parliament forces from Coventry (ironically, under the command of the new Lord Brooke). In 1643 he succeeded The Earl of Salisbury as Captain of the Honourable Band of Gentlemen Pensioners. On 3 June 1644 the King further rewarded his loyalty creating him Earl of Chichester, with remainder to his son-in-law, Thomas Wriothesley, Earl of Southampton. He was Captain of the Gentleman Pensioners, 1644–46.

He was a negotiator for Charles with the Parliamentary side at Uxbridge in February 1645. Later that year he was on the commission appointed to govern Oxford during the king's absence.

In November 1645 he was assessed to contribute £3,000 ( a figure comparable to his pre-war yearly income) by the Committee for the Advance of Money and given a year to pay. By January 1647 he had paid £1,000 and given security for £1847 more so his sequestration was suspended. Under the Ordnance of 30 October 1646 parliament annulled the honours granted to him from 20 May 1642. And finally, in 1650, the committee for compounding assessed a fine of £3,594 on him. Leigh died at Apps Court in Walton-on-Thames, Surrey in 1653.

== Family ==
He married twice, and within a year his first wife, 31 July 1617, Susan Banning née Northam, died childless. His second marriage, (settlement 20 Jan. 1618), to Audrey, widow of Sir Francis Anderson (d. 22 Dec. 1616) of Stratton, Beds., daughter of John Boteler, 1st Baron Boteler of Bramfield by Elizabeth Villiers, and niece of James I's favourite, George Villiers, 1st Duke of Buckingham. The couple had two daughters.

His eldest daughter, Lady Elizabeth Leigh, married Thomas Wriothesley, 4th Earl of Southampton who inherited the Earldom of Chichester on Leigh's death. Their only child, Lady Elizabeth Wriothesley, would marry Joceline Percy, 11th Earl of Northumberland.

His second daughter, Mary, married George Villiers, 4th Viscount Grandison. Their granddaughter, Harriet Villiers, was the mother of Pitt the Elder.

== Notes ==
Political offices
Preceded by The Earl of Salisbury	Captain of the Honourable Band of Gentlemen Pensioners; 1643–1644?	Succeeded by The Earl of Salisbury
Preceded by The Earl of Denbigh	Custos Rotulorum of Warwickshire; 1643–1646	Interregnum
Peerage of England
New creation	Earl of Chichester; 1644–1653	Succeeded by Thomas Wriothesley
New creation	Baron Dunsmore; 1628–1653	Extinct
Baronetage of England
New creation	Baronet (of Newnham); 1618–1653	Extinct
