= Thomas Lewknor (MP for Ripon) =

16th-century English politician

Thomas Lewknor (by 1529 – will proven 1571), of Alvechurch, Worcestershire, was an English politician.

== Life ==
He was the son of Richard Lewknor, a younger son of a prominent gentry family in Sussex and his wife Joan, daughter of Richard Mascall of Lindfield, West Sussex. He entered the service of Nicholas Heath, Bishop of Worcester and settled in Worcestershire, where he acquired the manor of Alvechurch.

Following Heath's promotion to be Archbishop of York, Lewknor was added to the commission of sewers for that county and represented Ripon in the parliament of 1558. His public employment ended after the accession of Elizabeth I and in 1564 he was listed as an adversary of Protestantism.

== Family ==
He married:

1. Bennett, daughter of Thomas Chaloner of Lindfield, the mother of his children.
2. Jane daughter of John Wheeler of Droitwich, Worcs. and widow of John Combe of Stratford-upon-Avon in 1554. William Combe was his stepson and may have also been his son-in-law.

On his death Alvechurch passed to his son Nicholas, who died without heir, and then to his daughter Jane.
