= Samuel Lewkenor =

- Born: bap. 3rd Nov. 1571; Selsey, Sussex
- Died: c.1614
- Education: Winchester College
- Occupation(s): Soldier, courtier, M.P., author,
- Known for: A discourse not altogether unprofitable, nor unpleasant for such as are desirous to know the situation and customes of forraine cities without travelling to see them : Containing a discourse of all those citties wherein doe flourish at this day priviledged universities. (1600)

Samuel Lewknor (c.1571–1615, also spelled Lewkenor) was an English courtier, M.P. and travel writer. He was the sixth son of Thomas Lewkenor of Tangmere, Sussex and Bridget, daughter of John Lewes of Selsey, Sussex. He was the younger brother to Sir Lewes Lewkenor who was also a soldier, courtier and author and served James I as his Master of the Ceremonies. Sometime after 1601 Samuel married Jane Hopton who was buried on 14th Jan. 1611. Samuel attended Winchester College.

During the early 1590s, Samuel travelled on the continent "without his father’s privity or liking", visiting many of the great universities, on which he would later publish a book. He served as a soldier in the Netherlands and worked as a spy for Sir Robert Cecil. During the Hesketh Plot, he lodged in Prague with Hesketh's messenger: "Abraham hath taken a new guest at my request, one Mr. Samuel Lukenor, a very proper gentleman, he is an Essex man". He was Cecil's instrument in planting a forged letter purporting to be from William Stanley to the plotter Richard Hesketh.

Samuel returned from his travels in 1594 and was with his brother, Lewes, in September, lodging in Egham near the court at Windsor Castle. Lewes wrote to Cecil on his behalf, "This bearer, my brother, newly arrived in these parts from Bohemia, is one that ever desireth humbly to rest at your LL’s service and commandment, and the rather because it pleased your LL to deal so honestly with him in his absence by delivering a letter of his to me. I doubt not his behaviour there hath been such as becomes a good subject, but he will give a reckoning of himself. Egham, 2 Sept. 1594."

In his preface to his Discourse on Universities (1600) Samuel claimed to be "one that hath more usually been acquainted with the warlike sound of martial drums than with the schools". He dedicated the work to his uncle, Sir Richard Lewkenor, Chief Justice of Chester and presiding judge of the Council in the Marches at Ludlow. It was through this connection that Samuel married Jane Hopton, the widow of Richard Cresset (d.1601) of Upton Cressett, Shropshire. Samuel served as M.P. for Bishop's Castle in 1604 while his brother Lewes sat for Bridgnorth. In June he moved that Eton College and Winchester schools be added to a bill preventing the wives and children of Masters of Colleges from residing at college, his cousin, Edward, voted against the Bill. During the trial of the Gunpowder Plot participants in 1606 Lewkenor complained of jostling on the benches due to the Warden of the Fleet prison selling tickets to the spectacle, leading to overcrowding of the members. Samuel quipped that the warden should be committed to the Tower and placed in the famous cell known as Little Ease because he ‘caused them to stand in little ease’. No more is heard of him after the Parliament of 1610: his wife died in 1611 and he was not mentioned in his uncle Richard's will of 1615, by which time it is presumed he was deceased.
