= Lewes Lewknor =

English courtier, MP, writer, soldier and judge (c.1560–1627)

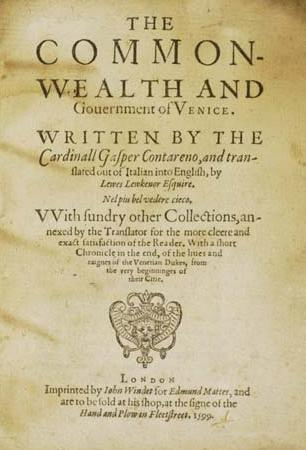
- The Commonwealth and Government of Venice "translated out of Italian into English by Lewes Lewkenor Esquire"
- Born: c.1560 Selsey, Sussex
- Died: 11 March 1627
- Education: Cambridge University; Middle Temple
- Occupations: soldier, lawyer, courtier, Member of Parliament, author, Master of the ceremonies, judge.
- Known for: The Estate of English Fugitives; The Commonwealth and Government of Venice

Sir Lewes Lewknor (c.1560–1627) was an English courtier, M.P., writer, soldier, and Judge who served as Master of the Ceremonies to King James I of England. M.P. for Midhurst in 1597 and for Bridgnorth 1604–10. His career has been described as a "tortuous trajectory rich in false starts, byways and rather nebulous interludes...[with] slippery religious and political allegiances".

He was noted for his translations of courtly European literature. Particularly important was the translation of Gasparo Contarini's account of the Venetian republic, The Commonwealth and Government of Venice, which influenced contemporary writers including Shakespeare.

He was also the author of an original work, The Estate of English Fugitives, a polemic attacking the Spanish and the machinations of Catholic clergy, while also defending the rights of English Catholics.

== Early career ==
He was the son of Thomas Lewknor of Tangmere and Selsey and his wife Bridget Lewes. He studied at Cambridge and the Middle Temple, working for a short time as a lawyer with his uncle, Richard. His brother, Edmund Lewknor, was tutor to the Jesuit priest John Gerard.

In the 1580s he was in the Low Countries, as an exile due to his Catholic sympathies. He attempted a career as a soldier, serving as a captain in the Duke of Parma's army, but suffered a disabling injury to his right arm. Lewknor would later acknowledge the debt he owed to the General under whom he served, Jan Baptista del Monte, and the general's brother, Camillo del Monte.

In 1587, he was living in Antwerp with his wife, but returned to England after experiencing financial problems. He reported to Lord Burghley about the activities of English Catholics working for the Spanish. He became a member of parliament for Midhurst in 1597. Lewknor served as a Gentleman Pensioner in Ordinary from 1599 to 1603. He ostensibly accepted the Church of England after his return from the continent but returned to Catholicism after the death of Queen Elizabeth.

== Master of the Ceremonies ==
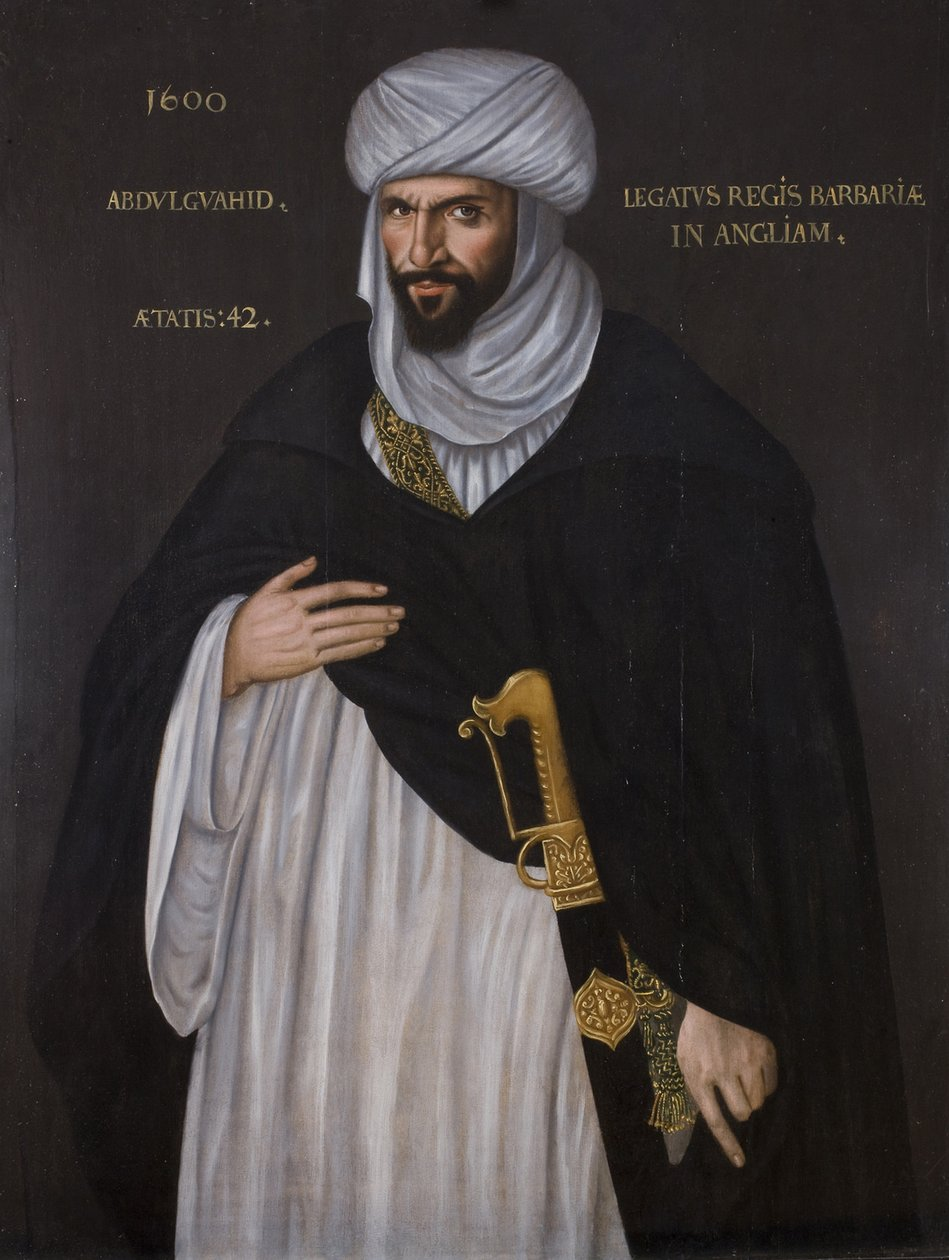
Lewknor escorted Abd el-Ouahed ben Messaoud in 1600.

Lewknor became an expert on ceremonial court protocol and as a Gentleman Pensioner, was required to host foreign ambassadors. In 1600 he looked after the French ambassador, travelling with him from Dover to London. In the same year he escorted the Moroccan ambassador Abd el-Ouahed ben Messaoud, suggested to be the inspiration for Shakespeare's Othello.

After James I came to the throne in 1603, Lewknor's position was regularised. He was knighted in the same year and he was given the newly created post of Master of the Ceremonies, for which he received an annual salary of £200. The post was confirmed for his lifetime in 1605. Lewknor's life was taken up with his duties to attend foreign dignitaries. On 24 September 1603, at Winchester, Lewknor replied for the King in Spanish to the ambassador, Juan de Tassis, 1st Count of Villamediana, and looked after the arrival of Juan Fernández de Velasco y Tovar, 5th Duke of Frías, Constable of Castile at Dover in August 1604. On 16 October 1612 he met Frederick V of the Palatinate at Gravesend.

An account of his expenses in September 1615 records his reception of French, Polish, and Venetian ambassadors who Lewknor brought to James, Anne of Denmark, and Prince Charles, and he took the French and Venetian ambassadors hunting. He was assisted by John Finet, who eventually succeeded him in the post. The Venetian ambassador Zuane Pesaro described the Lord Chamberlain, William Herbert, 3rd Earl of Pembroke as 'a man of good intention,' but one who was 'influenced by being related to the Master of the Ceremonies.'

At the summoning of James I's first Parliament Lewknor's uncle, Richard (chief justice of Chester and a prominent member of the Council in the Marches) secured his return for Bridgnorth. In the first session of the Parliament Lewes made five speeches and Between 1604 and 1610 he sat on 37 committees. The King also selected him to be among those ordered to manage the ‘matter of estate foreign or matter of intercourse’ at the conference with the Lords of 28 April 1604 on the Union with Scotland.

== Writings ==
Lewknor's publications were mostly translations of courtly and political works by continental European writers. He translated from French, Spanish and Italian, and is credited with coining "cashiering" from the Flemish "Kasserren"; "unnobly"; "well-expressed"; "unrefusable" and "Sinonical".

In 1594, Lewknor translated The Resolved Gentleman, Hernando de Acuña's version of Olivier de la Marche's le Chevalier délibéré. Lewknor's version of this chivalric allegory has recently been interpreted as "a subtle, perceptive but scathing criticism of the Elizabethan court in the 1590s". The work was prefaced with dedicatory poems by Maurice Kyffin and Sir John Harington. Lewknor praised his university friend, Edmund Spenser, in his introduction, "the following ages among millions of other noble works penned in her praise, shall as much admire the writer, but far more the subject of The Faerie Queen, as ever former ages did Homer and his Achilles, or Virgil, and his Aeneas".

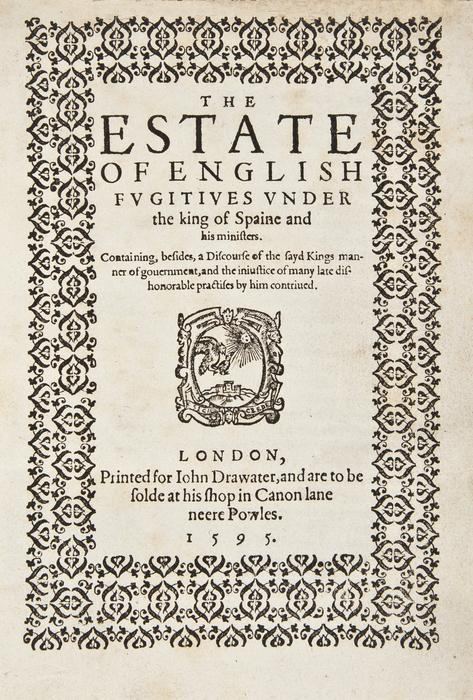
The title page of The Estate of English Fugitives, 1595

In 1595 A Discourse of the Usage of the English Fugitives, by the Spaniard was published, which became very popular having four reprintings in two years, expanded with the title The Estate of English Fugitives under the king of Spaine and his ministers. The book gave a colourful account of the author's adventures as a soldier of fortune in the Netherlands; it attacked the Spanish and the Catholic clergy, addressing English Catholics with the assertion that "They make you and other Catholics believe that what practices and drifts so ever they take in hand, are all for the zeale of religion...and you silly foules think all they saie to bee Gospell, whereas – God Wot – religion is the least matter of a thousand they think upon." Published under the initials "L.L.", the work has been attributed to Lewknor. Despite the initials, it has also been sometimes incorrectly attributed to Lewes' brother Samuel Lewkenor, who had returned from Europe in 1594 and published an account of his travels. (Note: Samuel published his account of the Universities he had encountered on his travels.)

Literary historian Marco Nievergelt, however, says that Lewes is "generally accepted" as its author. In one paragraph Lewknor expresses thanks to the general he served under in the Low Countries, Jan Baptista del Monte and his brother Camillo del Monte, and he repeats his gratitude in a similar paragraph in his next work The Commonwealth and Government of Venice.

His 1599 translation of Gasparo Contarini's De Magistratibus et Republica Venetorum (as The Commonwealth and Government of Venice) demonstrates "the admiration Englishmen could express towards aristocratic republics".

Lewknor described the republic as a combination of genius and divine favour: "as it were entertaining a league of intelligence with heavenly powers". Among the dedications are poems by Edmund Spenser, Maurice Kyffin, Sir John Astley (Master of the Revels) .The book influenced the portrayal of Venice in literature, notably in Shakespeare's plays, Othello especially, and Ben Jonson's Volpone. The book also included material adapted from other sources, including passages from Donato Gianotti's Libro de la Republica di Venetiana, providing additional historical information, and content from books giving details of local geography and customs.

Lewknor was one of Prince Henry's circle and contributed Old Wormy Age, a humorous panegyric verse, to the preface of Thomas Coryat's Coryat's Crudities: Hastily gobled up in Five Moneth’s Travels published in 1611.

== Family ==
Sometime before 1588, while in the Spanish Netherlands, Lewknor married Beatrice de Rota. The couple had two sons, William, and Thomas (1587–1645) as well as a daughter, Beatrice. William was named in the Selsey lease of 1597 and in 1606 he was in Angers consorting with the Jesuits. His wife, Beatrice de Rota, died from smallpox in March 1605 and Lewes quickly married Katherine Argall (née Bocking), the widow of his cousin Sir Thomas Argall, but Katherine also died from the smallpox within six months of the marriage. He finally married Mary Blount, daughter of Sir Richard Blount of Dedisham and in 1624 the couple were 'justly suspected to be popish recusants'.

In May 1624 Lewknor spent sometime incarcerated in the Tower of London for ordering a ship for the Spanish ambassador without authorisation.

Following the funeral of James I, Lewknor was accused by the Venetian ambassador, Zuane Pesaro, of deliberately excluding him from the funeral. Lewknor pleaded ill health but he still spent some time in the Marshalsea and was suspended from his office. He suffered seven months of house arrest until the Venetian relented and he was restored to his post. Lewknor and his wife were twice more accused of being recusants at the Middlesex sessions.

Lewknor's last official engagement was on Sunday 29 November 1626, when Charles I dispatched him to attend François de Bassompierre: "Lucnar came to bring me a very rich present from the king, of four diamonds set in a lozenge, and a great stone at the end; and the same evening sent again to fetch me to hear an excellent English play".

Lewes Lewknor died on 11 March 1627 and his post of Master of the Ceremonies reverted to his assistant John Finet. Lewknor's son Thomas survived him, but having become a Jesuit priest he died childless in 1645.
