= Géza Vermes =

British biblical scholar, orientalist, and historian of religion

Géza Vermes FBA
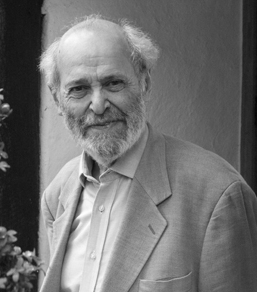
- Vermes in 2007
- Born: 22 June 1924; Makó, Kingdom of Hungary
- Died: 8 May 2013 (aged 88); London, United Kingdom

Academic background
- Education: University of Budapest; Catholic University of Leuven

Academic work
- Discipline: Biblical criticism; History of religion; Oriental studies
- Sub-discipline: Dead Sea Scrolls; Historical Jesus; Jewish studies
- Institutions: Durham University; University of Newcastle upon Tyne; University of Edinburgh; University of Oxford; Wolfson College, Oxford; Oriental Institute, Oxford; Oxford Centre for Hebrew and Jewish Studies
- Notable works: The Complete Dead Sea Scrolls in English (1962); Jesus the Jew (1973); Jesus and the World of Judaism (1983); The Religion of Jesus the Jew (1993)

Géza Vermes, FBA (Hungarian: [ˈvɛrmɛʃ ˈɡeːzɒ]; 22 June 1924 – 8 May 2013) was a British academic, Biblical scholar, and Judaist of Jewish–Hungarian descent—one who also served as a Roman Catholic priest in his youth—and scholar specialized in the field of the history of religion, particularly ancient Judaism and early Christianity. He is best known for his complete translation of the Dead Sea Scrolls into English; his research focused on the Dead Sea Scrolls and other Ancient Hebrew writings in Aramaic such as the Targumim, and on the life and religion of Jesus. Vermes was one of the most important voices in contemporary Jesus research, and he has been described as the greatest Jesus scholar of his time. Vermes' written work on Jesus focuses principally on the Jewishness of the historical Jesus, as seen in the broader context of the narrative scope of Jewish history and theology, while questioning and challenging the basis of the Christian doctrine on Jesus.

== Biography ==
Vermes was born in Makó, Kingdom of Hungary, in 1924 to a family of Hungarian Jewish descent: Terézia Riesz, a schoolteacher, and Ernő Vermes, a liberal journalist. The Vermes family was of Jewish background but had given up religious practice by the mid-19th century. All three were baptised as Roman Catholics when he was six; referring to his parents' conversion, he defined it as a way to escape from the rising tide of antisemitism in Europe (see also Interwar period). In an interview with Rachel Kohn of the Australian Broadcasting Corporation in 1999 he stated: "In fact, I never was anything but a Jew with a temporary sort of outer vestment. I realised I ought to recognise my genuine identity." Nonetheless, his mother and father were murdered in the Holocaust in 1944.

Vermes attended a Catholic seminary. When he was eligible for college, in 1942, Jews were not accepted into Hungarian universities. After the Second World War he became a Catholic priest, but was not admitted into the Jesuit or Dominican orders because of his Jewish ancestry. Vermes was accepted into the Order of the Fathers of Notre-Dame de Sion, a French-Belgian order which prayed for the Jews. Later he moved to Paris, where he studied under the Hungarian born French Jewish scholar Georges Vajda, a graduate of the Rabbinical Seminary of Budapest.

He studied then at the College St Albert and the Catholic University of Leuven in Belgium, where he specialised in Oriental history, civilisations and languages. In 1953, Vermes obtained a Doctorate of Theology with the first dissertation written on the Dead Sea Scrolls and its historical framework. In 1962 he completed a first translation of the Dead Sea Scrolls, later revised and much augmented. Also in Paris, Vermes befriended and worked with Paul Demann, a scholar, like him, of Hungarian Jewish origins. Together with a third collaborator, Renee Bloch, they battled doggedly against the anti-Semitic content in Catholic education and ritual of the time. The Second Vatican Council would later accept many of the trio's theological arguments.

After researching the Dead Sea Scrolls in Paris for several years, Vermes had met Pamela Hobson Curle, a poet and scholar, disciple of the Neo-Hasidic Jewish philosopher Martin Buber, and the two fell in love. She was married and the mother of two children, but her marriage was in the process of ending. In 1958, after her divorce, and after Vermes left the priesthood, they married, remaining together and often collaborating on work, until her death in 1993. He also renounced Christianity and embraced his Jewish identity, although not religious observance. He took up a teaching post at the University of Newcastle upon Tyne.

In 1965, after teaching Biblical Hebrew for several years at University of Newcastle upon Tyne in the north of England, he joined the Faculty of Oriental Studies at the University of Oxford, rising to become the first Oxford Professor of Jewish Studies before his retirement in 1991; he subsequently directed the Oxford Forum for Qumran Research at the Oxford Centre for Hebrew and Jewish Studies. In 1970 he reconverted to Judaism as a liberal Jew, and became a member of the Liberal Jewish Synagogue of London. After the death of his first wife in 1993, he married Margaret Unarska in 1996 and adopted her son, Ian. Vermes died on 8 May 2013 at the age of 88.

== Academic career ==
Vermes was one of the first scholars to examine the Dead Sea Scrolls after their discovery in 1947, and is the author of the standard translation into English of the Dead Sea Scrolls: The Dead Sea Scrolls in English (1962). He is one of the leading scholars in the field of the study of the historical Jesus (see Selected Publications, below) and together with Fergus Millar and Martin Goodman, Vermes was responsible for substantially revising Emil Schurer's three-volume work, The History of the Jewish People in the Age of Jesus Christ, His An Introduction to the Complete Dead Sea Scrolls, revised edition (2000), is a study of the collection at Qumran.

Until his death, he was a Professor Emeritus of Jewish Studies and Emeritus Fellow of Wolfson College, Oxford, but continued to teach at the Oriental Institute in Oxford. He had edited the Journal of Jewish Studies from 1971 to his death, and from 1991 he had been director of the Oxford Forum for Qumran Research at the Oxford Centre for Hebrew and Jewish Studies. He inspired the creation of the British Association for Jewish Studies (BAJS) in 1975 and of the European Association for Jewish Studies (EAJS) in 1981 and acted as founding president for both.

Vermes was a Fellow of the British Academy; a Fellow of the European Academy of Arts, Sciences and Humanities; holder of an Oxford D. Litt. (1988) and of honorary doctorates from the University of Edinburgh (1989), University of Durham (1990), University of Sheffield (1994) and the Central European University of Budapest (2008). He was awarded the Wilhelm Bacher Memorial Medal by the Hungarian Academy of Sciences (1996), the Memorial Medal of the city of Makó, his place of birth (2008) and the keys of the cities of Monroe LA and Natchez MS (2009). He received a vote of congratulation from the US House of Representatives, proposed by the Representative of Louisiana on 17 September 2009.

In the course of a lecture tour in the United States in September 2009, Vermes spoke at the University of North Carolina in Chapel Hill, at Duke University in Durham NC, at Johns Hopkins University in Baltimore MD, and at the University of Louisiana at Monroe and at Baton Rouge.

On 23 January 2012 Penguin Books celebrated at Wolfson College, Oxford, the golden jubilee of Vermes's The Dead Sea Scrolls in English, which has sold an estimated half-a-million copies worldwide. A "Fiftieth anniversary" edition has been issued in the Penguin Classics series.

== Historical Jesus ==
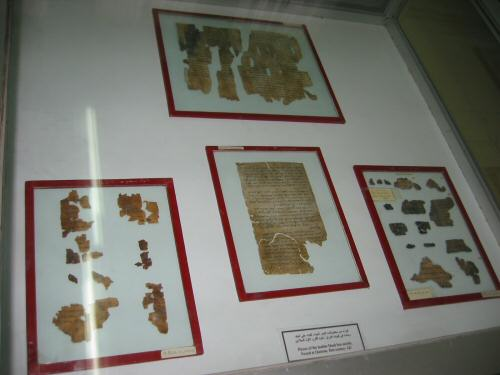
Fragments of the Dead Sea Scrolls previously on display at the Jordan Archaeological Museum, now in The Jordan Museum, Amman.

Vermes was a prominent scholar in the contemporary field of historical Jesus research. The contemporary approach, known as the "third quest", emphasises Jesus's Jewish identity and context. It portrays Jesus as founding a renewal movement within Judaism.

Vermes described Jesus as a 1st-century Jewish holy man, a commonplace view in academia but novel to the public when Vermes began publishing. Contrary to certain other scholars (such as E. P. Sanders), Vermes concludes that Jesus did not reach out to non-Jews. For example, he attributes positive references to Samaritans in the gospels not to Jesus himself but to early Christian editing. He suggests that, properly understood, the historical Jesus is a figure that Jews should find familiar and attractive. This historical Jesus, however, is so different from the Christ of faith that Christians, says Vermes, may well want to rethink the fundamentals of their faith.

Important works on this topic include Jesus the Jew (1973), which describes Jesus as a thoroughly Jewish Galilean charismatic, The Gospel of Jesus the Jew (1981), which examines Jewish parallels to Jesus's teaching and Christian Beginnings (2012), which traces the evolution of the figure of Jesus from Jewish charismatic in the synoptic Gospels to equality with God in the Council of Nicea (325 CE). He also expounded this theme in the controversial television miniseries, Jesus: The Evidence (Channel 4, 1984).

Vermes believed it is possible "to retrieve the authentic Gospel of Jesus, his first-hand message to his original followers."

The historical Jesus can be retrieved only within the context of first-century Galilean Judaism. The Gospel image must therefore be inserted into the historical canvas of Palestine in the first century CE, with the help of the works of Flavius Josephus, the Dead Sea Scrolls and early rabbinic literature. Against this background, what kind of picture of Jesus emerges from the Gospels? That of a rural holy man, initially a follower of the movement of repentance launched by another holy man, John the Baptist. In the hamlets and villages of Lower Galilee and the lakeside, Jesus set out to preach the coming of the Kingdom of God within the lifetime of his generation and outlined the religious duties his simple listeners were to perform to prepare themselves for the great event.

== Selected publications ==
- Scripture and Tradition in Judaism: Haggadic studies (Studia post-biblica), Brill, Leiden 1961 ISBN 90-04-03626-1
- Jesus the Jew: A Historian's Reading of the Gospels, Minneapolis, Fortress Press 1973 ISBN 0-8006-1443-7
- Post-Biblical Jewish Studies, Brill, Leiden, 1975 ISBN 90-04-04160-5
- The Dead Sea Scrolls: Qumran in Perspective, Minneapolis, Fortress Press 1977 ISBN 0-8006-1435-6
- Jesus and the World of Judaism, Minneapolis, Fortress Press 1983 ISBN 0-8006-1784-3
- The Essenes According to the Classical Sources (with Martin Goodman), Sheffield Academic Press 1989 ISBN 1-85075-139-0
- The Religion of Jesus the Jew, Minneapolis, Fortress Press 1993 ISBN 0-8006-2797-0
- The Complete Dead Sea Scrolls in English, Penguin 1997 ISBN 978-0-14-044952-5 (2004 ed.) (Fiftieth anniversary ed. 2011 ISBN 978-0-141-19731-9)
- The Changing Faces of Jesus, London, Penguin 2001 ISBN 0-14-026524-4
- Jesus in his Jewish Context, Minneapolis, Fortress Press 2003 ISBN 0-8006-3623-6
- The Authentic Gospel of Jesus, London, Penguin 2004 ISBN 0-14-100360-X
- The Passion, London, Penguin 2005 ISBN 0-14-102132-2.
- Who's Who in the Age of Jesus, London, Penguin 2005 ISBN 0-14-051565-8
- The Nativity: History and Legend, London, Penguin 2006 ISBN 0-14-102446-1
- The Resurrection: History and Myth, Doubleday Books 2008 ISBN 0-385-52242-8.
- Searching for the Real Jesus, London, SCM Press 2010 ISBN 978-0-334-04358-4
- The Story of the Scrolls: The Miraculous Discovery and True Significance of the Dead Sea Scrolls, London, Penguin 2010 ISBN 978-0-14-104615-0
- Jesus: Nativity – Passion – Resurrection, London, Penguin 2010 ISBN 978-0-14-104622-8
- Jesus in the Jewish World, London, SCM Press 2010 ISBN 978-0-334-04379-9
- Christian Beginnings. From Nazareth to Nicaea, AD 30–325, London, Allen Lane 2012 ISBN 978-1-846-14150-8
- The True Herod, London, Bloomsbury, 2014 ISBN 978-0-567-57544-9

For more details see his autobiography, Providential Accidents, London, SCM Press, 1998 ISBN 0-334-02722-5; Rowman & Littlefield, Lanham MD, 1998 ISBN 0-8476-9340-6.

== See also ==
- Paul Winter
- Paula Fredriksen
- Daniel Boyarin
