= Paul Winter (disambiguation) =

Paul Winter (born 1939) is an American jazz saxophonist.

Paul Winter may also refer to:

- Paul Winter (writer) (1904–1969), Czech barrister and writer
- Paul Winter (athlete) (1906–1992), French athlete, primarily in the discus throw
- Paul Winter (violinist) (1914–1992), American virtuoso violinist

== See also ==
- Paul Wynter (1935–2019), Antiguan and Barbudan bodybuilder
- Paul Winters (disambiguation)
