= Christian Beginnings =

2012 book by Geza Vermes

First edition (publ. Allen Lane)

Christian Beginnings from Nazareth to Nicea, AD 30-325 is a 2012 book by the historian Geza Vermes, Professor of Jewish Studies at the University of Oxford, which traces the development of the figure of Jesus from charismatic Jewish prophet to being considered equal with God by the fourth century Council of Nicea. It follows his earlier works on Jesus the Jew.

== Synopsis ==
=== 1. Charismatic Judaism from Moses to Jesus ===
Vermes surveys the notion of Charismatic Judaism which he introduced in his 1973 book Jesus the Jew. Although Judaism was centred on adherence to the Torah, charismatic prophets such as Elijah, Elisha and Isaiah were also an important part of Jewish life and this continued with the Essene Teacher of Righteousness, Jesus ben Sira and Hanina ben Dosa, many of whom were miracle workers.

=== 2. The Charismatic Religion of Jesus ===
Jesus entered the public domain as a follower and disciple of John the Baptist who he compared with Elijah. From the accounts in the synoptic gospels, Jesus emerges as a highly popular itinerant spiritual healer, exorcist and preacher. The most important part of his message was the imminent onset of the Kingdom of God which occurs about one hundred times in the synoptic gospels and remains important in the letters of Paul but almost entirely disappears from the Gospel of John, which was written later. His emphasis was situated between the apocalyptic imagery of a final cosmic battle and the rabbinic hope for a restored earthly kingdom of Israel. Though he calls God his Father, this was common in Judaism and his teaching stays within the scope of the Torah, though his stress on a childlike trust in God is unique.

=== 3. Nascent Charismatic Christianity ===
The picture supplied in some of the letters of Paul, together with those of James and John and the Didache provide an earlier picture than the Acts of the Apostles. The early church was characterised by faith healing, manifestations of the Spirit and the breaking of bread, also known as the love feast and taught the Kingdom of God, the crucified risen and glorified Messiah and the imminence of his Second Coming, though the urgency of the Parousia declined as the century progressed. It reflects traditional Judaism in the light of Messianic faith.

=== 4. The Christianity of Paul ===
The synoptic gospels show Jesus as a teacher divinely appointed to deliver a message, but Paul's Christ is the very object of the message. Paul's view of Christ's death as a redemptive act which saved the world from sin brings the idea of the Adam's primeval sin affecting everyone into the Jewish tradition for the first time. Baptism isn't simply a sign of repentance and cleansing but an identification with the death and resurrection of Jesus. He still held to the idea that Jesus would return to establish the Kingdom within the lifetime of people then living. However the status of Christ was not firmly established. Although he referred to the Son of God and Son of the Father, Jesus is seen as subordinate to God and isolated texts (e.g. Phil 2:6-11) are not representative and may not be original.

=== 5. Johannine Christianity ===
The Jesus of the Fourth Gospel has little in common with the popular preacher familiar from the Synoptic Gospel tradition. There is little emphasis on the Kingdom of Heaven, few if any parables and Jesus is lordly, transcendent and authoritarian. He is not an ordinary human being but a mysterious otherworldly personality.

Though traditionally associated with the Apostle John, the unknown author of the fourth gospel, probably writing in the first decade of the second century, had a strong Hellenistic background with knowledge of Philo of Alexandria and Hermeticism. This is shown most clearly in the first chapter which was probably composed after the rest of the gospel since its ideas are not referred to elsewhere. Jesus is portrayed as the Logos which emanates from God, the Son of God and the sacrificial Lamb of God, but he still claims "The Father is greater than I" (John 14:28). The Holy Spirit is personified in a new way, not seen in the other gospels, as the "other Counsellor" or "Advocate".

=== 6. The Didache and Barnabas ===
A fuller introduction is given to the non-New Testament works which represent the doctrinal legacy of Christianity from about AD 100 to 325 as these are less well known. The Didache, or Teaching of the Twelve Apostles, is the earliest text which portrays the common rules of the early church. It influenced later Church Orders though it was rejected for the New Testament. The emphasis is on rules for living rather than doctrine and Jesus is never identified as God, but rather the Servant of God. The anti-Jewish Epistle of Barnabas by contrast promotes a Johannine Logos-like Son who reveals God.

=== 7. The Apostolic Fathers ===
The letters of Ignatius of Antioch (110 AD) were the first to declare the divinity of Jesus repeatedly and they criticize the Judaizers who still insisted that Christians should follow Jewish practices and the Docetists, who didn't believe Jesus was really human and opposed the idea of his suffering and death. The anonymous Letter to Diognetus uses the image of the Craftsman or Demiurge who God sent as the Servant.

=== 8. Apologists and Theologians of the Second Century ===
Justin Martyr had been a sophist and thought Plato, not understanding the Jewish scripture, had talked of three gods. He offered various proofs that Jesus was the eternal logos. He accuses the Jews of murdering Christ in his Dialogue with Trypho, as did Melito of Sardis. Irenaeus of Lyons was the leading opponent of Gnosticism, challenging the dualistic Valentinus and Marcion in Against Heresies. He stressed the importance of the succession of bishops and the Eucharist.

=== 9. Three Pillars of Wisdom ===
The greatest standard bearers of the third century were not bishops, all came from North Africa, lived under Roman persecution and are not proclaimed saints by the church. Tertullian was a lawyer who in opposing the Gnostics produced the first clear statement of Christ as both man and God, though he denied the perpetual virginity of Mary as favouring the Gnostics, and the co-eternity of the Son. But he joined a charismatic group, the Montanists, which was condemned by the Bishop of Rome. Clement of Alexandria stressed the need for real knowledge rather than the false knowledge of the Gnostics. Origen allegedly castrated himself in his teens to maintain his purity and went everywhere barefoot. Since the beginning of the twentieth century, some scholars have questioned the historicity of Origen's self-castration, with many seeing it as a wholesale fabrication. His examination of the Old Testament produced the Hexapla comparing the original Hebrew and different Greek translations. He rebutted the Talmudic account of Jesus in Against Celsus but floundered in his support of the virgin birth.

=== 10. Nicea: Eusebius of Caesarea, Arius and Constantine ===
The Council of Nicea happened soon after the Roman emperor Constantine had become the patron of Christianity in 312. It was triggered by a public disagreement between Alexander bishop of Alexandria and his presbyter Arius whose clear formulation of the relationship between Jesus and God, following the pattern of Origen and Eusebius of Caesarea, placed Jesus in an inferior position, seeing this as the only way to avoid formal polytheism. When Alexander excommunicated him, he sought the protection of Eusebius and Eusebius of Nicomedia who both had the ear of the emperor. Eventually Constantine invoked a council to settle what he considered "these small and very insignificant questions". Only some 200-300 bishops out of 1,800 invited came, almost exclusively from the Greek east. After an inconclusive debate, Alexander and his secretary Athanasius asserted that the son was of the same essence as the Father, that he was homoousios or consubstantial with God. This carried the council but the issue continued to be debated until Theodosius I made the profession of Arianism illegal in 381.

=== 11. From Charisma to Dogma -- A Bird's Eye View ===
The last chapter reviews the argument and concludes that the Council of Nicea could have ended very differently and that the ideas of consubstantiality and the equality of Jesus with God did not occur before then. It hopes that a new reformation will re-establish the charismatic message of Jesus.

== Reviews ==
Rowan Williams, the ex-Archbishop of Canterbury:

Geza Vermes is the unchallenged doyen of scholarship in the English-speaking world on the Jewish literature of the age of Jesus, especially the Dead Sea Scrolls. In a series of deeply learned and lucid books, he has opened up the subject to non-specialist readers, offering some provocative and searching questions for Christian readers of their scriptures. In this book, he takes the story a little further forward, to trace the evolution of a distinctively Christian vocabulary up to and including the era when the first Christian creeds were being formulated. His subtitle flags up the climax of the story, at the Council of Nicaea in 325, when what he describes as a "revolutionary new formula" was agreed – thanks largely to pressure from a Roman emperor newly sympathetic to the Christian faith, and as eager as any contemporary politician to make it serve the cause of social cohesion... There is an assumption that the basic alteration is a matter of turning the faith that Jesus himself held into a faith about him... This is a beautiful and magisterial book; but it leaves unsolved some of the puzzles that still make readers of the New Testament pause to ask what really is the right, the truthful, way to talk about a figure like the Jesus we meet in these texts.

Stuart Kelly:

The career of Geza Vermes...is best known for his ground-breaking work on the texts found at Qumran, better known as the Dead Sea Scrolls. This book represents the summation of his thinking about the early history of Christianity. It is a challenging and engaging book that sets out to retrace the route by which a Jewish preacher in 1st-century Israel came to be declared as consubstantial and co-equal with the omnipotent, omniscient only God. Vermes’s argument is summed up in the title he takes for the conclusion: “from charisma to dogma”. How did the flesh and blood Jesus become the metaphysical Christ Pantocrator?

Karen Armstrong:

Over the course of his long, distinguished career, Geza Vermes, the first professor of Jewish Studies at Oxford university, has made a major contribution to our understanding of the historical Jesus. In Christian Beginnings, as in his groundbreaking work Jesus the Jew (1973), he shows that Jesus would have been a recognisable and familiar figure to his contemporaries. A healer, exorcist and compelling preacher, he was the latest in a line of charismatic prophets who existed for centuries alongside the established priestly tradition and offered an alternative form of Judaism, based on vision, ecstasy and miraculous healing, and frequently in conflict with the Israelite ruling class.
In this book, however, Vermes takes the story further, showing how the human figure of Jesus became increasingly other-worldly until, at the Council of Nicaea in 325, he was declared fully divine.
