= Oxford Centre for Hebrew and Jewish Studies =

UK charitable organization

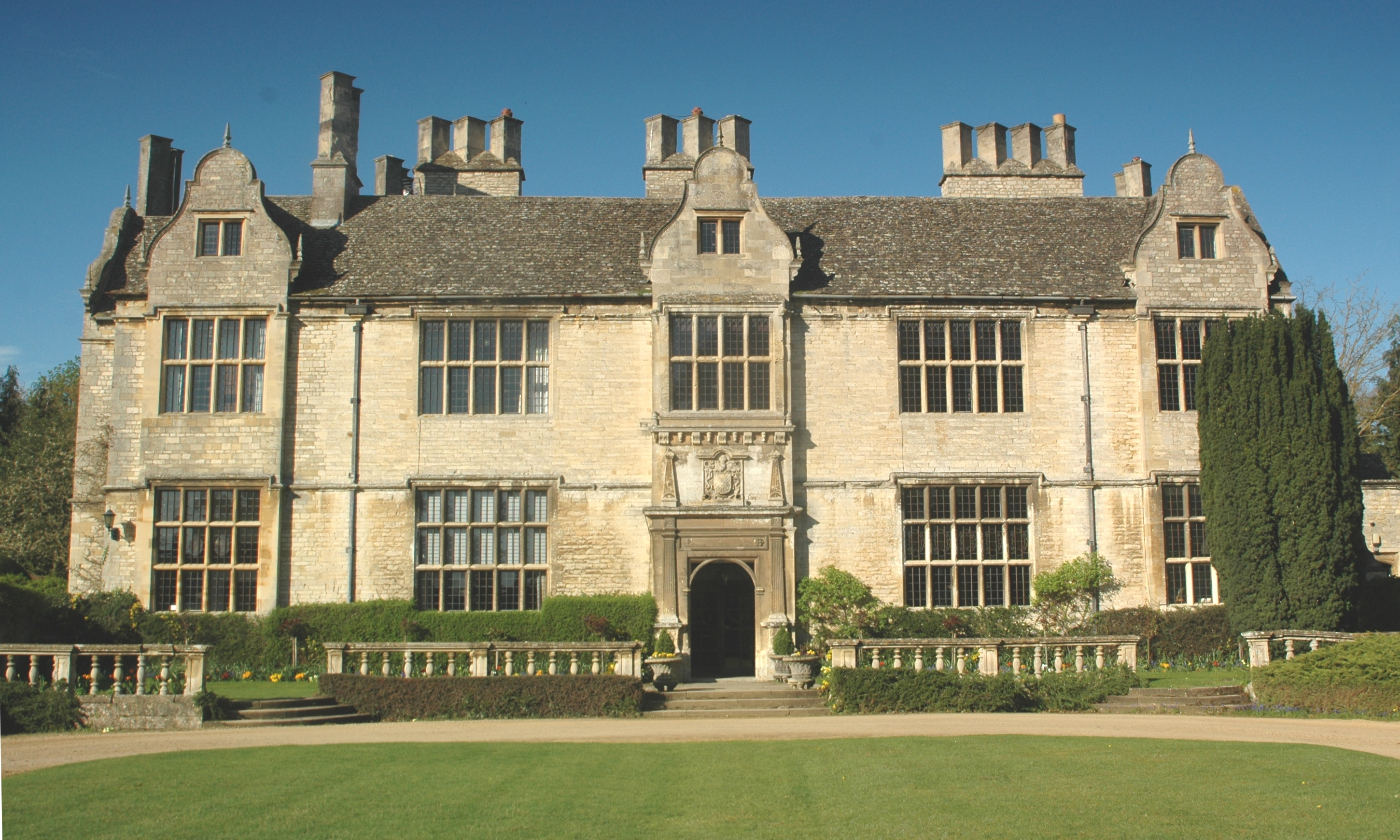
- Yarnton Manor, the former location of the Oxford Centre for Hebrew and Jewish Studies

Location
- Walton Street, Oxford, England

Information
- Founded: 1972
- Founder: David Patterson
- President: Judith Olszowy-Schlanger
- Website: http://www.ochjs.ac.uk/

The Oxford Centre for Hebrew and Jewish Studies (OCHJS) is a recognised independent centre of the University of Oxford, England. Its research fellows teach on a variety of undergraduate and master's degrees in Oriental studies, and it publishes the Journal of Jewish Studies.

== History and case statement ==
The centre was founded in 1972 by Dr David Patterson to help restore Jewish Studies in Europe in the aftermath of the Holocaust. Currently it is based in the Clarendon Institute, Walton Street, Oxford, OX1 2HG, having relocated from Yarnton Manor in 2014. It is a registered charity and a company limited by guarantee incorporated in England, under English law. Today, it is the leading academic Jewish studies centre in Europe. Its Fellows and Lecturers provide courses in Hebrew and Jewish studies for undergraduates and postgraduates up to doctoral level in many faculties within the University of Oxford. The centre also promotes Jewish studies based on the Bodleian Library's Hebrew and Jewish collections by supporting research, by development projects, and by shared staffing with the centre's Leopold Muller Memorial Library.

== Leopold Muller Memorial Library ==
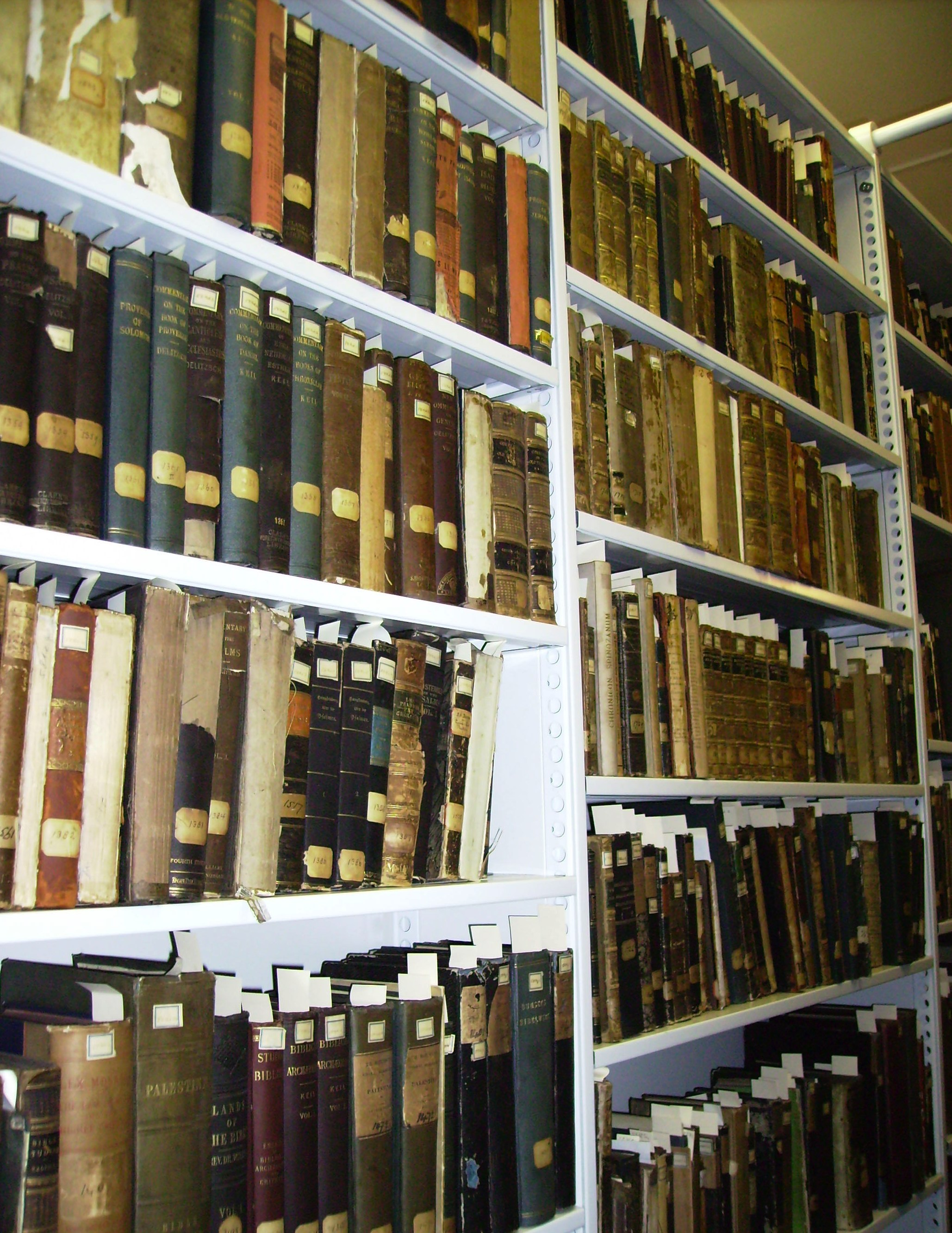
Muller Library collections

The centre's library is named the Leopold Muller Memorial Library. It is housed in the basement of the Clarendon Institute. It comprises one of the best collections of books and periodicals in Jewish Studies in Europe and serves as a resource for scholars, students and visiting fellows of the centre. The core of the Library consists of several rare collections and archives; among those one finds a large collection of materials donated by Rabbi Louis Jacobs, Loewe Pamphlets Collection from Herbert Loewe and his elder son, the library of Jacob H. Coppenhagen (1913–1997), Kressel Archive, Foyle-Montefiore Collection (which incorporates the library of Leopold Zunz), Lipson-Shandel and Moses Montefiore Archives of rare documentation regarding life and activities of Sir Moses Montefiore, one of the largest collections of Yizkor Books in Europe – it counts over 800 memorial volumes for communities destroyed in the Holocaust, and the Archive of Rabbi Hugo Gryn. Among the Library's most recent enterprises are the Digital Haskalah Library project and the Raphael Loewe Archives Digital Exhibition.

== Notable academics ==
- Norman Solomon
- Géza Vermes

=== List of presidents ===
- David Patterson (1972–1992)
- Philip Alexander (1992–1995)
- Bernard Wasserstein (1996–2000
- Peter Oppenheimer (2000–2008)
- David Ariel (2008–2014)
- Martin Goodman (2014–2018)
- Judith Olszowy-Schlanger (2018–)

== Emeritus governors ==
- Martin Blackman
- Elizabeth Corob
- Michael Garston OBE
- Sir Richard Greenbury
- Professor Alan Jones
- The Lord Marks of Broughton
- Peter Oppenheimer
- Felix Posen
- Sir Maurice Shock
- Dennis Trevelyan, CB
- The Rt Hon The Lord Woolf
- The Rt Hon The Lord Young CH DL
