= Sir Thomas Spencer, 1st Baronet =

Sir Thomas Spencer, 1st Baronet (c. 1586 - 7 August 1622) was an English landowner and politician who sat in the House of Commons from 1604 to 1611.

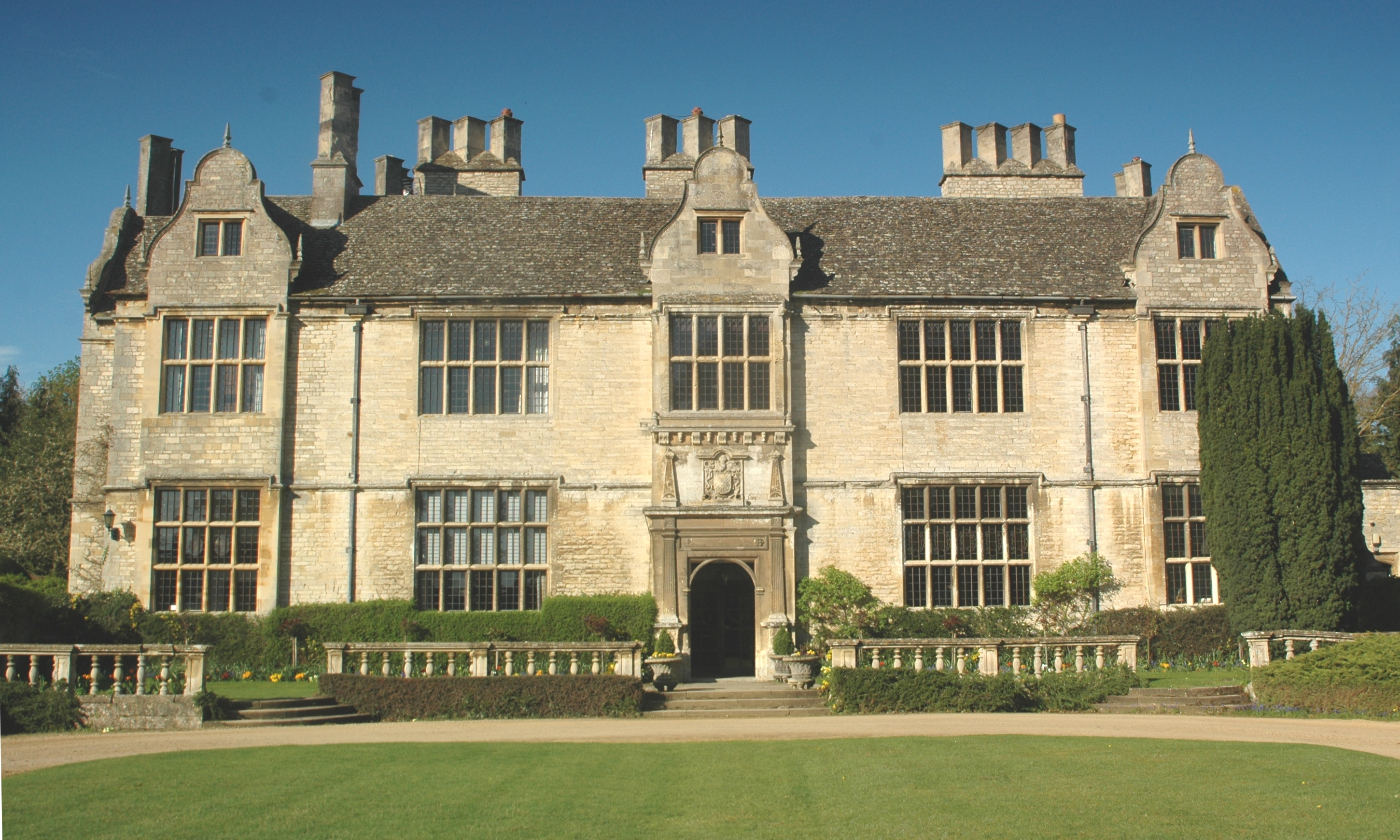
Yarnton Manor, built in 1611 for Sir Thomas Spencer

Spencer was the son of Sir William Spencer, of Yarnton, Oxfordshire, and his wife Margaret Bowyer, daughter of Francis Bowyer, Alderman of London. He matriculated at Brasenose College, Oxford on 8 June 1599, aged 13 and was awarded BA on 18 June 1602. In 1604 he was elected Member of Parliament for Woodstock. He was also a student of Lincoln's Inn in 1604 and in December was one of the keepers of writs and rolls in the court of common pleas. He succeeded to Yarnton on the death of his father in 1608 or 1609 and had Yarnton manor house, a large Jacobean country mansion, built in 1611. He was created baronet of Yardington on 29 June 1611 and was knighted on 4 May 1612, at Whitehall. From 1616 to 1617 he was Sheriff of Oxfordshire. He was famous for his hospitality and rebuilt the tower at the west end of Yarnton Church.

Spencer died at the age of about 36 and was buried at Yarnton on 18 August 1622.

Spencer married Margaret Brainthwait, daughter of Richard Brainthwait, Serjeant at Law in about 1605. After her husband's death, she married as his third wife Richard Butler, 3rd Viscount Mountgarret after 1625. She died at St. Giles' in the Fields on 16 December 1655 and was buried at Yarnton on 21 December.

Parliament of England
Preceded by Lawrence Tanfield; William Scott	Member of Parliament for Woodstock; 1604; With: Sir Richard Lee	Succeeded by Sir James Whitelocke; Sir Philip Cary
Baronetage of England
New creation	Baronet (of Yarnton); 1611–1622	Succeeded by William Spencer
