= Judith Olszowy-Schlanger =

French academic paleographer

- Born: Judith Olszowy; 1967 (age 58–59)
- Occupation: Academic

Judith Olszowy-Schlanger FBA (née Olszowy; born 1967) is a French academic palaeographer who specialises in medieval Jewish manuscripts. Since September 2018, she has been President of the Oxford Centre for Hebrew and Jewish Studies at the University of Oxford.

== Early life and education ==
Olszowy-Schlanger was born in 1967. She studied modern Hebrew at the Institut National des Langues et Civilisations Orientales from 1987 to 1991, and Semitic and Ancient Near Eastern languages at the École des Langues Orientales Anciennes of the Institut Catholique de Paris from 1987 to 1990. She undertook doctoral studies at the University of Cambridge, where she was a member of St John's College, Cambridge and supervised by Geoffrey Khan. She completed her Doctor of Philosophy (PhD) in 1995 with a thesis titled "Karaite marriage contracts in the Middle Ages: a Cairo Geniza study".

== Career ==
Since 2002 Olszowy-Schlanger has been Professor of Hebrew and Judaeo-Arabic Manuscript Studies at the École Pratique des Hautes Études (EPHE) in Paris, France, a position she continues to hold in conjunction with her appointment at Oxford. From 2010 to 2014, she was also President of the European Association for Jewish Studies. In March 2018, she was announced as the next President of the Oxford Centre for Hebrew and Jewish Studies, University of Oxford. She took up the appointment on 1 September 2018, and was additionally elected a Fellow of Corpus Christi College, Oxford.

== Honours ==
In July 2015, Olszowy-Schlanger was elected a Corresponding Fellow of the British Academy (FBA), the United Kingdom's national academy for the humanities and social sciences.
