= Sir Thomas Spencer, 3rd Baronet =

English politician

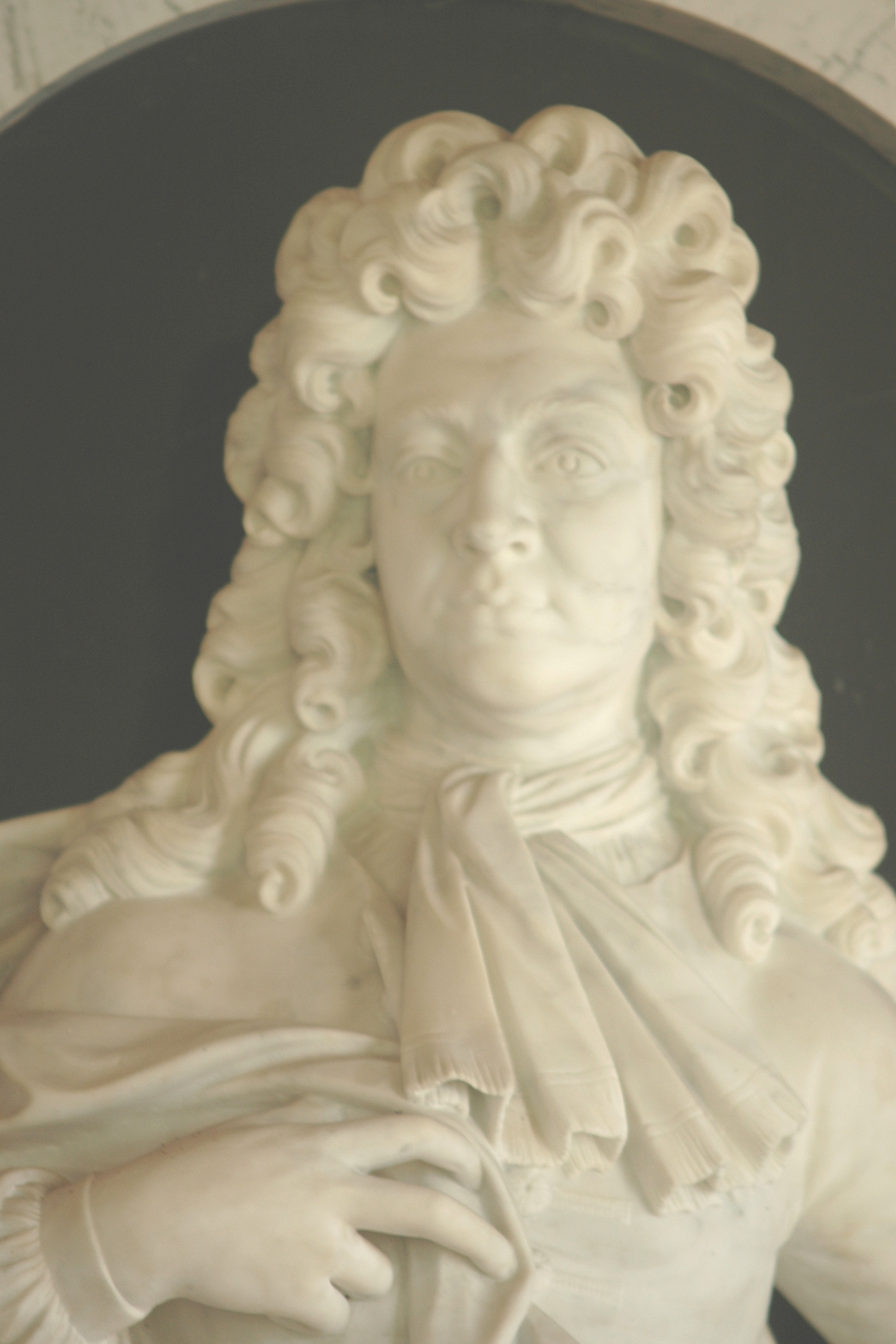
Sir Thomas Spencer, as depicted in his memorial in the Spencer Chapel of Yarnton parish church, Oxfordshire

Sir Thomas Spencer, 3rd Baronet (1 January 1639 – 6 March 1685) was an English politician who sat in the House of Commons from 1660 to 1679.

Spencer was the son of Sir William Spencer, 2nd Baronet and his wife Constance Lucy, daughter of Sir Thomas Lucy of Charlecote Park and Alice Spencer. He inherited the baronetcy of Yarnton on the death of his father in 1647. His mother remarried Sir Edward Smith, Chief Justice of the Irish Common Pleas, by whom she had two further sons.

In 1660, Spencer was elected Member of Parliament for Woodstock in the Convention Parliament. He was re-elected MP for Woodstock in 1661 for the Cavalier Parliament and sat until 1679. He was not an active member either in debates in the House or on committees. During the Exclusion Crisis he was a firm supporter of Charles II, and welcomed him to Oxford at the opening of the Parliament of 1681. He sat on the jury which found Stephen College "the Protestant joiner" guilty of treason.

Spencer died of apoplexy at the age of 46 and is buried in the Spencer Chapel at Yarnton parish church under a "noble and curious monument of white marble".

Spencer married Jane Garrard, daughter of Sir John Garrard, 2nd Baronet of Lamer, Hertfordshire at St Paul's, Covent Garden on 24 January 1655. They had four daughters but no surviving son, and the baronetcy passed to a cousin. His private life, debauched even by Restoration standards (he was quite open about living with his mistress, a young lady of good family, with whom he had a daughter), was a subject of much amusement to his neighbours.

Baronetage of England
Preceded by William Spencer	Baronet (of Yarnton); 1647–1685	Succeeded by Thomas Spencer
