= Spencer baronets =

Extinct baronetcy in the Baronetage of England

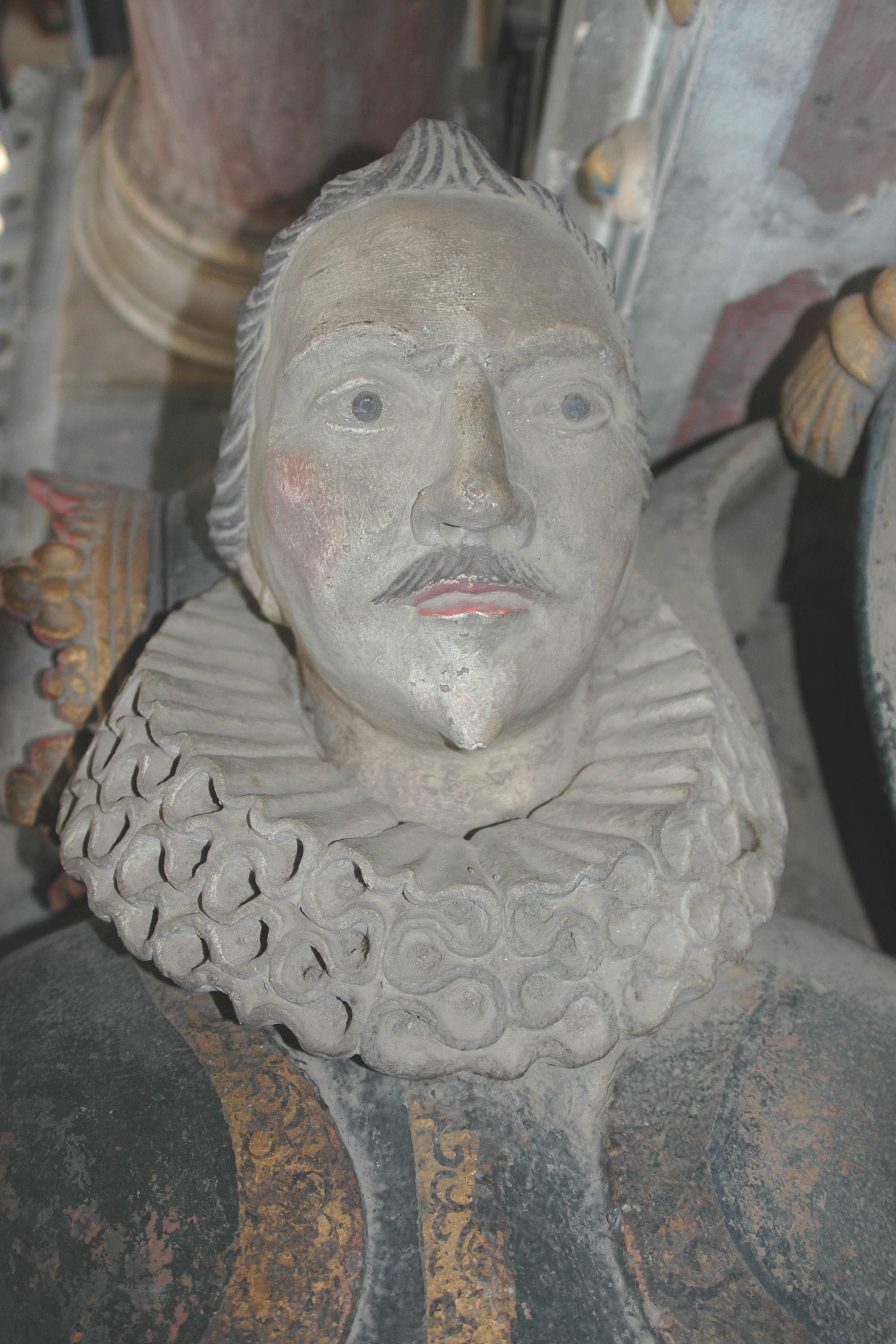
Sir William Spencer (died 1609), father of the first baronet, as depicted in his memorial in the Spencer Chapel of Yarnton parish church, Oxfordshire

There have been three baronetcies, all in the Baronetage of England, created for members of the Spencer family, both for descendants of two younger sons of Sir John Spencer (1524–1586) of Althorp, Northamptonshire.

The Baronetcy of Spencer of Yarnton was created on 29 June 1611 in the Baronetage of England for Thomas Spencer, Member of Parliament for Woodstock 1604–11, son of Sir William Spencer of Yarnton, Oxfordshire, the third son of Sir John Spencer, Kt. of Althorp. The third Baronet also represented Woodstock 1660–1679. The baronetcy was extinct on the death of the seventh Baronet as a minor in 1741.

The Baronetcy of Spencer of Offley was created on 14 March 1627 for John Spencer of Offley Place, Great Offley, Hertfordshire, the son of Sir Richard Spencer, the fourth son of Sir John Spencer, Kt. of Althorp. His sister Alice, who married Sir John Jennings of Sandridge, had 22 children, and was the grandmother of Sarah, 1st Duchess of Marlborough and of her cousin and political rival Abigail Masham. He died without male issue in 1633 and the Baronetcy was extinct, but was recreated on 26 September 1642 for his brother and heir Brocket Spencer. The fourth Baronet was member of parliament for Hertfordshire 1705–08. On his death the Baronetcy was extinct. His estate was inherited by his four daughters, and ultimately by his great-granddaughter who married Sir Thomas Salusbury

== Spencer of Yarnton (1611) ==
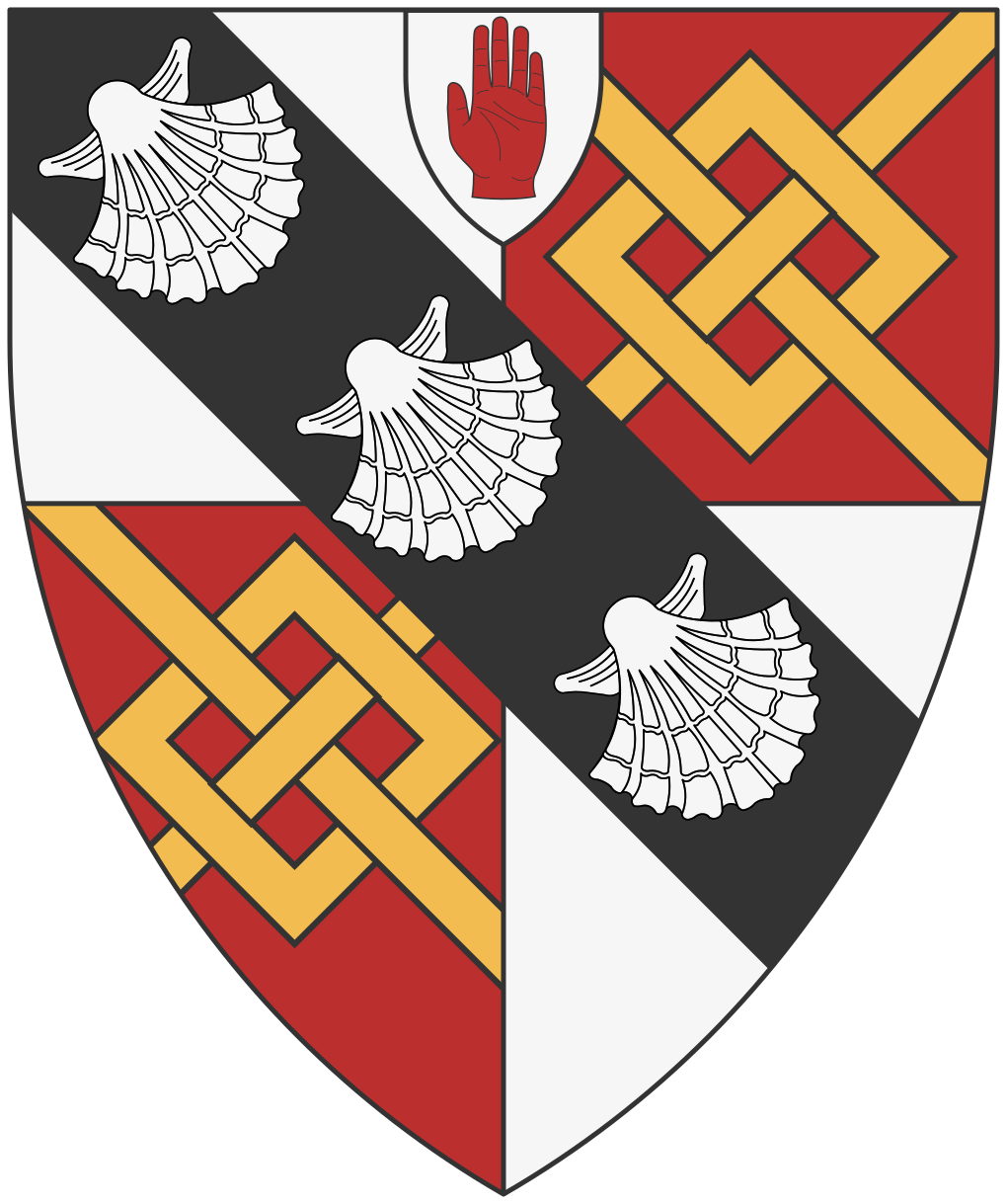
The coat of arms of the Spencers of Yarnton, and the Spencers of Offley

- Sir Thomas Spencer, 1st Baronet (1585–1622)
- Sir William Spencer, 2nd Baronet (1608–1647)
- Sir Thomas Spencer, 3rd Baronet (1639–1685)
- Sir Thomas Spencer, 4th Baronet (died 1722)
- Sir Henry Spencer, 5th Baronet (died 1726)
- Sir William Spencer, 6th Baronet (died 1735)
- Sir Charles Spencer, 7th Baronet (died 1741) Extinct on his death

== Spencer of Offley (1627, first creation) ==
Escutcheon of the Spencer baronets of Offley

- Sir John Spencer, 1st Baronet (died 1633)

== Spencer of Offley (1642), second creation) ==
- Sir Brocket Spencer, 1st Baronet (1605–1668)
- Sir Richard Spencer, 2nd Baronet (1647–1688)
- Sir John Spencer, 3rd Baronet (1678–1699)
- Sir John Spencer, 4th Baronet (1650–1712) Extinct on his death

== See also ==
- Spencer family
- Earl Spencer
- Duke of Marlborough (title)

Baronetage of England
Preceded by Fleetwood baronets	Spencer baronets 29 June 1611	Succeeded by Tufton baronets
