= Paul Winters =

Paul Winters may refer to:

- Paul Winters (American football) (born 1958), American college football coach
- Paul Winters (hurler) (born 1994), Irish hurler

== See also ==
- Paul Winter (disambiguation)
