= JDC International Centre for Community Development =

UK think tank

The JDC International Centre for Community Development
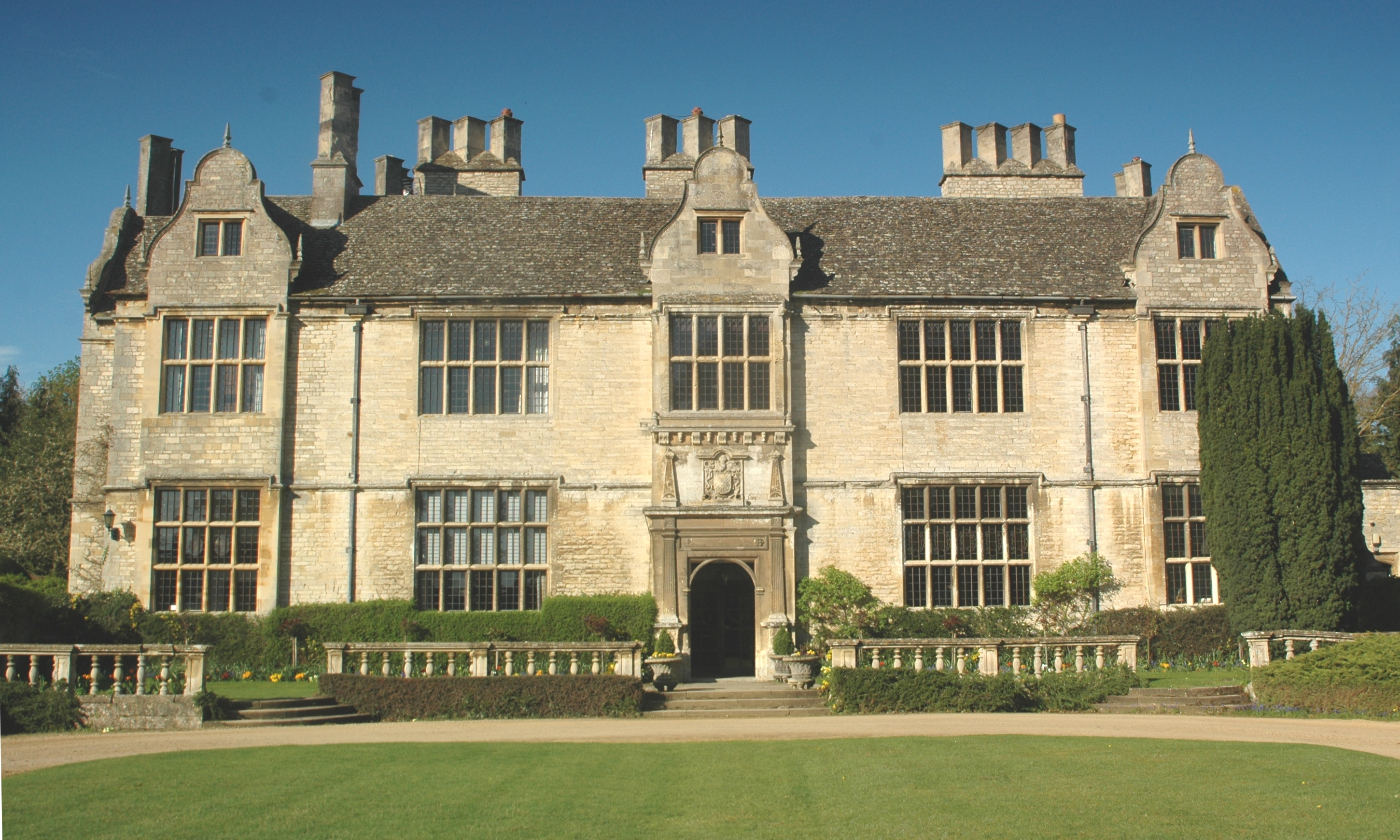
- Yarnton Manor, the seat of the JDC-ICCD at the University of Oxford
- Purpose: Research organisation and think tank
- Location: Oxford, United Kingdom
- Website: www.jdc-iccd.org

The JDC International Centre for Community Development (JDC-ICCD) is a research organization and think tank based in Oxford University, Oxford, United Kingdom. The charity, founded by the American Jewish Joint Distribution Committee (JDC), "is devoted to understanding and analyzing transformations in Europe and their impact on European Jewish communities."

The JDC-ICCD was founded 10 January 2005 to provide education and training, for religious activities, to prevent or relieve poverty, to encourage community and economic development, to perform or sponsor research, and to be an advocate.

== Activities ==
=== 2011 survey of European Jewish leaders ===
In 2011, Trinity College of Hartford, Connecticut, led by the American JDC-ICCD, conducted a survey of European Jewish leaders to ascertain concerns and challenges faced by European Jewish communities, including antisemitism, leadership, intermarriage and status issues, and Europe and Israel.

=== 2013 Berlin Conference ===
JDC-ICCD partnered with the American Jewish Committee's (AJC) Berlin Ramer Institute for German-Jewish Relations to host a conference October 25–27, 2013 titled "Analyzing Jewish Europe Today: Perspectives from a New Generation." Attendees and presenters gathered to discuss new Jewish cultural trends, Muslim-Jewish relations and Jewish revival in Eastern and Central Europe.

We know from our work on the ground that Europe's emerging Jewish leaders and communities are expressing Jewish identity in profoundly new and unique ways, setting an exciting course for the future of Jewish Europe. While there have been many forums examining Jewish identity of the past, for those of us dedicated to innovating Jewish life today, it was critical to focus on the contemporary European Jewish scene, bring to the fore issues impacting Jews across the continent, and ultimately seize the opportunities resulting from the way young European Jews are engaging with their Jewish identities.

— Marcelo Dimentstein, Operations Director of JDC-ICCD.
