= Yarnton =

Village in Oxfordshire, England

Coordinates: 51.811°N 1.310°W

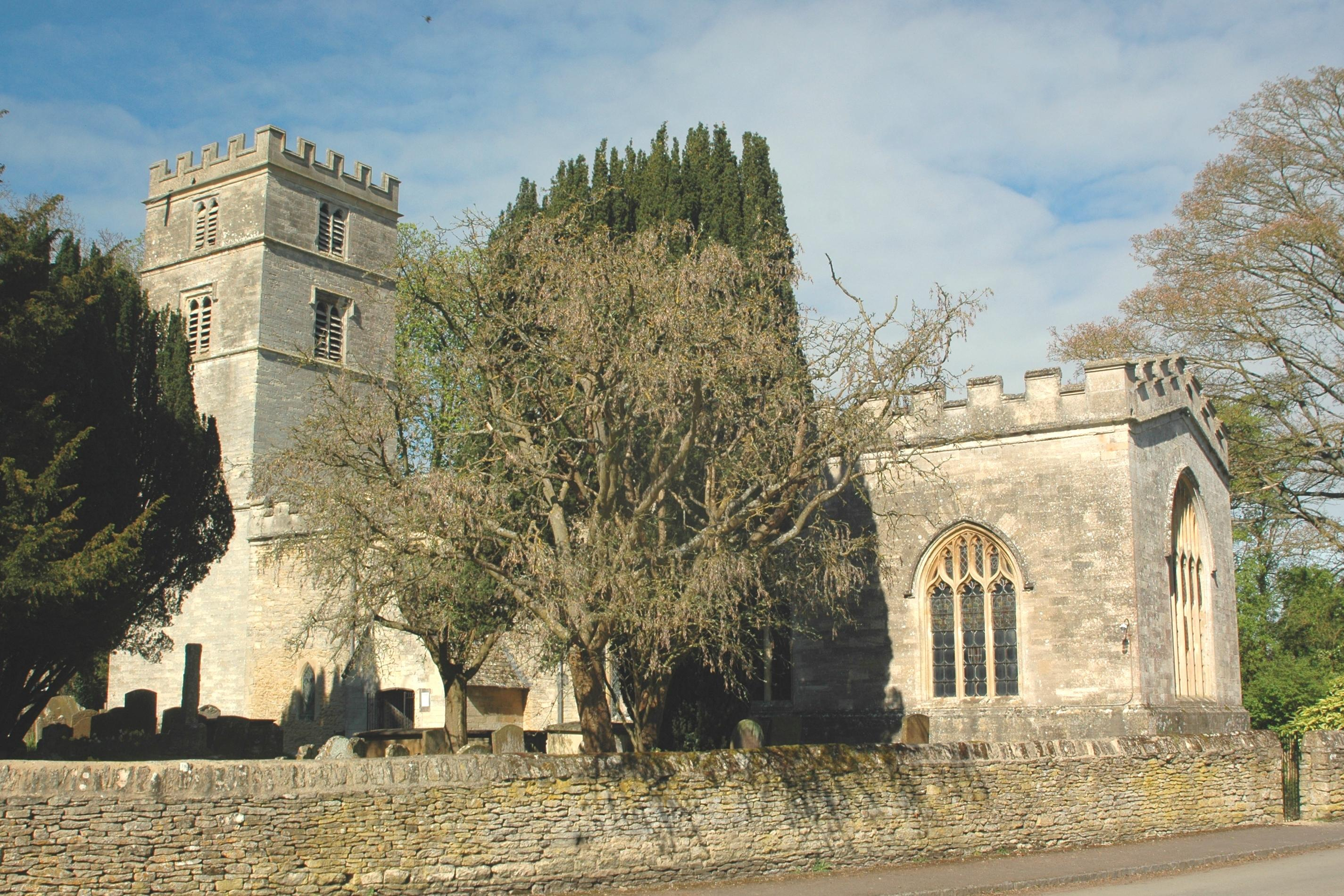
- St Bartholomew's parish church

- Location within Oxfordshire
- Population: 2,545 (2011 census)
- OS grid reference: SP4712
- Civil parish: Yarnton
- District: Cherwell
- Shire county: Oxfordshire
- Region: South East
- Country: England
- Sovereign state: United Kingdom
- Post town: Kidlington
- Postcode district: OX5
- Dialling code: 01865
- Police: Thames Valley
- Fire: Oxfordshire
- Ambulance: South Central
- UK Parliament: Bicester and Woodstock
- Website: Yarnton Village

Yarnton is a village and civil parish in Oxfordshire about 1 mile (1.6 km) southwest of Kidlington and 4 miles (6 km) northwest of Oxford. The 2011 census recorded the parish's population as 2,545.

== Archaeology ==
Early Bronze Age decorated beakers have been found in the parish. These suggest human activity in the area somewhere between 2700 and 1700 BC. A series of irregular late Iron Age to early Roman enclosures in the parish are known from cropmarks. Two are 10–12 metres (33–39 ft) across.

== Medieval settlement ==
The toponym has evolved from Erdington in Old English to Eyrynten in 1495–96, Yardington in the 16th century but also Yarnton from 1517. The form "Yarnton" eventually prevailed. Erdington may have originally meant either "dwelling place" or "Earda's farm". Most of the land at Yarnton was granted to Eynsham Abbey in 1005 but Remigius de Fécamp, a supporter of William the Conqueror, took it during the Norman Conquest of England in 1066. In 1226 King Henry III gave it to Richard, 1st Earl of Cornwall, and in 1281 Edmund, 2nd Earl of Cornwall gave it to Rewley Abbey. In the dissolution of the monasteries in 1536 Rewley Abbey was dissolved and King Henry VIII sold Yarnton to his physician, George Owen.

== Yarnton Manor ==
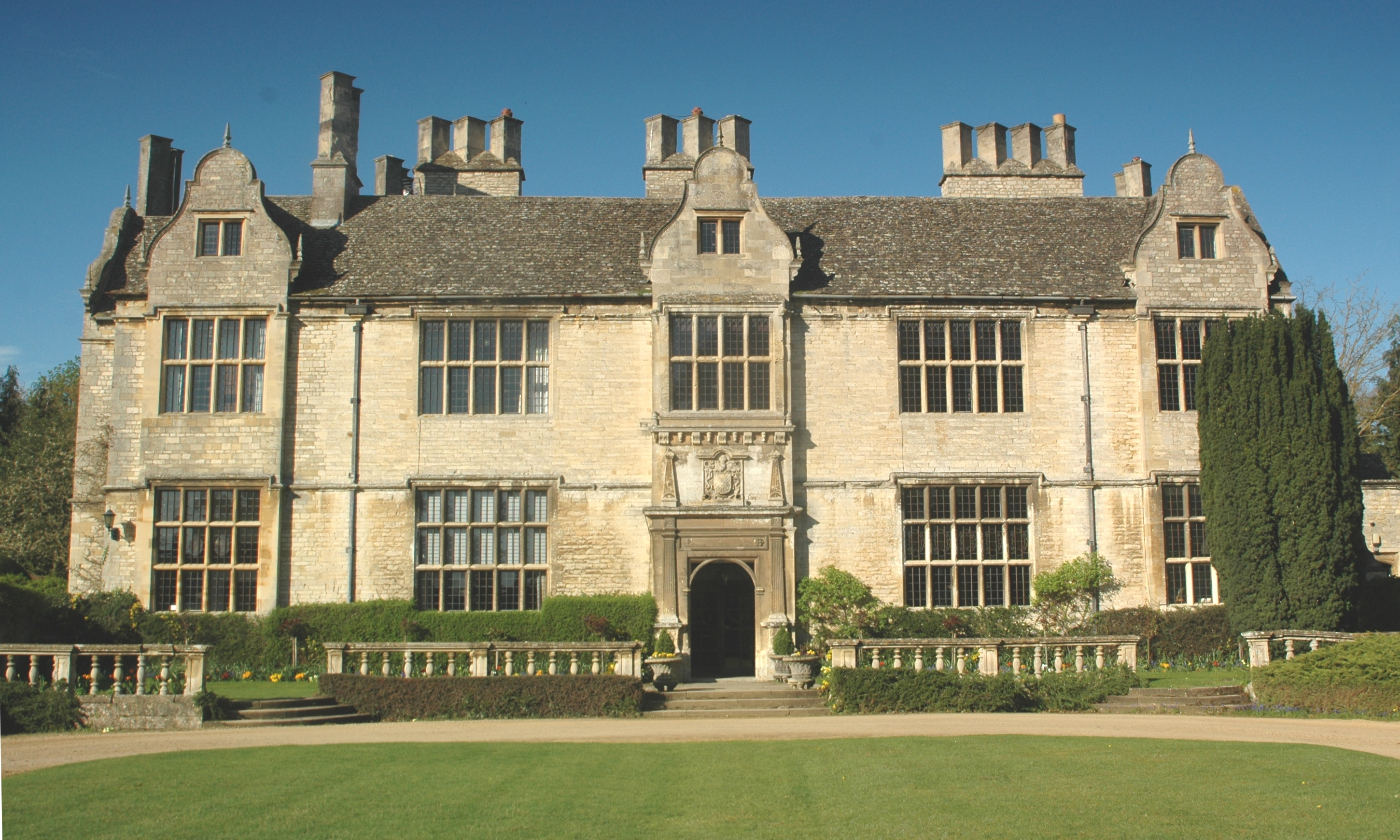
Yarnton Manor, built in 1611 for Sir Thomas Spencer

Yarnton Manor is a Grade II* listed Jacobean manor house with Grade II listed gardens. The foundation of the Manor dates from the Norman Conquest and was held by the Spencer family from 1580 to 1712.

Sir Thomas Spencer had the present manor house, a large Jacobean country mansion, built in 1611. During the English Civil War the house seems to have served as a Royalist military hospital: in 1643–1645 about 40 Royalist soldiers were buried in St Bartholomew's churchyard.

In about 1670 Sir Thomas Spencer, 3rd Baronet had the interior of the house remodelled. In 1695, a decade after his death, most of the manor's land was sold to Sir Robert Dashwood, who removed most of the stone of the house to build his own home at Kirtlington Park. In 1718 Yarnton manor house was reported to be in a "ruinated condition". The north and south wings were demolished, possibly in about 1756 by Sir Robert's successor Sir James Dashwood.

In 1897 the new owner, HR Franklin, engaged the Gothic Revival architect Thomas Garner who restored the remaining part of the house. In the 1930s the property belonged to George Alfred Kolkhorst, Reader in Spanish at Oxford University. More recently the house has been in institutional use. In about 1960 Cokethorpe School used it as a dormitory. Between 1975 and 2014 it was the headquarters of the Oxford Centre for Hebrew and Jewish Studies as well as the JDC International Centre for Community Development. In 2014 OCHJS decided to move closer to Oxford city centre. The house spent a number of years as the international study centre of the Oxford Royale Academy, but in the summer of 2021, the Manor sold at a price of £9 million to The Lanier Theological Education Foundation.

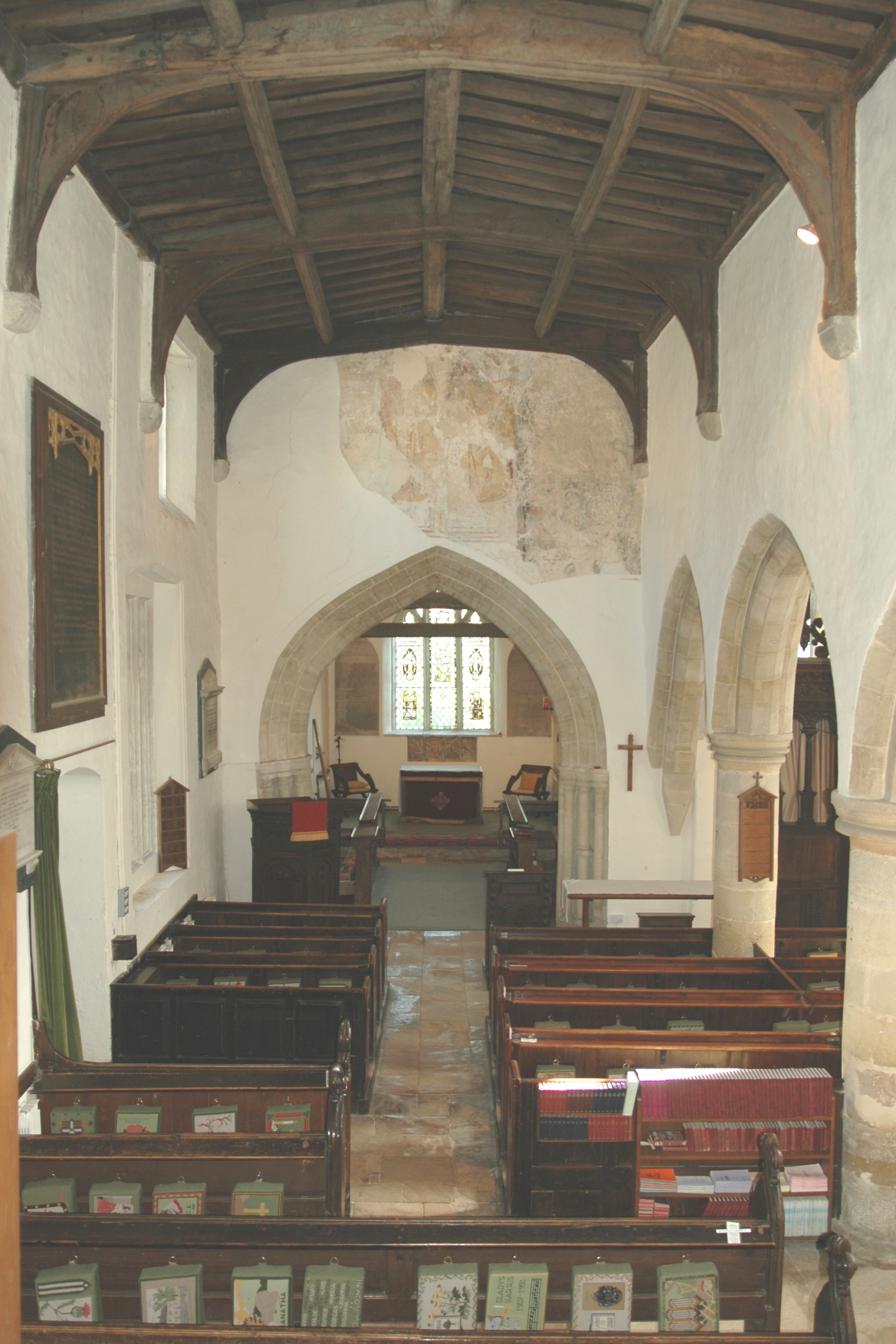
St Bartholomew's nave, showing Early English chancel arch and remains of a 15th-century wall painting

== Parish church ==
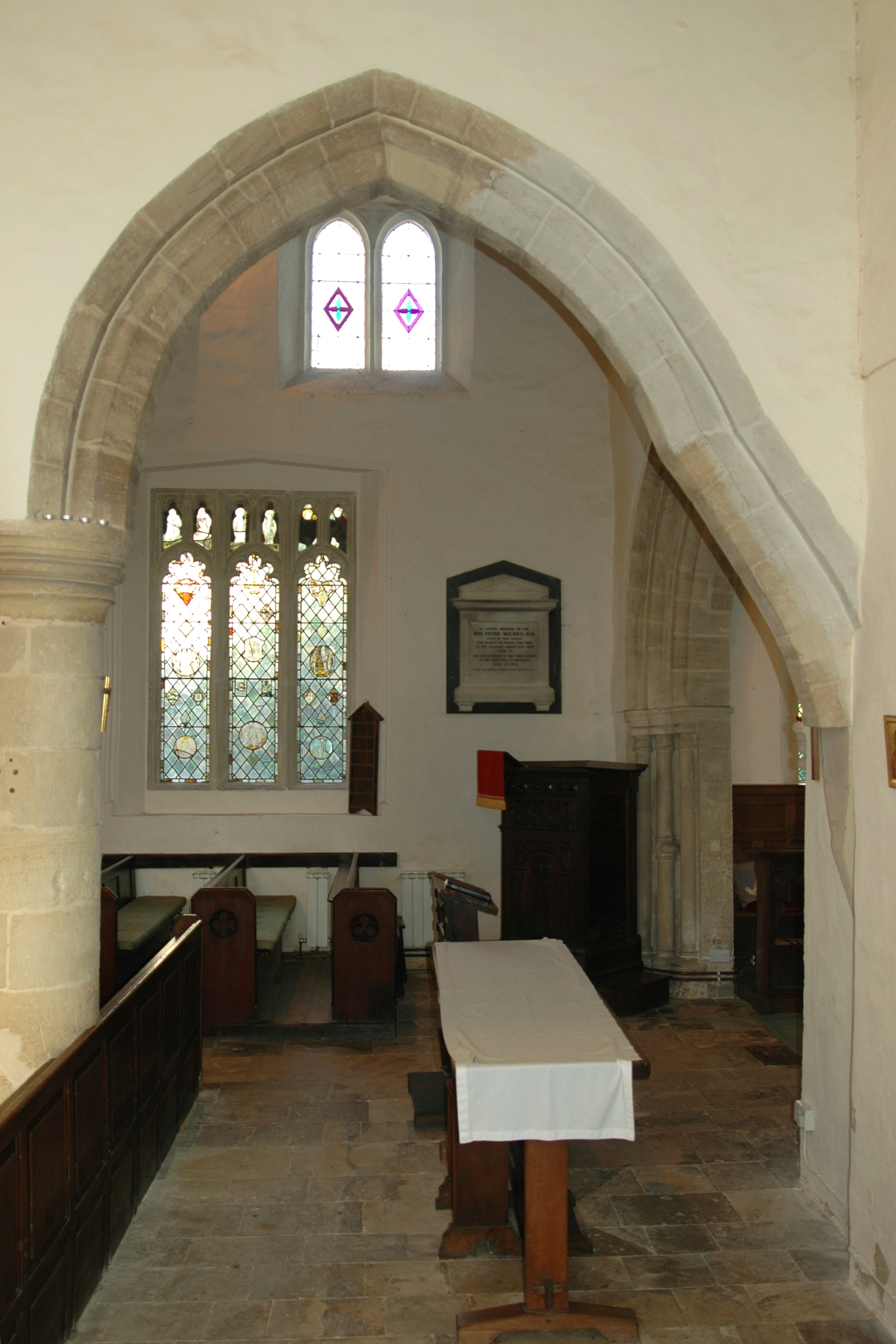
Irregular arch in the Early English arcade between St Bartholomew's nave and south aisle

The Church of England parish church of Saint Bartholomew was in existence by 1161 as a chapel attached to Eynsham Abbey. The Norman building from that period was completely rebuilt in the 13th century in the Early English Gothic style. The Perpendicular Gothic windows in the nave were added much later, followed by the clerestory in about 1600. Sir Thomas Spencer added the Spencer chapel, also Perpendicular Gothic, in 1611. The chapel houses monuments including Sir William Spencer (died 1609), Sir Thomas Spencer, 3rd Baronet (died 1684) and Charlotte Spencer-Churchill (died 1850). The chapel's windows contain heraldic stained glass representing branches of the Spencer family and are the largest collection of early 17th-century heraldic glass in Oxfordshire. The remains of 15th-century wall paintings including a Nativity are visible over the chancel arch. Above it are what may be remnants of a Massacre of the Innocents. Other paintings may survive under the current limewash, including what may be a large Saint Christopher over the north doorway.

Late in the 18th century Alderman William Fletcher of Oxford, who was born in Yarnton, gave St Bartholomew's six alabaster reliefs carved by a Nottingham sculptor in the 15th century and said to have been found during excavations near St Edmund Hall, Oxford. Four of the panels now form a reredos in the chancel. In the 1860s the other two were transferred to London: one to the British Museum and the other to the Victoria and Albert Museum. The windows of St Bartholomew's nave contain many examples of 15th- and 16th-century stained glass. A few of these were made for Yarnton, but most came from elsewhere and were given by William Fletcher between 1812 and 1816. St Bartholomew's has two baptismal fonts. Its original font is Norman, but William Fletcher added a second font, a Perpendicular Gothic one from about 1400, that was removed from St Michael at the North Gate parish church in Oxford.

St Bartholomew's bell tower was built in about 1611. One of its bells was cast in 1618 but William Taylor recast it in 1853, presumably at his Oxford foundry. Five more bells were cast in 1620 to complete the present ring of six: the tenor and one other by Henry I Knight of Reading, Berkshire but the treble and two other bells by another bell-founder, possibly Robert Atton of Buckingham. St Bartholomew's also has a Sanctus bell that William Yare of Reading cast in about 1611. St Bartholomew's had a 16th-century clock. In 1641 this was replaced with a new clock with a one-handed face. The new clock cost £5 18s 0d plus the scrap value of the old clock, and it took a whole week to install. Keeping the new clock running required frequent repairs, of which there are records from 1648, 1651, 1658, 1665, 1680, 1682, 1685, 1703, 1716 and 1730. The repair in 1703 was by the noted clockmaker John Knibb of Oxford.

== Economic and social history ==
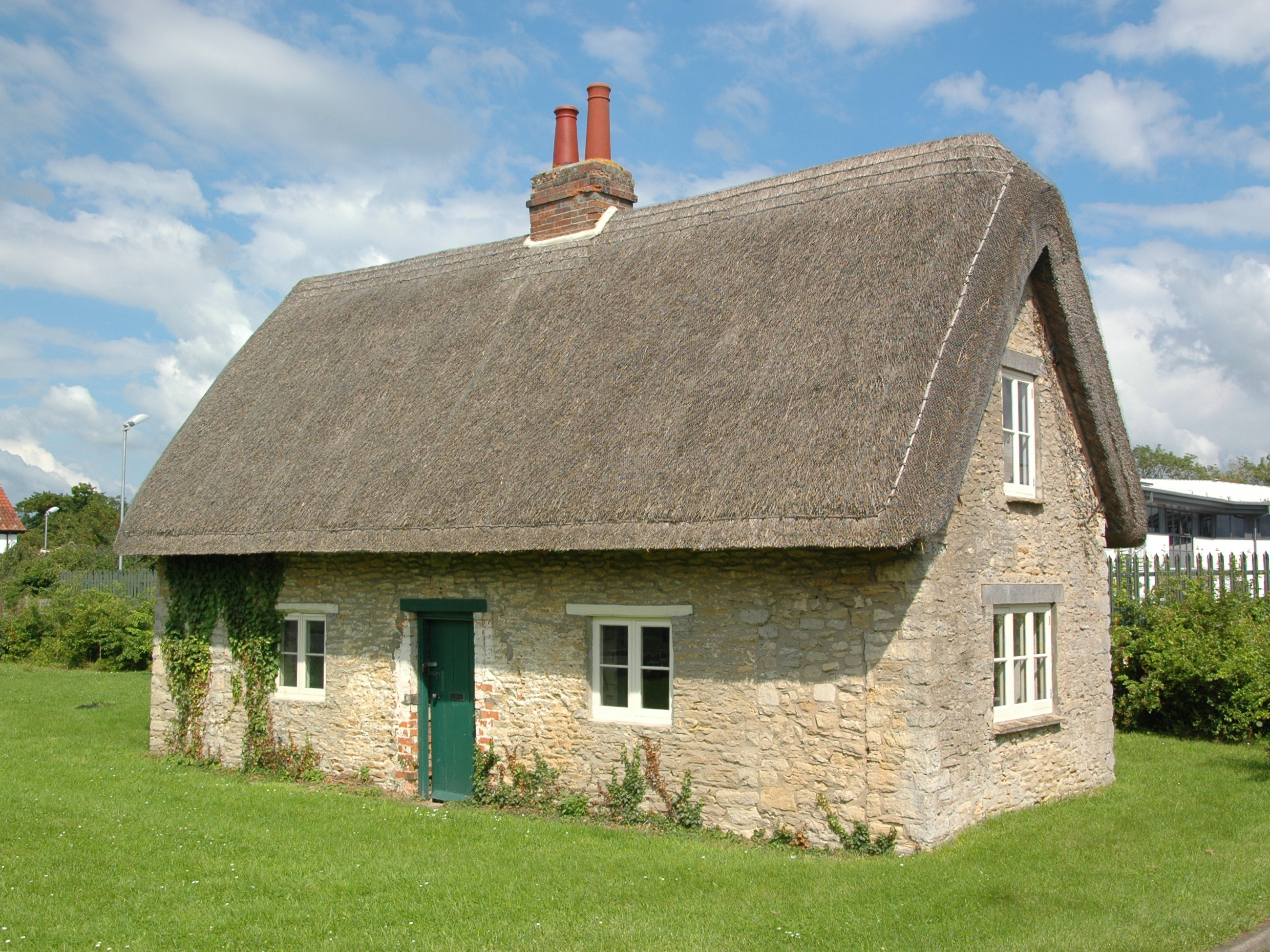
Quainton's Cottage in Cassington Road was built early in the 18th century. It is no longer occupied.

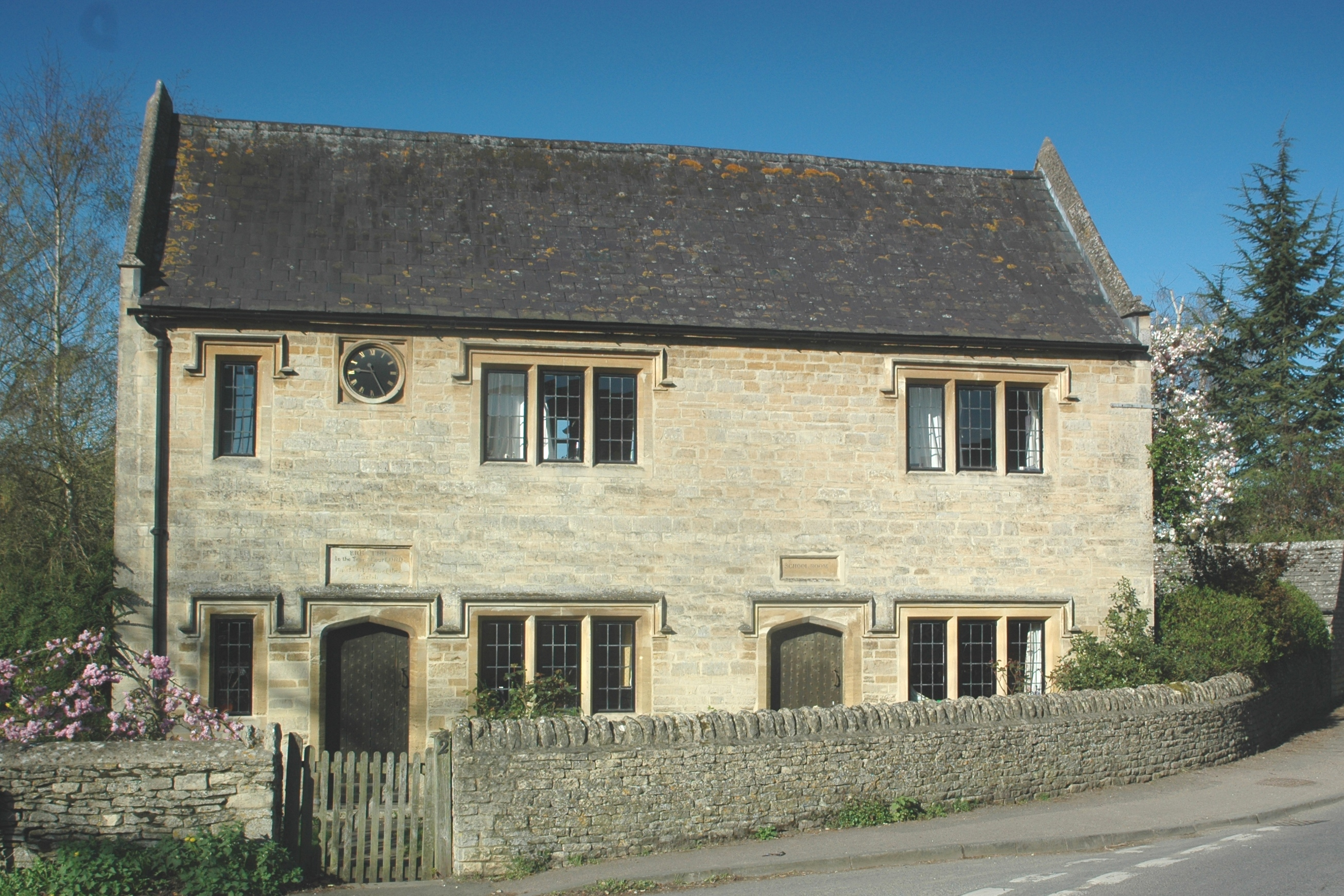
Tudor Revival former school building and parish clerk's house, built in 1817

Yarnton has had a licensed public house since at least 1587. The Six Bells Inn is reputed to have gained its name in 1620, about the time that St Bartholomew's acquired its ring of six bells (see above). The inn certainly bore this name by 1670. The Six Bells is no longer a public house but survives as a private house opposite the Red Lion. The main road between Oxford and Woodstock passes just east of the village. In 1719 it was made a turnpike and a toll house was built on Woodstock Road by the Turnpike public house (formerly called "The Grapes"). The road ceased to be a turnpike in 1878. It is now the A44 trunk road.

There had been sporadic attempts at educating the children of Yarnton since the 1580s, but none seems to have produced a school that endured and became established enough to have its own building. A Sunday school was founded in 1783 and a day school was added in 1814. William Fletcher paid for the school and Parish Clerk's house to be built in 1817. Despite its late Georgian date it is a neo-Tudor building, in keeping with both the character of Yarnton village and William Fletcher's antiquarian tastes. In 1831 the school became a National School. In 1875, the school moved to newly built larger premises in Church Lane. The new school buildings were extended in 1901. In 1932 the school was reorganised as a junior school, with senior pupils being transferred to the newly opened secondary school at Gosford. Yarnton school was enlarged again in 1955. In 1971 it moved to new premises in Rutten Lane and became the William Fletcher primary school The 1817 and 1875 school buildings are now private houses.

The Oxford and Rugby Railway passing just east of Yarnton opened in 1852 and the Oxford, Worcester and Wolverhampton Railway passing just south of the village opened in 1853. The two lines meet at Wolvercote Junction about 1 mile (1.6 km) south of the village. A railway just 1 1/4 miles (2 km) long linking the OW&WR at Yarnton Junction with the Buckinghamshire Railway near Water Eaton opened in 1854. Yarnton station was built at the end of Church Lane. In 1862 the Witney Railway opened, joining the OW&W Railway at Yarnton junction. In 1962 British Railways closed Yarnton station and withdrew passenger services between Oxford and Witney. In 1970 BR withdrew freight services from the former Witney Railway and dismantled the line. The OW&WR is now the Cotswold Line and the O&RR has been renamed the Oxford Canal Line.

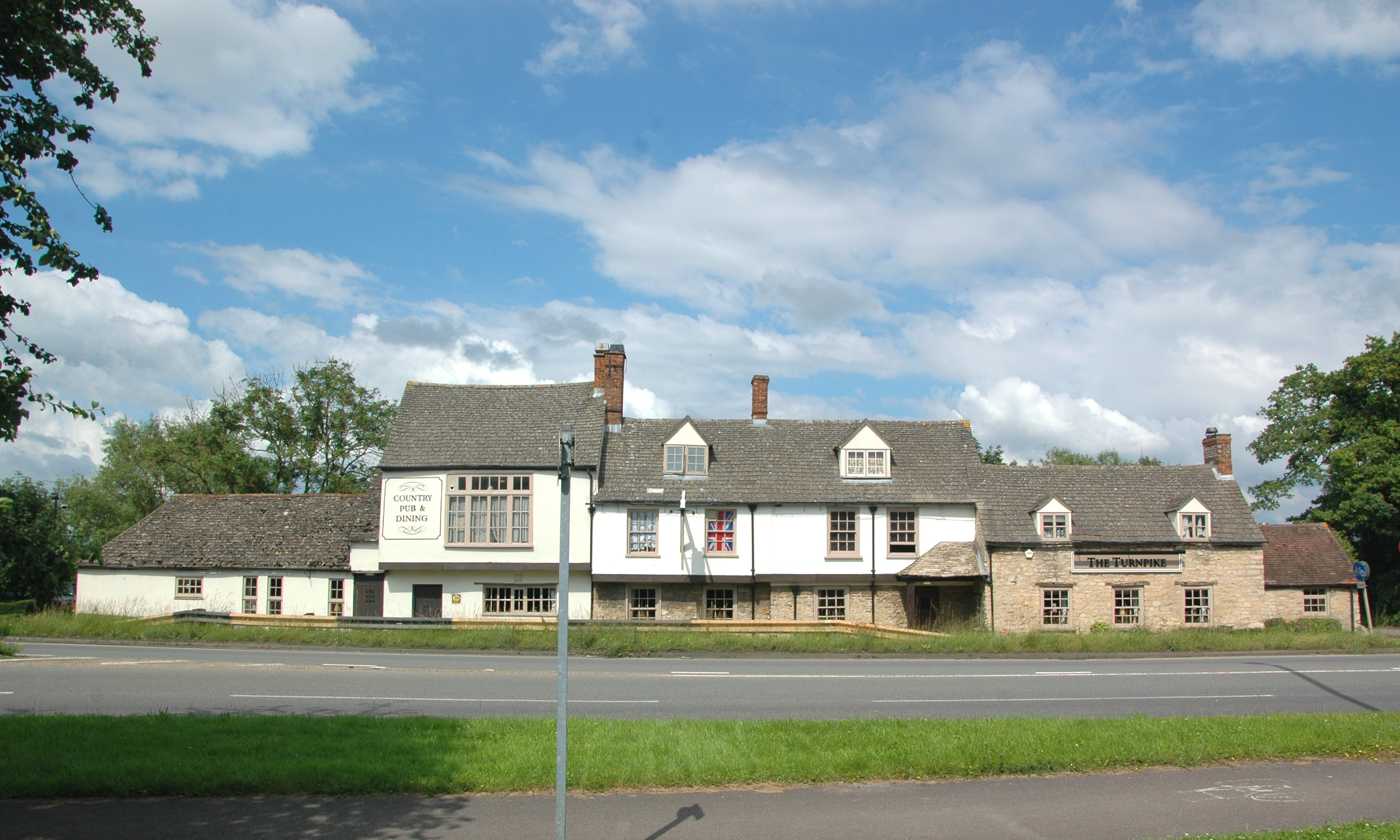
The Turnpike Inn, formerly The Grapes, was built as 17th- and 18th-century houses and later converted into a public house

== Amenities ==
Yarnton has two public houses: the Red Lion on Cassington Road and the Turnpike on the A44 Woodstock Road. The parish has a Women's Institute. Yarnton Football Club plays in the Oxfordshire Senior Football League. A separate youth football club, Yarnton Blues FC, plays in the Witney and District Youth Football League. Yarnton Band is a brass band founded in 1959. At its peak it competed in the national second section. The band continues to play and performs at local events. Yarnton has a Scout group located in the center of the village. In 2007 the village hosted the Festinho festival which raised money for Brazilian children. Woodland in the parish is now limited to lands around Yarnton Manor and the southwest side of the village, comprising mainly Spring Hill bordering the Duke of Marlborough's Bladon and Begbroke hunting forest. Pixey and Yarnton Meads were declared a Site of Special Scientific Interest for their flora and fauna in 1955.

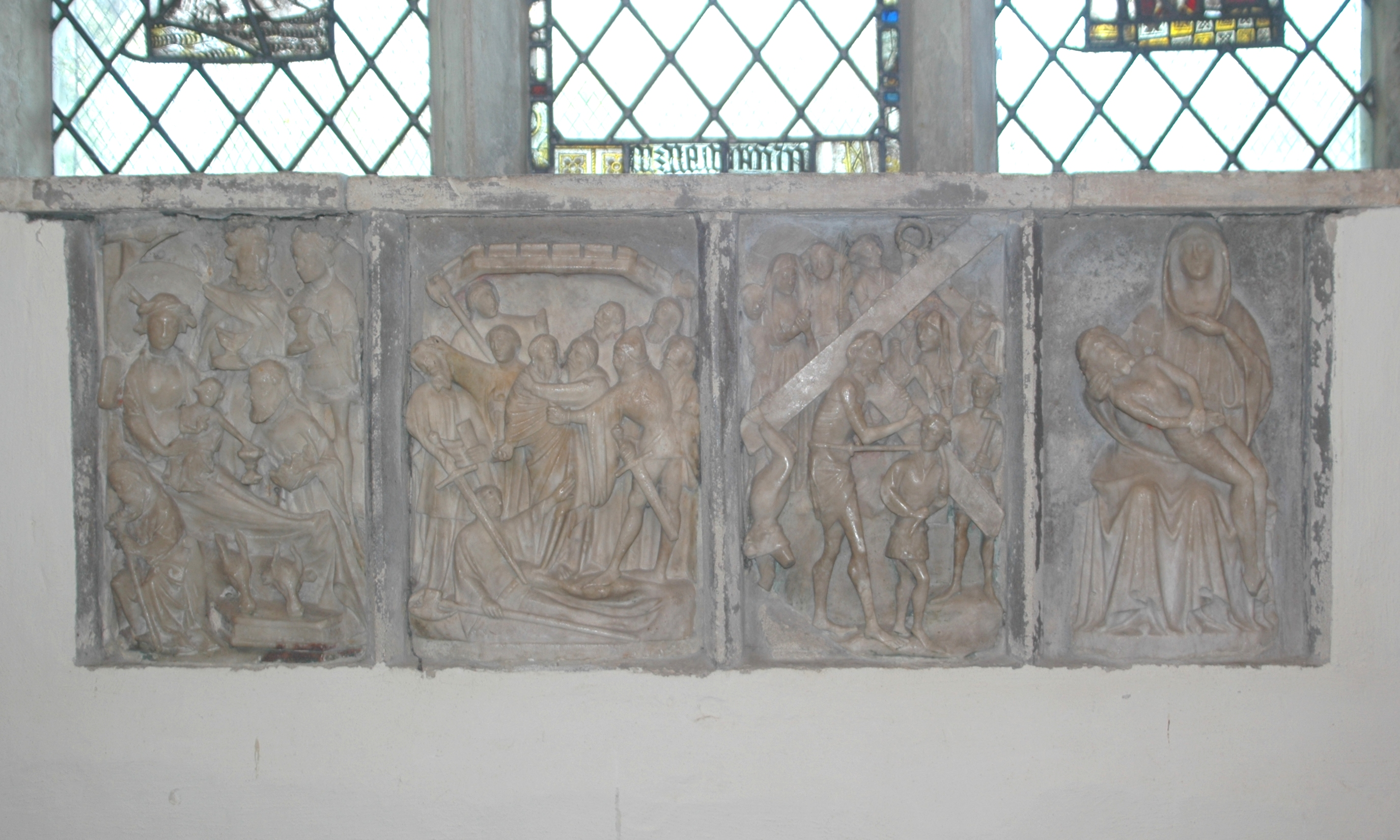
Reredos of 15th century alabaster panels that William Fletcher presented to St Bartholomew's late in the 18th century

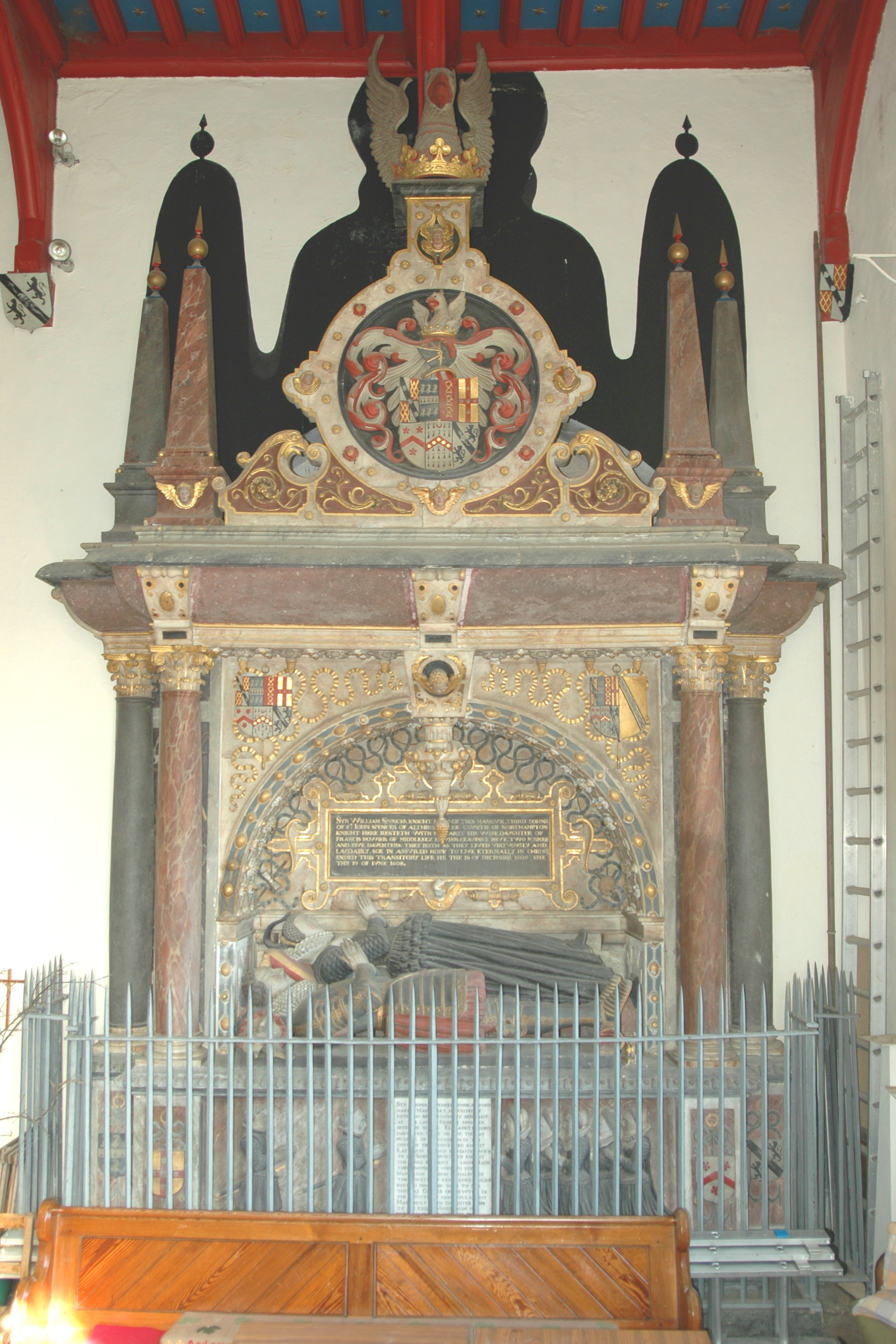
Jacobean Flemish monument to Sir William Spencer (died 1609) in the Spencer Chapel of St Bartholomew's

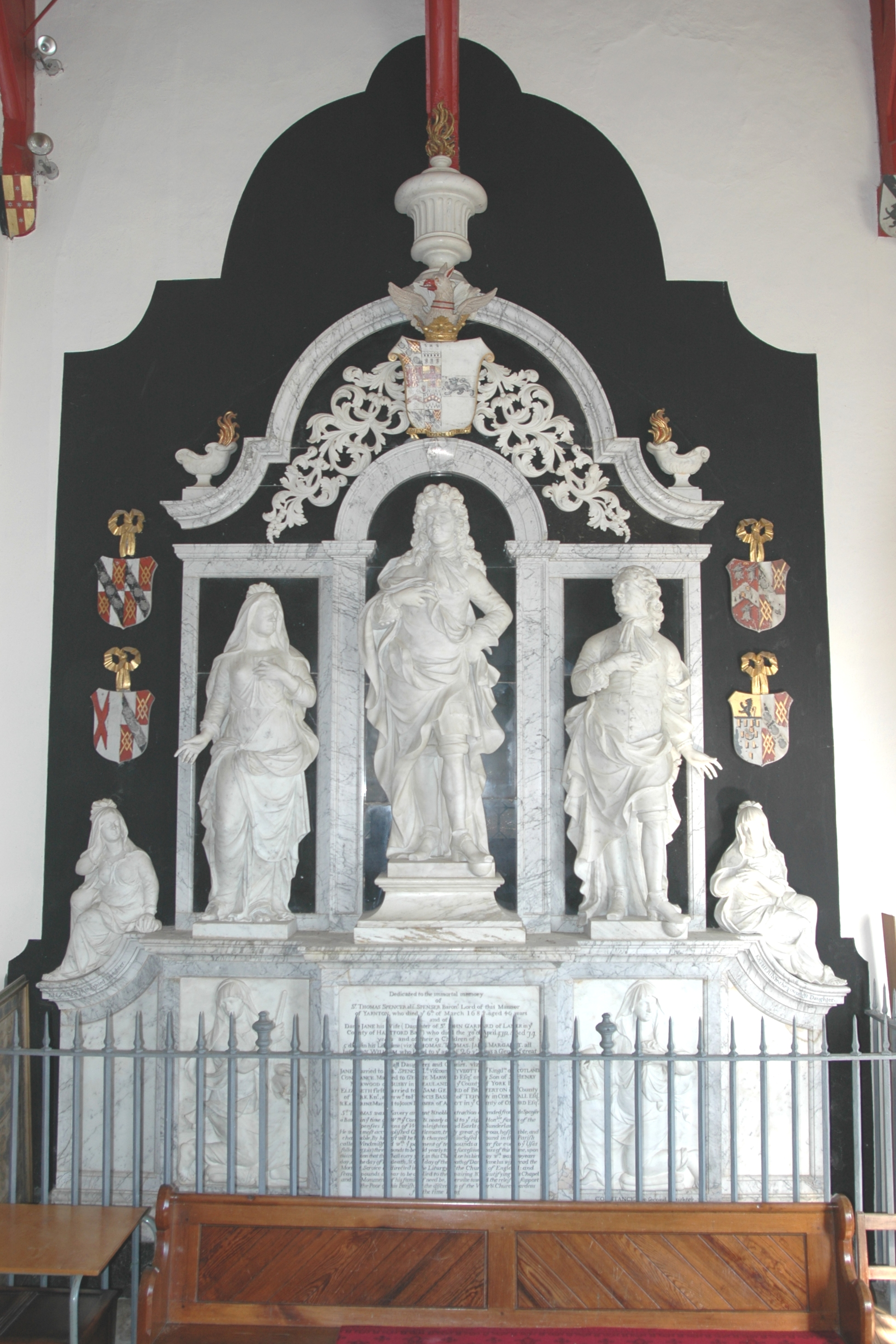
Baroque monument to Sir Thomas Spencer (died 1684) in the Spencer Chapel of St Bartholomew's

== Gallery ==
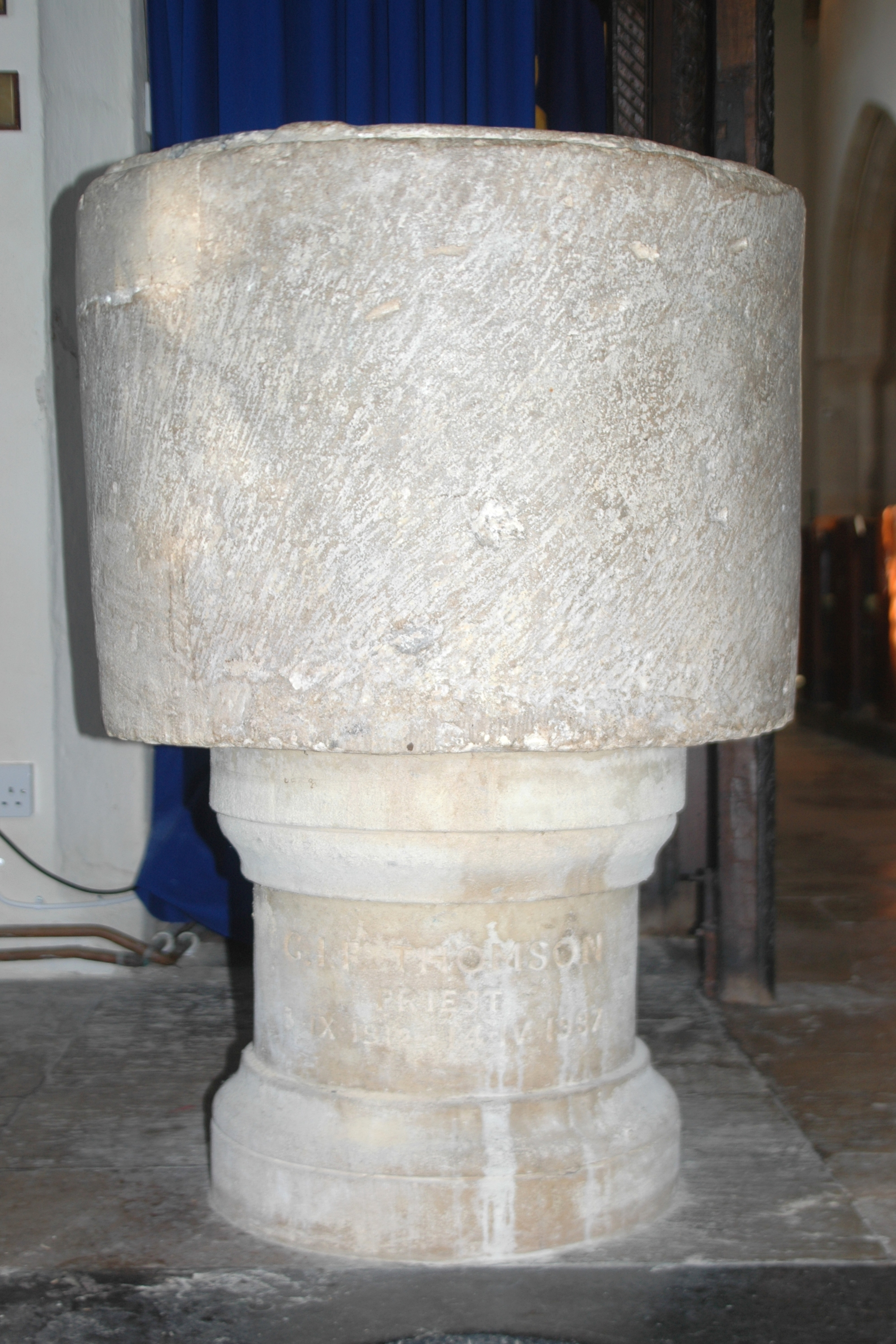
St Bartholomew's: Norman font

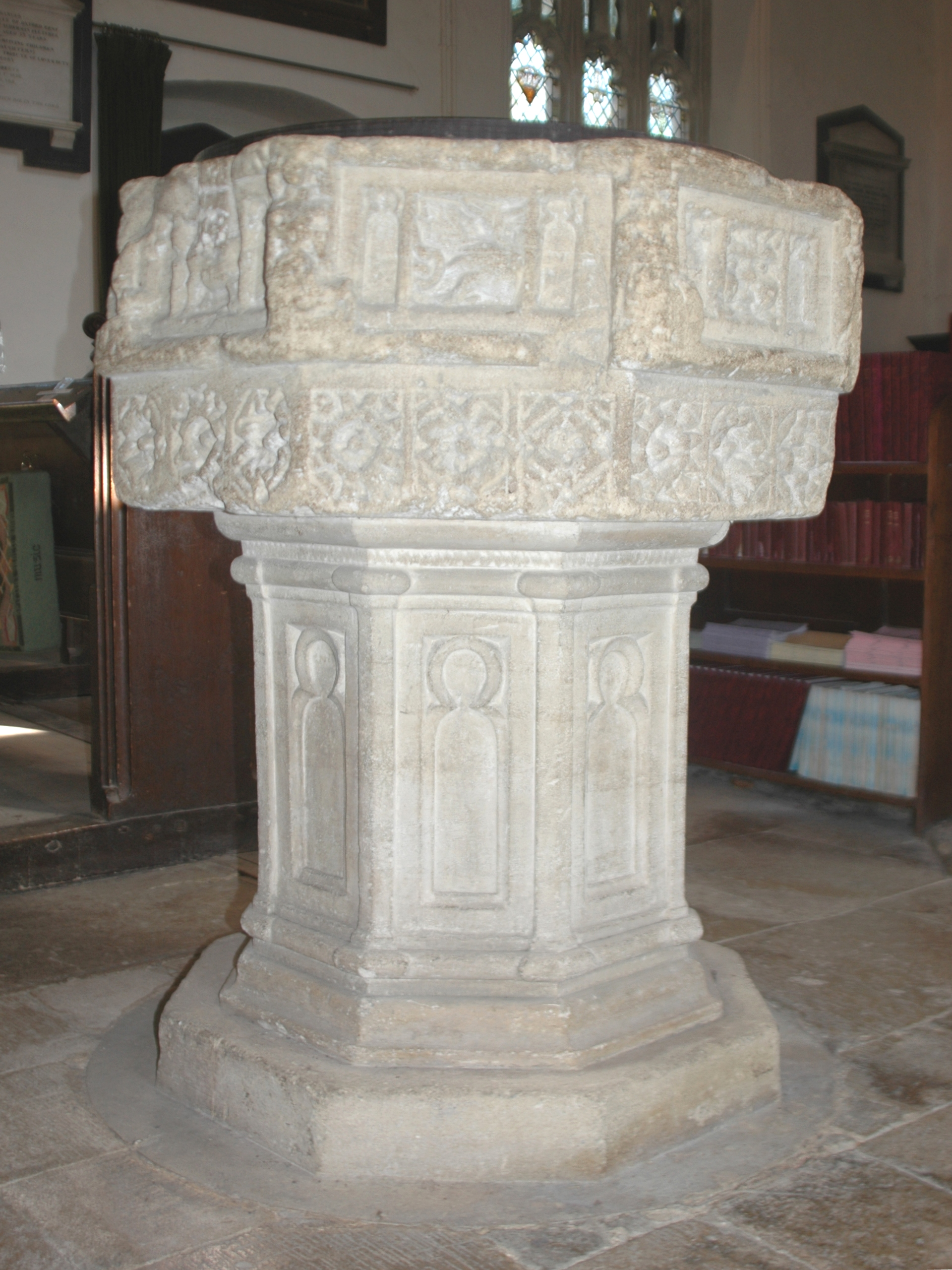
St Bartholomew's: Perpendicular Gothic font from St Michael at the North Gate, Oxford

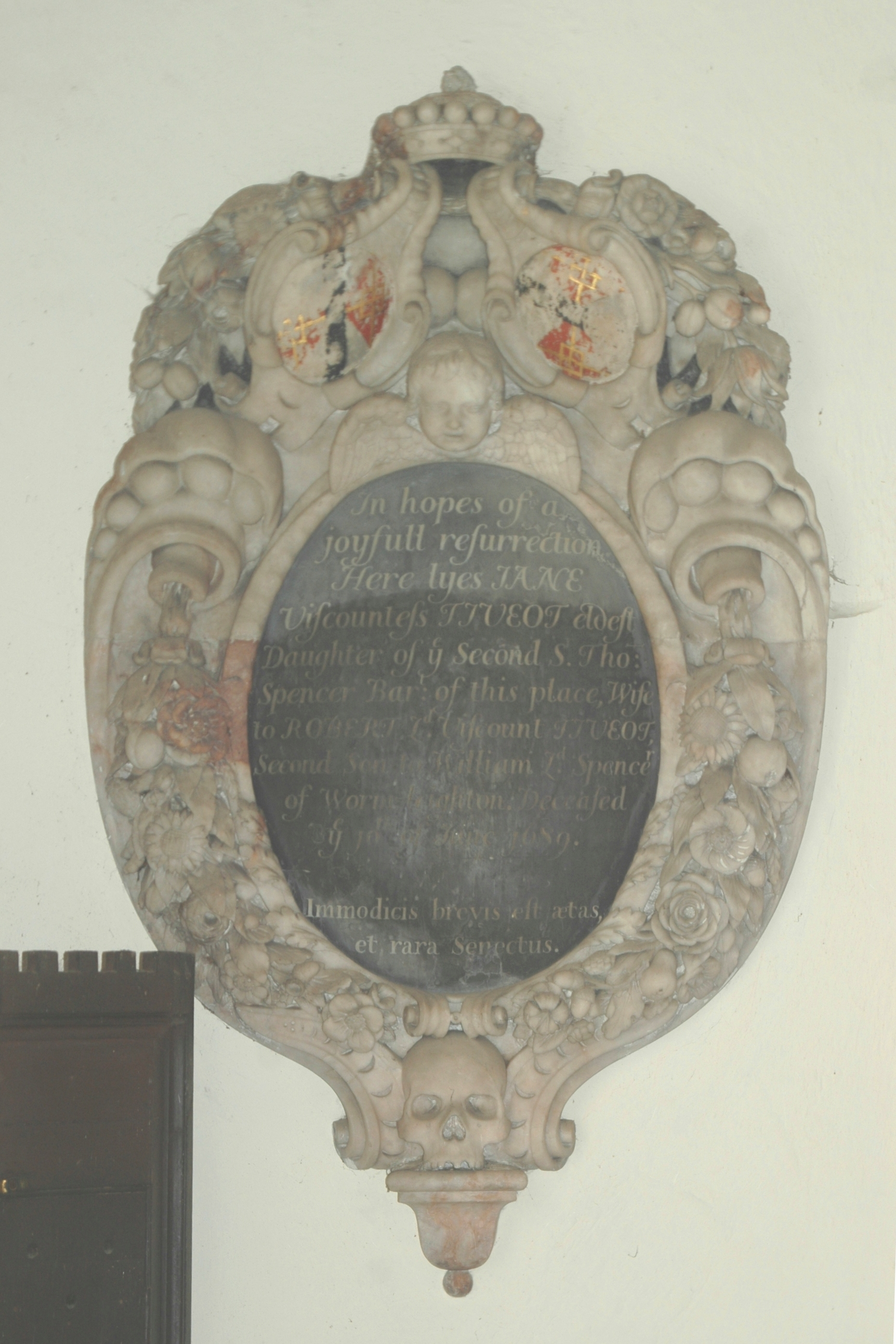
Baroque monument to Jane Spencer, Viscountess Tiveot (or Teviot) (died 1689)

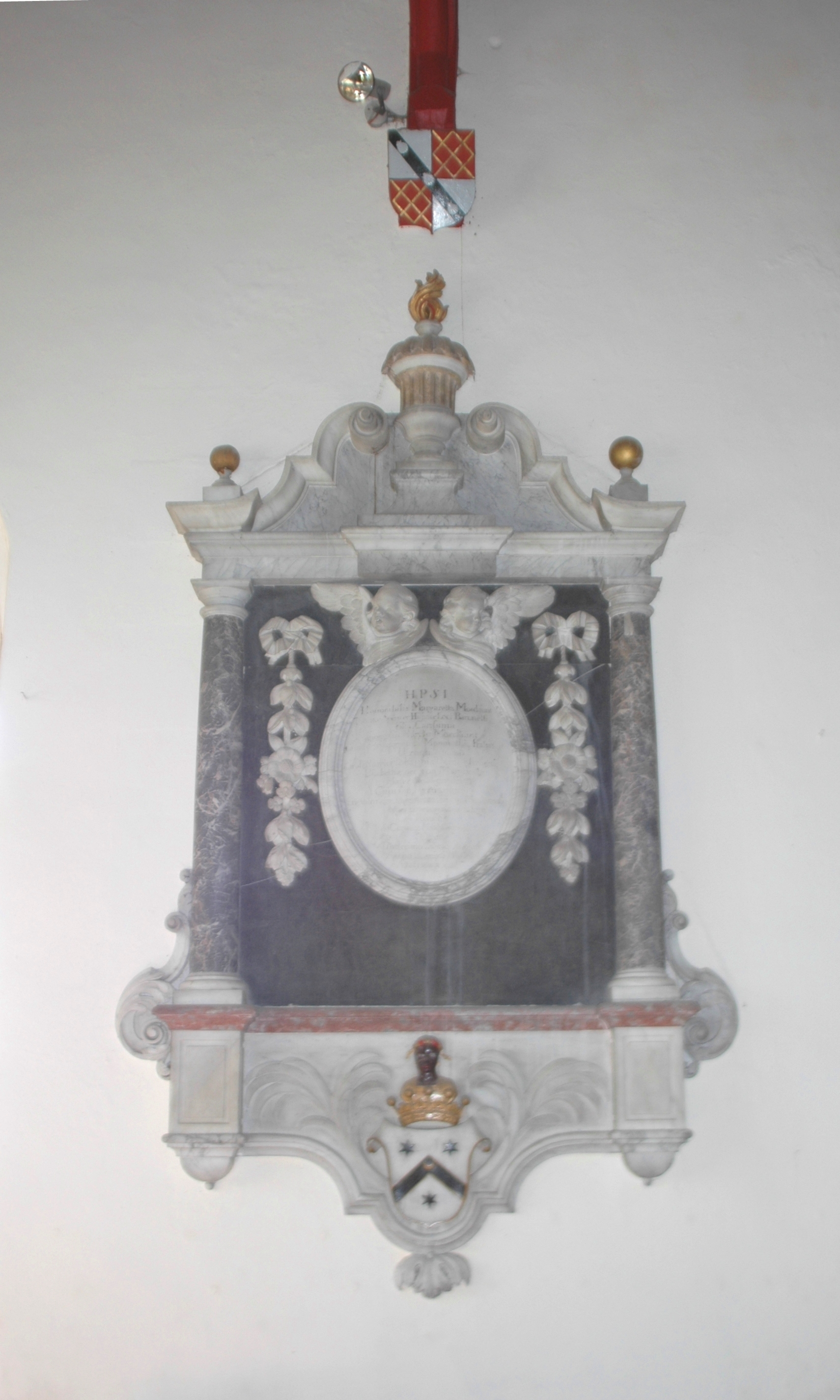
Monument to Elizabeth Mordant (or Mordaunt) (died 1706), daughter of the 2nd Earl of Peterborough

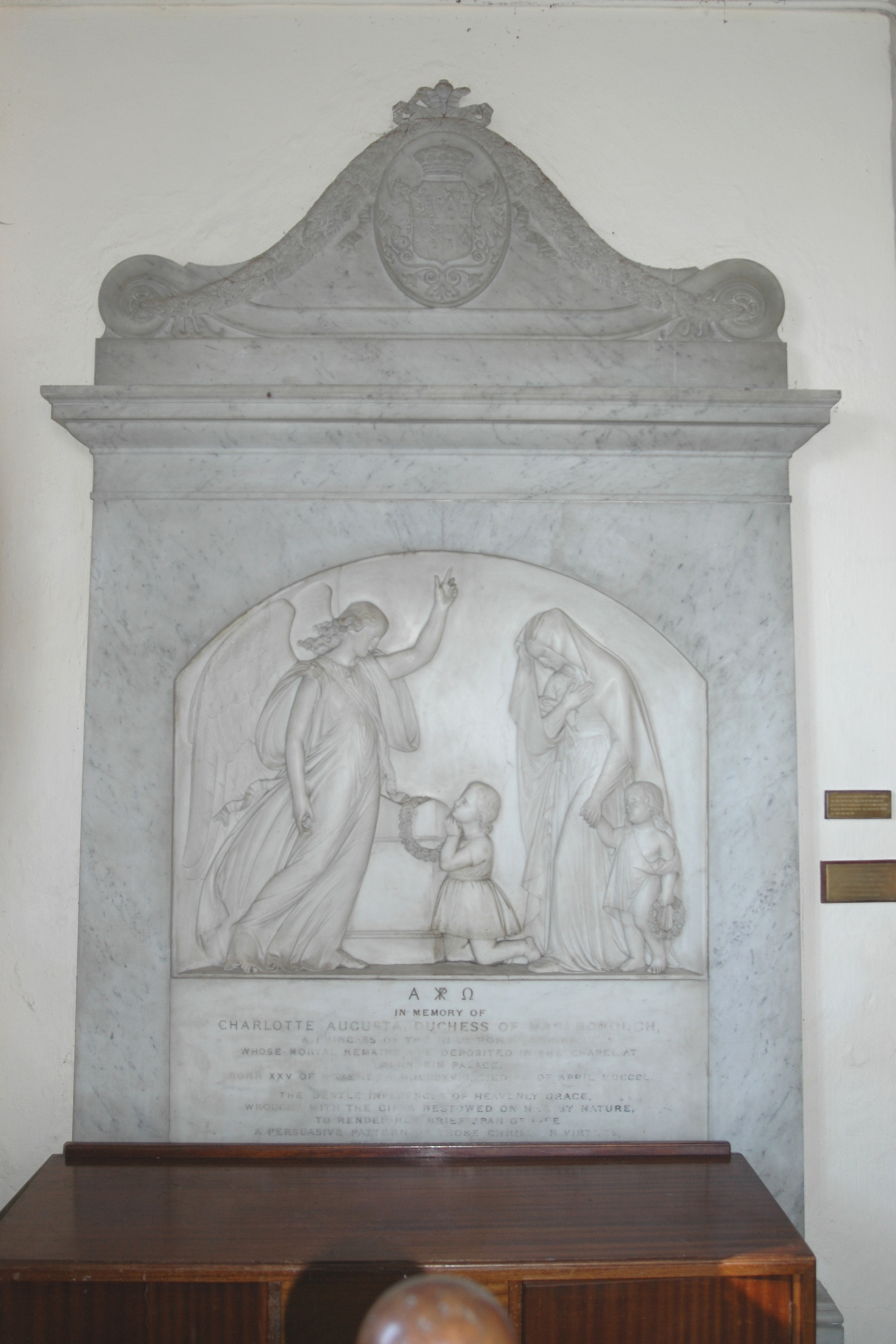
Victorian monument to Charlotte Spencer-Churchill, Duchess of Marlborough (died 1850) in the Spencer Chapel of St Bartholomew's

== Sources and further reading ==
- Beeson, CFC (1989) [1962]. Simcock, AV (ed.). Clockmaking in Oxfordshire 1400–1850 (3rd ed.). Oxford: Museum of the History of Science. pp. 20, 74–75. ISBN 0-903364-06-9.
- Booth, Paul (1997). "A Prehistoric–Early Roman Site near Lock Crescent, Kidlington". Oxoniensia. LXII. Oxfordshire Architectural and Historical Society: 21–49.
- Case, Humphrey (1956). "Beaker Pottery from the Oxford Region: 1939–1955". Oxoniensia. XXI. Oxford Architectural and Historical Society: 1–21.
- Crossley, Alan; Elrington, CR, eds. (1990). "Yarnton". A History of the County of Oxford. Victoria County History. Vol. 12: Wootton Hundred (South) including Woodstock. London: Oxford University Press for the Institute of Historical Research. pp. 470–489. ISBN 978-0-19722-774-9.
- Ekwall, Eilert (1960) [1936]. Concise Oxford Dictionary of English Place-Names (4th ed.). Oxford: Oxford University Press. ISBN 0198691033.
- Hey, Gill (2004). Yarnton: Saxon and Medieval Settlement and Landscape. Thames Valley Landscape Series. Vol. 20. Oxford: Oxford University School of Archaeology. ISBN 0-947816-70-4.
- Leeds, ET (1938). "Beakers of the Upper Thames District". Oxoniensia. III. Oxford Architectural and Historical Society: 7–30.
- Long, ET (1972). "Medieval Wall Paintings in Oxfordshire Churches". Oxoniensia. XXXVII. Oxfordshire Architectural and Historical Society: 86–113.
- Sherwood, Jennifer; Pevsner, Nikolaus (1974). Oxfordshire. The Buildings of England. Harmondsworth: Penguin Books. pp. 864–868. ISBN 0-14-071045-0.
