= Jesus the Jew =

1973 book by Geza Vermes

- Author: Geza Vermes
- Publisher: Collins
- Publication date: 1973
- Pages: 286 pp.
- ISBN: 978-0-00-215373-7
- OCLC: 612199537

Jesus the Jew: A historian's reading of the Gospels (1973) is a book by Géza Vermes, who was a Reader in Jewish Studies at the University of Oxford when it was written. It was originally published by Collins in London.

== Review citations and excerpts ==
- Review: Publishers Weekly, September 13, 1993, volume 240, issue 37, page 36
- Review: The Christian Century, September 16, 1981, volume 98, page 916

"Fortress picked this book up from the dying Collins firm; it has a 1973 publication date in England. The author has written on the Dead Sea Scrolls, but in this book his main interest is to give a Jewish Portrait of Jesus in his environment. Elaborate reference materials at the back of the book reinforce his arguments and lead readers beyond his significant beginnings. His Jesus is a very recognizable zaddik, a just man, a teacher, an exemplar."

- Review: CHOICE: Current Reviews for Academic Libraries May 1979, page 406
- Review: CHOICE: Current Reviews for Academic Libraries October 1974, page 1157
- Review: Library Journal, January 1, 1979, volume 104, page 116
- Review: Library Journal, July 1974, page 1832
- Review: Interpretation April 1976, page 206
- Review: The Journal of Religion January 1976, page 134
- Review: Commonweal, December 6, 1974, page 244
- Review: America, July 27, 1974, page 38
- Review: The Christian Century June 5, 1974, page 620

"Already regarded as a turn-in-the-road book, this historical study eschews most theological elements and jolts Christian readers into relocating Jesus in his original Jewish environment. Positive thinking about an often forgotten context; readable by nonspecialists."

- Review: Encounter March 1974, page 64
- Review: Times Literary Supplement December 7, 1973 page 1516
