= Peter Oppenheimer (economist) =

British economist

Peter Morris Oppenheimer (born April 16, 1938) is an economist and fellow of Christ Church, Oxford, with a particular interest in Russian economic policy. Appointed in the late 1960s, his work focuses on financial markets, the economics of transition and energy. He has also worked as Chief Economist at Shell.

== Career ==
From 2000–2008 he was Director of the Oxford Centre for Hebrew and Jewish Studies, and is currently an emeritus governor.

He has represented western investors on the boards of several Russian companies.

He has been a governor for St Clare's, Oxford for several decades.

== Campaigns ==
He campaigns against:

- the hegemony of administrators in British universities.
- government control of British universities
- declining academic standards in British education.
