= Paul Winter (writer) =

Czech barrister and writer (1904–1969)

Paul Winter (1904–1969) was a Czech barrister and writer. He was a successful barrister in Czechoslovakia but fled in 1939 due to the Nazi takeover (he was a Jew), became a British soldier.

== Biography ==
While performing research at libraries in London Winter worked menial jobs such as a porter and died in 1969 in London, in poverty, after having published around a hundred articles in scholarly journals concerning earliest Christianity. Winter's 1961 book On the Trial Of Jesus, received hundreds of reviews, because it detailed critical analysis of the evidence regarding the trial of Jesus, from the standpoint of the legal practices which were applied during the 1st century, analyzed according to Jewish Law, and separately according to Roman Law.

Winter's general conclusion was that Jesus was tried, and ultimately convicted and crucified, solely for his having violated Roman Law, sedition, because he claimed to be the king of the Jews, despite Rome's having appointed the Herodian family to that post. Crucifixion was solely a Roman form of execution, for sedition and other serious violations of Roman Law. Jewish Law did not employ crucifixion, not even for crimes which were capital offenses under Jewish Law.

== Bibliography ==
- Paul Winter, On the Trial of Jesus. Berlin: Walter de Gruyer, 1961 (second revised edition edited by T.A. Burkill and Geza Vermes, Berlin: Walter de Gruyer, 1974).
