= Warwickshire Militia =

British military unit (active 1558–1953)

Warwickshire Militia 3rd & 4th Battalions, Royal Warwickshire Regiment
- Active: 1558–1 April 1953
- Country: England (1558–1707); Kingdom of Great Britain (1707–1800); United Kingdom (1801–1953)
- Branch: Militia/Special Reserve
- Role: Infantry
- Size: 1–2 Battalions
- Part of: Royal Warwickshire Regiment
- Garrison/HQ: Budbrooke Barracks, Warwick
- Engagements: English Civil Wars; Irish Rebellion of 1798; Second Boer War

Commanders
- Notable commanders: Basil Feilding, 6th Earl of Denbigh; Francis Ingram-Seymour-Conway, 2nd Marquess of Hertford; Henry Greville, 3rd Earl of Warwick; Harry McCalmont

The Warwickshire Militia (Note: There is no consistency in the sources as to whether the regiment was the 'Warwick' or 'Warwickshire' Militia, both forms being used indiscriminately.) was an auxiliary military force in the English Midlands county of Warwickshire. From their formal organisation as Trained Bands in 1572 and their service during the Armada Crisis and in the English Civil War, the Militia of Warwickshire provided internal security and home defence during times of international tension and all of Britain's major wars, relieving regular troops from routine garrison duties and acting as a source of trained officers and men for the Regular Army. It later formed two battalions of the Royal Warwickshire Regiment that both served in the Second Boer War and prepared thousands of reinforcements for the fighting battalions of the regiment in World War I. After 1921 the militia had only a shadowy existence until its final abolition in 1953.

== Early history ==
The English militia was descended from the Anglo-Saxon Fyrd, the military force raised from the freemen of the shires under command of their Sheriff. It continued under the Norman kings as the Posse comitatus. The force was reorganised under the Assizes of Arms of 1181 and 1252, and again by King Edward I's Statute of Winchester of 1285.

Under this statute 'Commissioners of Array' would levy the required number of men from each shire. The usual shire contingent was 1000 infantry commanded by a millenar, divided into companies of 100 commanded by centenars or constables, and subdivided into platoons of 20 led by vintenars. (John E. Morris, the historian of Edward's Welsh Wars writing in 1901, likened this process to calling out the Militia Battalion of the county regiment.) King Edward I made use of this mechanism in this Welsh and Scottish campaigns. As an inland county Warwickshire avoided most of these demands, but King Edward II called the first national levy in July 1322 for his failed Scottish campaign. Thereafter Warwickshire provided soldiers for all six national levies between 1322 and 1338, including the Siege of Berwick and the Battle of Halidon Hill, in 1337–8 for the Siege of Dunbar, and for service in Flanders in 1338.

== Warwickshire Trained Bands ==
The legal basis of the militia was updated in Queen Mary I's reign with two acts of 1557 covering musters (4 & 5 Ph. & M. c. 3) and the maintenance of horses and armour (4 & 5 Ph. & M. c. 2). The county militia was now under the Lord Lieutenant, assisted by the Deputy Lieutenants and Justices of the Peace (JPs). The entry into force of these acts in 1558 is seen as the starting date for the organised county militia in England.

Although the militia obligation was universal, it was clearly impractical to train and equip every able-bodied man. After 1572 the practice was to select a proportion of men for the Trained Bands (TBs), who were mustered for regular training. When war broke out with Spain training and equipping the militia became a priority. From 1584 counties were organised into groups for training purposes, with emphasis on the invasion-threatened 'maritime' counties. However, the inland counties like Warwickshire were given little priority. The Armada Crisis in 1588 led to the mustering of the TBs in April. They were put on one hour's notice in June and called out on 23 July as the Armada approached. The Warwickshire TB foot (600 men) joined Lord Hunsdon's army at Tilbury defending the Queen and together with the Worcestershire, Leicestershire and Huntingdonshire TBs formed Sir Henry Goodere's Regiment, 2100 strong.

In the 16th Century little distinction was made between the militia and the troops levied by the counties for overseas expeditions. Between 1589 and 1601 Warwickshire supplied almost 1,400 levies for service in Ireland, France or the Netherlands. Levies were allowed nine days to march from Warwick to Bristol for embarkation. However, the counties usually conscripted the unemployed and criminals rather than the Trained Bandsmen – in 1585 the Privy Council had ordered the impressment of able-bodied unemployed men, and the Queen ordered 'none of her trayned-bands to be pressed'. Replacing the weapons issued to the levies from the militia armouries was a heavy cost on the counties. As Lord Lieutenant of Warwickshire, William Compton, 1st Earl of Northampton, personally supervised the levying of 250 men in the county for Ernst von Mansfeld's expedition in December 1624 to relieve the Siege of Breda.

In the early days training was taken seriously: the Earl of Northampton encouraged the formation of an 'Artillery Yard' at Coventry at the beginning of the 17th Century, in imitation of the Honourable Artillery Company and other London groups, where TB officers could learned the basics of their role. But with the passing of the threat of invasion, the TBs declined in the early 17th Century. Later, King Charles I attempted to reform them into a national force or 'Perfect Militia' answering to the king rather than local control. The deputy lieutenants in Warwickshire were lax about holding musters, and the captains of Troops and Companies were younger sons and lesser gentry rather than the leading men of the county. In 1616 the Troop of Horse had been commanded by Sir Thomas Lucy, Member of Parliament (MP) for Warwickshire, but by young Robert Lee of Billesley in 1635. There was one company from each of the four Hundreds into which the county was divided, commanded in 1635 by:

- Barlichway, around Stratford-upon-Avon – Thomas Combe
- Hemlingford or Coleshill – Peter Burgoyne
- Kineton – Thomas Newsham
- Knightlow around Southam– John Shuckburgh

In 1638 the Warwickshire TBs mustered 600 foot armed with 357 muskets and 243 corslets (body armour, signifying pikemen), and 88 Cuirassiers. As a city, Coventry was autonomous from the county of Warwickshire, and was obstructive about raising its TB in 1638–9. It owed two horsemen to the Warwickshire Troop, and one-fifteenth of the Foot.

In the First Bishops' War of 1639, 230 men were levied from Warwickshire, mainly labourers and husbandmen, but few were trained bandsmen. For the Second Bishops' War in 1640, Warwickshire was ordered to muster 500 trained bandsmen and march them to Newcastle upon Tyne. Once again many of those sent on this unpopular service would have been untrained replacements and conscripts. Many of them bribed the 'conducting officers' to release them before they reached Newcastle, others simply deserted or even attacked their officers. In Warwickshire Lieutenant-Colonel Thomas Lunsford and his officers had to defend themselves with force, killing and wounding some of their attackers.

=== Civil Wars ===
Control of the trained bands was one of the major points of dispute between Charles I and Parliament that led to the First English Civil War. On 12 February 1641 one of the Parliamentary leaders, Robert Greville, 2nd Lord Brooke, of Warwick Castle, was appointed as 'a fit person to be entrusted with' organising the trained bands of Warwick and the County and City of Coventry, and he was appointed by Parliament as Lord Lieutenant of Warwickshire to replace Spencer Compton, 2nd Earl of Northampton in April 1642. From June Brooke as lord-lieutenant and Northampton armed with the King's commission of array, vied to raise the TBs for their respective parties. About 25 June, Northampton tried to win over the Coventry magistrates and seize the county TB armoury, but was forced to withdraw. Brooke countered by holding TB musters at Stratford-on-Avon, (30 June) Warwick (1–2 July), Coleshill (4 July) and Coventry (5 July): although few of the junior officers attended, parliamentary supporters claimed that nearly all of the trained bandsmen and many volunteers appeared. Brooke had mustered the men from Knightlow Hundred at Warwick rather than Southam because the latter town was considered 'malignant' by the parliamentary supporters. Robert Lee failed to have Brooke and William Purefoy, the former MP for Coventry, indicted by the Warwick Grand Jury for illegally mustering the TBs. Brooke also removed the TB magazine from Coventry and lodged it in his own Warwick Castle, for which Parliament authorised a garrison and sent some artillery. Later in July, Northampton countered by mustering Royalist volunteers under his commission: he had plenty of supporters among the country gentlemen, and he used his volunteers to disarm opponents. He gained control of the cannon intended for Warwick Castle and set them up in the town to bombard the castle into submission. In the absence of Brooke, the castle was held by Edward Peyto with perhaps only 22 soldiers, who defied Northampton. Northampton again summoned the TBs, to assist in the siege, but few responded, perhaps only those from Tanworth-in-Arden.

Now that open warfare had broken out, both sides needed paid full-time forces for campaigning, though the TBs remained active and often served as night guards and town garrisons. The main field armies of both sides gathered in the Midlands, and the Royalists made another failed attempt to seize Coventry; this may have involved the TBs they had called out, while the defenders included the trained bandsmen from Birmingham. On 23 August the local Parliamentary forces under Brooke fought a skirmish (the 'Battle of Southam') against the Royalists under Northampton, which again may have involved some of the trained bandsmen.

After the Battle of Edgehill the opposing field armies left Warwickshire, and during the winter Brooke as commander of the Parliamentary Association of Staffordshire and Warwickshire began raising regular troops, while Coventry and Warwick (castle and town) were garrisoned. The four companies of Colonel Godfrey Bosvile's Regiment of Foot provided the garrison of Warwick town, supplemented by a 'Town Company', probably part-time trained bandsmen. Certainly trained bandsmen from the outlying parishes were serving in Warwick in June 1643. The Town Company was commanded by Captain John Halford who also commanded a company of Bosville's Regiment. The Town Company took part in a raid on Lark Stoke House near Admington on 8 February 1645 under Major John Bridges, commander of the Warwick Castle garrison.

After the Parliamentary victory, new Militia Acts in 1648 and 1650 replaced Lords Lieutenant with county commissioners appointed by Parliament or the Council of State. From now on the term 'Trained Band' began to disappear in most counties. The Warwickshire Militia in 1650 were organised into a horse regiment under William Purefoy and two foot regiments commanded by Colonels Joseph Hawkesworth and Edward Peyto. William Purefoy, an MP, had commanded a regiment of Warwickshire Horse during the First Civil War. One of the regicides, he went on the serve as a member of the Council of State. Hawkesworth had served as major of Purefoy's Horse, and was governor of Warwick Castle from 1649. He also sat in the second Protectorate Parliament. Peyto was another MP, and had previously been lt-col of the Earl of Denbigh's Warwickshire Regiment of Horse.

During the Scottish invasion of England in 1651 the Warwickshire Militia were ordered to rendezvous at Northampton in August and missed the Battle of Worcester.

During the Commonwealth and Protectorate, the county militia regiments were used to support the New Model Army in controlling the country for the regime. After Cromwell's death, moderate Parliamentarians including Robert Greville, 4th Lord Brooke gained control of the Warwickshire Militia and were able to secure Coventry and Warwick for the restored Rump Parliament, the first step towards the Restoration of the Monarchy. Colonel Hawkesworth was closely associated with Brooke's family and Brooke thought that he could persuade Hawkesworth to hand Warwick Castle over to the moderate officers of the militia. This approach failed, and Brooke removed Hawkesworth from the governorship. Later the Warwickshire Militia searched for arms used in John Lambert's abortive rebellion. When the Warwickshire Militia mustered in October 1660 following the Restoration, the old Parliamentarian officers had been dropped form the list of officers, and the militiamen from the parishes were supplemented by volunteer Troops and Companies composed of gentry. One of these Troops was directly commanded by the new lord lieutenant, James Compton, 3rd Earl of Northampton. The following year Northampton and the militia demolished the gates and walls of Coventry, which had been the most republican town in the county throughout the civil wars.

== Restoration Militia ==
After the Restoration the English Militia was re-established by the Militia Act 1661 (13 Cha. 2 St. 1. c. 6) under the control of the king's lords lieutenant, the men to be selected by ballot. This was popularly seen as the 'Constitutional Force' to counterbalance a 'Standing Army' tainted by association with the New Model Army that had supported Cromwell's military dictatorship, and almost the whole burden of home defence and internal security was entrusted to the militia. They were frequently called out during the reign of King Charles II; for example, the Warwickshire Militia Horse went 'cheerfully' to join a strategic cavalry reserve when there was an invasion threat in June 1666 during the Second Anglo-Dutch War. The regiments were dispersed to their homes on 6 August following the victory at the St. James's Day Battle.

A national muster of the militia was called in 1697. Under the lord lieutenant, George Compton, 4th Earl of Northampton, the forces of Warwickshire comprised a foot regiment of six companies totalling 585 men commanded by Col Sir Charles Shuckburgh, 2nd Baronet, together with three Troops of Horse (one newly raised) totalling 174 men under Capts Sir William Underhill, Arden Baggot and George Lucy. In addition Coventry had a half company of 40 foot and 7 horse which could be attached to the county militia.

The Militia passed into virtual abeyance during the long peace after the Treaty of Utrecht in 1712, although some were called out during the Jacobite risings of 1715 and 1745: Warwickshire and Staffordshire tried to extemporise a force in 1715 on the basis of the old posse comitatus.

== 1757 Reforms ==
Under threat of French invasion during the Seven Years' War the Militia Act 1757 (30 Geo. 2. c. 25) reorganised the county militia regiments, the men being conscripted by means of parish ballots (paid substitutes were permitted) to serve for three years. In peacetime they assembled for 28 days' annual training. There was a property qualification for officers, who were commissioned by the lord lieutenant. An adjutant and drill sergeants were to be provided to each regiment from the Regular Army, and arms and accoutrements would be supplied when the county had secured 60 per cent of its quota of recruits.

Warwickshire's quota was set at 640 men. The Midlands was not directly threatened with invasion and was generally unenthusiastic about forming its militia regiments; Warwickshire however was unusually prompt and its regiment was formed and issued with its arms on 28 March 1759. The Earl of Hertford as Lord Lieutenant was able to send in a complete list of officers and 636 men on 12 June. Each of the nine companies had a local connection within the county. The senior officers were Col Basil Feilding, 6th Earl of Denbigh, Lt-Col the Hon George Shirley, Maj Sir Roger Newdigate, 5th Baronet, MP, and Sir Henry Parker, 5th Baronet, as senior captain. The regiment was embodied for permanent service on 6–7 July.

From August to October 1759 the regiment was stationed at Salisbury, and Denbigh and his officers took part in the social life of the cathedral city. The men were given permission to take paid work to bring in the harvest, but this was prevented by wet weather. In October the regiment was distressed to learn that it was to be sent to the notoriously sickly Hilsea Barracks at Portsmouth for the winter. The Norfolk Militia stationed there that summer had suffered badly from Smallpox, Dysentery and Typhus, and the men from isolated country villages with little immunity succumbed in large numbers. There were cries of 'No barracks' from the Warwickshires when they heard they were to go there. To protect them from infection the barracks were freshly whitewashed and fumigated, and the bedding washed, though Denbigh insisted on completely fresh bedding. It was also agreed that the sickly Norfolks would be moved out before the Warwickshires arrived, but this was not complied with, and the first case of smallpox appeared in the Warwickshires almost immediately. In September Maj Newdigate dosed two of his feverish men with 'James' Powder', and they recovered. The commander at Portsmouth, Lieutenant-General Henry Holmes, attributed the fuss made by the Warwickshires to a desire to escape guard duty. Nevertheless, Denbigh, who was a friend of the Secretary at War, Viscount Barrington, got his regiment moved out and it spent the winter in and around Winchester and Southampton.

Once settled the regiment got down to training. The detachment at Romsey used a close owned by the mayor, then a meadow, and finally the churchyard. In May 1760 the regiment formed its Grenadier Company from picked men from the 'battalion companies'. In the summer of 1760 it was part of a large militia concentration at Winchester. The duties included guarding French prisoners of war. In October most of the militia regiments were sent back to their own counties to allow the men home leave, and the Warwickshires spent the winter of 1760–61 in their home area. On marching out the following spring many of the men got drunk and were late on parade, and the first day's march was ill-disciplined. In May–July 1761 the regiment was stationed at Leicester, close to Maj Newdigate's home, and he employed some of the men in road-building. At the end of July it joined a militia camp at Warley, near Brentwood, Essex. In May 1762 Maj Newdigate was using some of his men to level some ground near his house, and the regiment spent that summer at Worcester, which was a pleasant social centre. However, peace negotiations were under way, and the militia were stood down before the end of the year.

After 1762 the militia carried out their 28 days' annual training. On 2 January 1765 Viscount Beauchamp was commissioned as colonel of the Warwickshire Militia in succession to the Earl of Denbigh.

=== American War of Independence ===
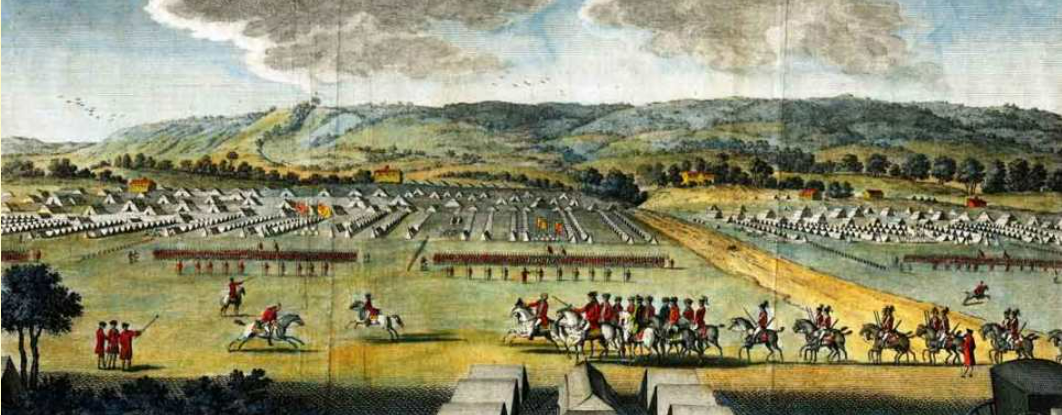
Coxheath Camp in 1778.

There was parliamentary opposition to any embodiment of the militia after the outbreak of the War of American Independence, which was seen as a distant rebellion, although the officers of the Warwickshires volunteered their services. However the militia was called out in 1778 when Britain was threatened with invasion by the Americans' allies, France and Spain. The Warwickshires were embodied at Warwick under Viscount Beauchamp with Lt-Col Skipwith as second-in-command. At their first inspection they were reported to be 'a remarkably good body of men, silent and steady under arms', but that their weapons, accoutrements and Regimental colours all dating from 1767, were mostly bad. They received new arms and colours in August.

By now Warwickshire towns such as Birmingham and Coventry were becoming heavily industrialised and the enlarged population represented a good source of recruits. By 1780 it was estimated that nine-tenths of the Warwickshire Militia was recruited from those two towns, rather than the rural population as before. In the summer of 1778 the regiment was in camp at Fornham, near Bury St Edmunds in Suffolk. In February 1779 the it formed a regimental band and advertised for musicians. For part of that summer the regiment was at Coxheath Camp near Maidstone in Kent. This was the army's largest training camp, where the Militia were exercised as part of a division alongside Regular troops while providing a reserve in case of French invasion of South East England. The following summer the Warwickshires were in camp at Tiptree Heath in Essex, with two regular and six other militia regiments. There was trouble in the camp, with a fight between the Cumberland and Radnor regiments. The camp commander, Lt-Gen Parker, blamed the officers for the lack of discipline. When the Warwickshires joined the camp Parker commented that the men performed well in the field, and that their shortcomings were confined to or caused by the officers. In the summer of 1781 the regiment camped at Warley, and in 1782 it was at Coxheath again.

Under the Militia Act 1778 Parliament sanctioned the augmentation of the militia by additional companies raised by voluntary recruitment. By 1781 the Warwickshires added three such companies, with a total of 939 officers and other ranks (ORs) in 13 companies.

Hostilities ended with the Treaty of Paris in 1783 and the militia regiments were stood down. From 1784 to 1792 they were supposed to assemble for 28 days' annual training, even though to save money only two-thirds of the men were actually called out each year. In 1786 the number of permanent non-commissioned officers (NCOs) was reduced.

=== French Revolutionary War ===
The militia were already being called out when Revolutionary France declared war on Britain on 1 February 1793. By now the industrial West Midlands was such a good recruiting area that it was claimed that Warwickshire provided half the militiamen in each of the adjoining counties. Viscount Beauchamp was still colonel; he soon became the Earl of Yarmouth, and in 1794 he succeeded his father as Marquess of Hertford. Lieutenant-Col Charles Packwood was second-in-command. By 8 August 1793 the Warwickshire regiment, with 10 companies, was stationed at Liverpool.

The French Revolutionary Wars saw a new phase for the English militia: they were embodied for a whole generation, and became regiments of full-time professional soldiers increasingly recruited through voluntary enlistment. Restricted to service in the British Isles, they served in coast defences, manned garrisons, guarded prisoners of war, and carried out internal security duties, while their traditional local defence duties were taken over by the Volunteers and mounted Yeomanry. The militia were seen as a prime source of trained recruits for the regular army.

In 1794 the regiment moved to Sussex, and then in 1795 to the Eastern Counties. On 17 February 1797 the militia were directed to be formed into brigades for their summer training. The Warwickshires, together with the Cambridgeshires, East Norfolks and West Suffolks, formed 2nd Brigade of Gen Sir William Howe's Division. Following the naval Mutiny at the Nore in May–June 1797, the regiment was rushed to Gravesend, where it provided a detachment of 94 officers and men to act as temporary marines on board HMS Standard (marines provided the on-board security detail on warships). The regiment was commended for its alacrity

=== Supplementary Militia ===
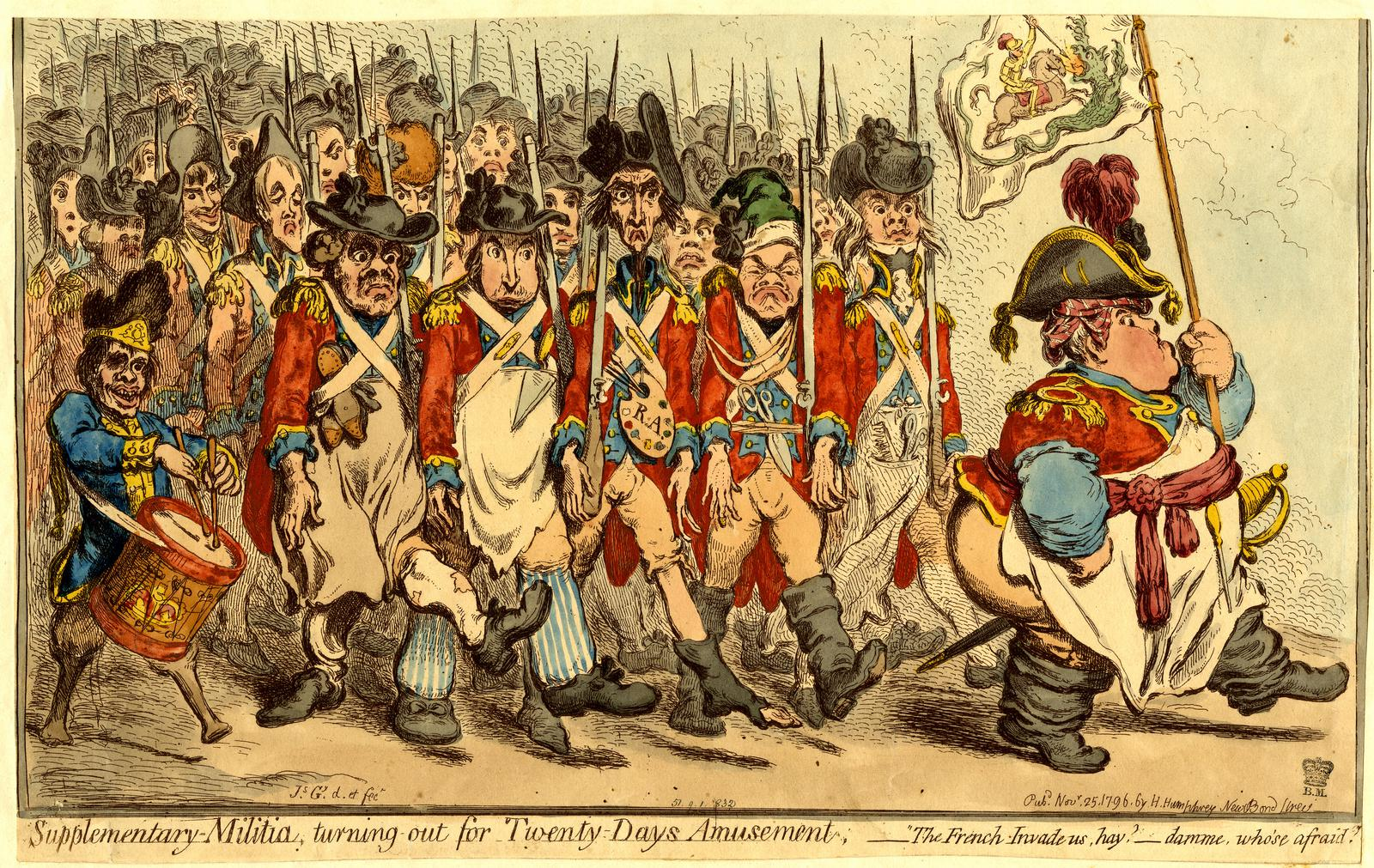
Supplementary-Militia, turning-out for Twenty Days Amusement: 1796 caricature by James Gillray.

In order to have as many men as possible under arms for home defence to release regulars, the Government created the Supplementary Militia in 1796, a compulsory levy of men to be trained in their spare time, and to be incorporated in the Regular Militia in emergency. Warwickshire's additional quota was fixed at 900 men. The lieutenancies were required to carry out 20 days' initial training of these men as soon as possible. The extension of compulsory service was unpopular and there were anti-ballot riots in some parts of the country; even in Warwickshire there was some unrest in December 1796.

=== Irish Rebellion ===
In the summer of 1798 the Irish Rebellion became more serious, with the French sending help to the rebels. The Warwickshire was among the militia regiments that volunteered to serve in Ireland and once the necessary legislation was passed it was one of 13 regiments whose offer was accepted. The Buckinghamshire and Warwickshire regiments were the first to cross the Irish Sea in June, the Warwicks serving under their colonel, Viscount Beauchamp, now the Marquess of Hertford. The regiment was present at the Battle of Ballinamuck when overwhelming forces under the commander-in-chief, Marquess Cornwallis, compelled the surrender of Gen Humbert's Franco-Irish army on 8 September. The remaining rebel parties were suppressed over the following months. At the end of the year the militia regiments were asked if they would extend their service in Ireland, but with the crisis over they were not enthusiastic to do so. The first regiments to arrive, the Buckinghamshires and Warwickshires, were the most eager to go home. The colonel of the Buckinghamshires, the Marquess of Buckingham, blamed the Marquess of Hertford for this situation: 'Lord Hertford has allowed the Warwick to run riot and they tainted ours'. Buckingham persuaded his regiment to stay on until April 1799, and Hertford's brother eventually brought the Warwicks into line.

The regiments returned to England and resumed their routine duties, the Warwickshires in the Eastern Counties. Hostilities ended with the Treaty of Amiens in 1802 and the militia were disembodied.

=== Napoleonic Wars ===
However, the Peace of Amiens was short-lived and Britain declared war on France once more on 18 May 1803. The Warwickshire Militia was embodied on the higher quota of 1796 as two regiments, the 2nd Warwickshires being composed of the supplementaries, now called out for permanent service. The Marquess of Hertford resigned the command and Lord Brooke, son and heir of the lord lieutenant, the Earl of Warwick, was appointed colonel of the 1st Warwickshire Militia on 19 September 1803, and Grey Skipwith (later Sir T Grey Skipwith, 8th Baronet) as Lt-Col Commandant of the 2nd Regiment on 16 July. Lieutenant-Col Packwood also retired and was replaced first by Lt-Col Edward Carver, then Samuel Edward Steward. The Earl of Yarmouth, son and heir of the previous colonel, the Marquess of Hertford, was one of the captains of the 1st Warwicks.

The 2nd Warwicks mustered at Warwick, 464 strong, on 1 September 1803 and the following month marched to Hull, where they formed part of the militia brigade garrisoning the port alongside regular artillery As well as their anti-invasion duties, the militia stationed at Hull were employed to prevent smuggling by the local people. The 1st Warwicks were first stationed in Kent, and then joined the 2nd at Hull in August 1805. The 2nd were disbanded in the autumn and incorporated into the 1st Warwicks. On 1 September the regiment under Lt-Col Steward had 926 men in 10 companies at Hull Barracks as part of the brigade under Maj-Gen Alexander McKenzie. After Hull, the Warwicks served at Sunderland, and then in Kent and Sussex 1809–11.

=== Local Militia ===
While the Regular Militia were the mainstay of national defence during the Revolutionary and Napoleonic Wars, they were supplemented from June 1808 by the Local Militia, which were part-time and only to be used within their own districts. These were raised to counter the declining numbers of Volunteers, and if their ranks could not be filled voluntarily the Militia Ballot was employed. They would be trained once a year. The Earl of Warwick as lord lieutenant was instructed to raise five regiments of local militia in Warwickshire:

- 1st Warwickshire Local Militia: mainly transferred from the 1st Warwickshire Volunteers recruited from Warwick, Leamington and Coventry, under their former commander Col the Hon Charles Finch
- 2nd Warwickshire Local Militia: mainly transferred from the 1st and 2nd Birmingham Loyal Volunteers
- 3rd Warwickshire Local Militia
- 4th Warwickshire Local Militia
- 5th Warwickshire Local Militia: mainly transferred from the 3rd Birmingham Loyal Volunteers

The Local Militia were disbanded on 20 April 1816 after the end of the war.

=== Ireland again ===
The Interchange Act 1811 passed in July allowed English militia regiments to serve in Ireland and vice versa, for a period of up to two years. It appears that the government was happy to send the Warwickshires (and other Midland militia regiments) away to Ireland in case they developed sympathies with the Luddites, who had begun their machine-breaking in Nottingham in 1811.

The regiment marched to Portsmouth in August 1811 and embarked for Cork. At the end of its two years the regiment returned to England and disembarked on 10 July 1813 at Bristol. It remained there, under the command of Lt-Col Dickenson, until the summer of 1814, when it was disembodied after the abdication of Napoleon. It was briefly re-embodied the following year after his escape from Elba and the short Waterloo campaign.

=== Long peace ===
After the Battle of Waterloo there was another long peace. Although officers continued to be commissioned into the militia and ballots were still held until 1829, the regiments were rarely assembled for training and the permanent staffs of sergeants and drummers were progressively reduced. Lord Brooke, who had been appointed colonel in 1803 and had succeeded as Earl of Warwick in 1816, remained in command throughout this period.

== 1852 reforms ==
The Militia of the United Kingdom was revived by the Militia Act 1852 (15 & 16 Vict. c. 50), enacted during a period of international tension. As before, units were raised and administered on a county basis, and filled by voluntary enlistment. Training was for 56 days on enlistment, then for 21–28 days per year, during which the men received full army pay. Under the Act, Militia units could be embodied by Royal Proclamation for full-time home defence service in three circumstances:

1. 'Whenever a state of war exists between Her Majesty and any foreign power'.
2. 'In all cases of invasion or upon imminent danger thereof'.
3. 'In all cases of rebellion or insurrection'.

The Warwickshire Militia was resuscitated as two regiments, the 1st at Warwick and the 2nd formed in March 1853 at Leamington.

The rank of colonel was abolished in the reformed militia, and regiments were commanded by lieutenant-colonels, but could have an Honorary Colonel. Joseph Boultbee, first appointed in 1847, continued as Lt-Col Commandant of the 1st Warwicks, and Sir Thomas Skipwith, 9th Baronet, formerly of the 2nd Dragoon Guards was appointed to command the new 2nd Warwicks. His senior captain was Sir Thomas Biddulph, 7th Baronet, who had been appointed to that rank in the old regiment in 1847. The majority of the majors and captains appointed to the regiments had previous army or naval experience.

The Crimean War having broken out and a large expeditionary force sent overseas, the militia were called out for home defence: both Warwick regiments were embodied in December 1854. Initially both regiments trained at their headquarters, then during June 1855 the 2nd Warwicks were sent to Aldershot Camp. By mid-December the 2nd Warwicks had gone to Armagh in Ireland, moving to Newry a month later. By mid-February 1856 the 1st Warwicks were in Plymouth, while the 2nd had returned to Armagh. They remained at these stations for the remainder of their embodiment. Both regiments were disembodied in June 1856 following the Treaty of Paris.

There was a partial mobilisation of the militia when large forces were sent to suppress the Indian Mutiny in 1857. The 2nd Warwicks were embodied on 14 October and went to Aldershot, moving to Plymouth in December 1858 and to Newport in September 1859. It was disembodied on 30 April 1860.

When the Volunteer Force was reformed in 1859–60, the 1st Warwickshire Militia lent 100 old Brown Bess muskets to the newly-formed Birmingham Rifles for training until modern Enfield rifles could be provided.

Over the following years the regiments mustered each year for 21 or 27 days' training. Militia battalions now had a large cadre of permanent staff (about 30) and around a third of the recruits and many young officers went on to join the Regular Army. The Militia Reserve introduced in 1867 consisted of present and former militiamen who undertook to serve overseas in case of war. Some of these were called out in 1878 during the Balkan Crisis.

== Cardwell and Childers reforms ==
Under the 'Localisation of the Forces' scheme introduced by the Cardwell Reforms of 1872, militia regiments were brigaded with their local Regular and Volunteer battalions. Sub-District No 26 (County of Warwickshire) comprised:

- 1st and 2nd Battalions, 6th (Royal 1st Warwickshire) Regiment of Foot
- 1st Warwick Militia at Warwick
- 2nd Warwick Militia at Militia Barracks, Leamington
- 1st Administrative Battalion, Warwickshire Rifle Volunteer Corps at Coventry
- 1st Warwickshire (Birmingham) Rifle Volunteer Corps at Birmingham

The Sub-District established its depot at Warwick, building Budbrooke Barracks outside the town in 1877, when the 2nd Warwicks moved from Leamington. Following the Cardwell Reforms a mobilisation scheme began to appear in the Army List from December 1875. This assigned Regular and Militia units to places in an order of battle of corps, divisions and brigades for the 'Active Army', even though these formations were entirely theoretical, with no staff or services assigned. The 1st and 2nd Warwick Militia were both assigned to 2nd Brigade of 3rd Division, IV Corps, whose war station was at Limerick in Ireland.

On 1 December 1875, the 1st Warwicks had an enrolled strength of 975 out of an establishment of 1207 all ranks. The 2nd Warwicks were 1006 strong out of an establishment of 1190. Both regiments had use of a 900 yards (820 m) rifle range in the deer park at Stoneleigh Abbey, the country seat of the lord lieutenant (and Honorary Colonel of the 1st Warwicks), Lord Leigh. Among the captains in 2nd Warwicks was Sir Peyton d'Estoteville Skipwith, 10th Baronet, son of the previous commanding officer.

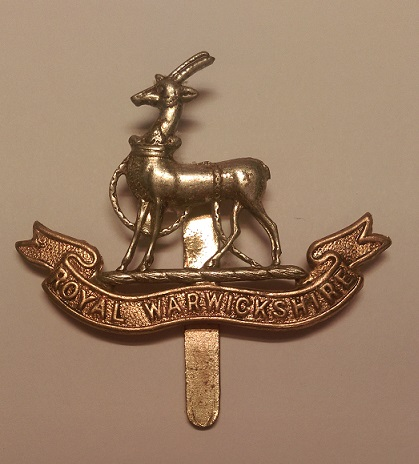
Royal Warwickshire Regiment cap badge, incorporating the antelope emblem.

=== 3rd & 4th Battalions, Royal Warwickshire Regiment ===
The Childers Reforms of 1881 completed the Cardwell process by converting the Regular regiments into two-battalion county regiments, each with two militia battalions. The 6th Foot became the Royal Warwickshire Regiment and the two militia battalions became the 3rd (1st Warwick Militia) and 4th (2nd Warwick Militia) battalions on 1 July 1881.

When the Royal Warwickshires were expanded to four Regular battalions in April 1898, the 3rd and 4th Bns became the 5th (1st Warwick Militia) and 6th (2nd Warwick Militia) Bns (not to be confused with the 5th and 6th Bns of the Territorial Force from 1908, formerly Volunteer Bns of the regiment.)

=== Second Boer War ===
During the Second Boer War, when the bulk of the Regular Army and Militia Reserve was sent to South Africa, the 6th Bn was embodied on 14 December 1899. It then volunteered for overseas service and embarked for South Africa with a strength of 29 officers and 682 ORs. under the command of Lt-Col Harry McCalmont. McCalmont had served in the Royal Warwicks and the Scots Guards, and after retiring from the Regular Army had become a racehorse owner and MP. He joined the then 4th Bn and had been promoted to the command in November 1898.

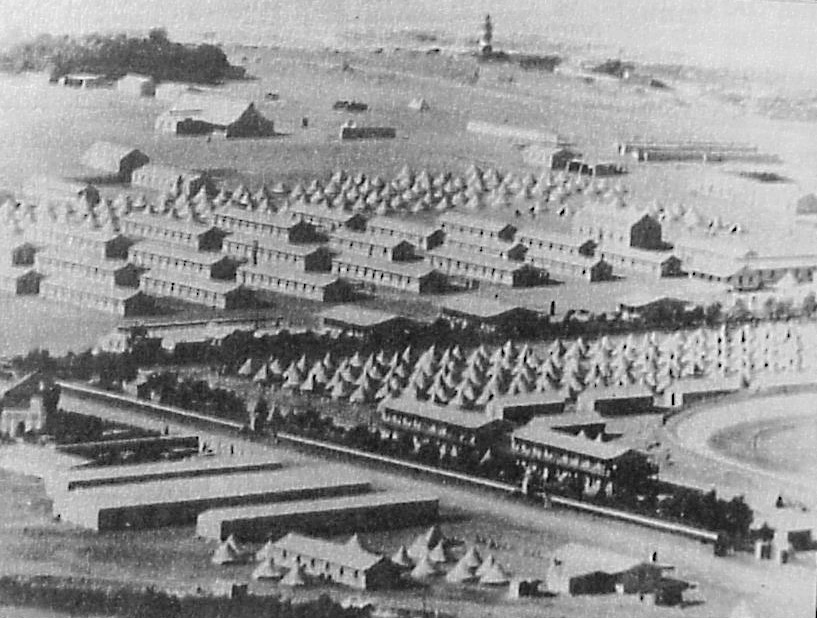
Green Point Camp, used for Boer prisoners of war.

The battalion arrived at Cape Town on 29 January 1900 and was posted to guard Boer prisoners of war at Green Point Camp. In March a 100-strong detachment escorted Gen Piet Cronjé captured at the Battle of Paardeberg and other prisoners when they were shipped to Saint Helena. The battalion also did guard duty at the forts round Simon's Town. On 25 May the battalion moved to Hopetown and on 10 June to Bloemfontein, capital of the Orange Free State, which had been captured after Paardeberg. The battalion was employed on outpost duties round the town, guarding a semi-circle from Bloemspruit, past Sussex Hill, over the railway near St Andrews Hill on to St George's Hill, with battalion headquarters at Warwick Hill. These outposts were in frequent contact with the Boers, who often approached to snipe them at night, and patrols beyond the outposts sometimes contacted enemy parties. The battalion also organised a mounted infantry (MI) company. On 27 February 1901 the 6th Warwicks took part in a skirmish about 4 miles (6.4 km) out from the town when a force cleared some Boer-held kopjes. The kopjes were shelled and mounted infantry worked round the flanks, then the infantry charged, causing the Boers to run.

After 10 months at Bloemfontein the 6th Bn was moved on 30 March 1901 to Sanna's Post, about 25 miles (40 km) to the east. Here there were various outposts and five redoubts built to guard the waterworks supplying Bloemfontein. The Warwicks also had to provide convoy escorts on the roads, and the MI company was used for scouting and patrolling. On 10 April this company was rounding up some loose horses when a party of Boers appeared. The MI took up a position, but the Boers worked round to threaten the retreat so they retired to a better position and the Boers withdrew. Patrols often exchanged long range shots with Boers. On 17 April, after being fired on, a patrol cleared a farm, finding equipment previously lost in action by V Battery Royal Horse Artillery. Between 24 and 27 April the patrols reported many Boers in the area and the MI going out forced a body of about 100 to retire, leaving their camp. The battalion was then concentrated at Bloemfontein and sailed home from Cape Town on 6 May 1901. It was disembodied on 3 June, having lost 26 ORs killed or died of disease, winning two Distinguished Service Orders (DSO). and two Distinguished Conduct Medals (DCM) during the campaign; Col McCalmont was also awarded a Companionship of the Bath (CB). The participants received the Queen's South Africa Medal with clasps for 'Cape Colony', 'Orange Free State' and 'South Africa 1901'.

The 5th Bn was embodied on 23 January 1900 and served at home until 18 October that year, when it was disembodied. However, with the war in South Africa dragging on, it was re-embodied on 2 December 1901, and having volunteered for overseas service it embarked on 16 December with a strength of 23 officers and 743 ORs. It was commanded by Lt-Col Barklie McCalmont, former adjutant of the 1st Bn Royal Warwicks, who had retired from the Regular Army in September 1894 and then been appointed major of the then 3rd Bn. He had been promoted to the command in November 1899.

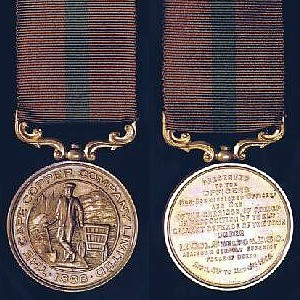
The medal awarded to the defenders of Okiep by the Cape Copper Company.

The 5th Bn served in various detachments around Cape Colony, with its headquarters at Worcester. On 10 February 1902 it moved to Beaufort West and took over the blockhouse line from there to Victoria Road. In March 1902 a detachment of 5th Bn formed part of a column under Lt-Col Shelton of 3rd (2nd Royal Surrey Militia) Bn, Queen's Regiment, which was operating in Namaqualand, where Boers were seizing the copper mines. On 1 April Shelton was in command at the largest mine, at Okiep, when it was attacked by a large force under Jan Smuts. As well as his militiamen of the 3rd Queen's and 5th Royal Warwickshires, Shelton's 900-strong defence force included a large number of miners, both white and Coloured. A determined attack was driven off on 12 April and rifle fire went on all day, after which the Boers closely invested the town. On 1 May they unsuccessfully drove a train loaded with dynamite into the defences. Smuts had been called away to take part in the peace talks at Vereeniging but his men continued the siege until a relief force arrived from Port Nolloth on 3 May. While the siege of Okiep continued, the rest of 5th Royal Warwicks had been moved on 14 April to the blockhouse line at Carnarvon, which was attacked on 19 May, the Boers being driven off. The Treaty of Vereeniging brought the war to an end on 31 May.

The battalion embarked for home at Cape Town on 10 September, and was disembodied on 29 September 1902. During the campaign it lost 2 officers and 8 ORs killed or died of disease. The participants received the Queen's South Africa Medal with clasps for 'Cape Colony' and 'South Africa 1902; Col McCalmont was also awarded a CB. The Cape Copper Company awarded its own Medal for the Defence of O'okiep to all the defenders of the mine, regardless of race or service. The officers and men of the 5th Royal Warwicks who were present during the siege would have received this medal, even though it was unofficial and not allowed to be worn in uniform. The inscription on the medal read: 'PRESENTED TO THE OFFICERS NON-COMMISSIONED OFFICERS AND MEN OF THE GARRISON OF OOKIEP IN RECOGNITION OF THEIR GALLANT DEFENCE OF THE TOWN UNDER LT. COL. SHELTON. D.S.O. AGAINST A GREATLY SUPERIOR FORCE OF BOERS APRIL 4TH TO MAY 4TH 1902'.

For their services the 6th Bn received the Battle honour 'South Africa 1900–01' and the 5th received 'South Africa 1902'.

== Special Reserve ==
After the Boer War, the future of the Militia was called into question. There were moves to reform the Auxiliary Forces (Militia, Yeomanry and Volunteers) to take their place in the six Army Corps proposed by the Secretary of State for War, St John Brodrick. However, little of Brodrick's scheme was carried out.

Under the more sweeping Haldane Reforms of 1908, the Militia was replaced by the Special Reserve (SR), a semi-professional force whose role was to provide reinforcement drafts for Regular units serving overseas in wartime, rather like the earlier Militia Reserve. The additional Regular battalions were disbanded, so the 5th (1st Warwick Militia) became the 3rd (Reserve) Battalion on 28 June and the 6th (2nd Warwick Militia) became the 4th (Extra Reserve) Battalion of the regiment on 9 August.

=== World War I ===
The SR was embodied on the outbreak of World War I on 4 August 1914 and the two Warwickshire battalions mustered at Warwick. Both went to their war station at Portsmouth, and were then stationed on the Isle of Wight. 3rd (R) Battalion was at Parkhurst, 4th (ER) Bn at Golden Hill Fort, later at Sandown. They carried out their twin roles of coast defence and training reinforcements for the Regular battalions serving overseas. By November 1917 they had become part of the Dover Garrison. 4th (ER) Battalion was disembodied on 13 November 1918, 3rd (R) Bn on 15 July 1919, when the remaining personnel were drafted to the Regular 1st Bn.

=== 12th (Reserve) Battalion ===
After Lord Kitchener issued his call for volunteers in August 1914, the battalions of the 1st, 2nd and 3rd New Armies ('K1', 'K2' and 'K3' of 'Kitchener's Army') were quickly formed at the regimental depots. The SR battalions also swelled with new recruits and were soon well above their establishment strength. On 8 October 1914 each SR battalion was ordered to use the surplus to form a service battalion of the 4th New Army ('K4'). Accordingly, the 3rd (Reserve) Bn formed the 12th (Service) Bn of the Warwickshires at Parkhurst on 4 December. It was assigned to 96th Brigade of 32nd Division, transferred to 97th Bde of that division on 12 December, and began training for active service. By January 1915 the battalion was at Newport. On 10 April 1915 the War Office decided to convert the K4 battalions into 2nd Reserve units, providing drafts for the K1–K3 battalions in the same way that the SR was doing for the Regular battalions. The battalion became 12th (Reserve) Bn and moved to 8th Reserve Brigade (formerly 96th Bde) in Dorset, with 12th Warwickshires at Wool. The battalion was disbanded at Bovington Camp on 30 August 1916 and the men distributed among the other battalions of 8th Reserve Bde preparatory to the 2nd Reserve battalions being reorganised into the Training Reserve (TR) on 1 September.

=== 13th (Reserve) Battalion ===
Similarly, 4th (ER) Bn formed 13th (Service) Bn at Golden Hill Fort on 25 December 1914. The War Office had cancelled the original order for most Extra Reserve battalions on 25 October, but the Royal Warwicks went ahead and formed 13th (S) Bn anyway. By February 1915 the battalion was at Totland Bay, also in 97th Bde. It was also converted into a 2nd Reserve battalion in 8th Reserve Bde on 10 April as 13th (R) Bn, and by May it was at Blandford Camp.

When the TR was formed in September 1916 the battalion became 33rd Training Reserve Bn in 8th Reserve Bde, though the training staff retained their Royal Warwicks badges. It was redesignated as 206th (Infantry) Bn, TR, on 13 July 1917 and transferred to 192nd Bde in 64th (2nd Highland) Division on 16 July. This second-line Territorial Force (TF) division was stationed in Norfolk, where it carried out coastal defence and training duties. 206th TR Battalion was stationed at North Walsham, where on 24 October 1917 it was transferred to the Devonshire Regiment as 51st (Graduated) Bn. 64th Division's original TF battalions were progressively replaced by Graduated training battalions during 1917–18. 51st (G) Bn Devons went to Norwich for the winter and then to Holt by May 1918, where it remained for the rest of the war.

After the Armistice with Germany 64th Division began to demobilise. However, the Allied occupation forces in the Rhineland required to be kept up to strength, and many Graduated battalions were converted to service battalions and sent to reinforce the British Army of the Rhine. 51st (G) Battalion Devons became 51st (Service) Bn on 8 February 1919, and in May it joined 87th Bde of Southern Division on the Rhine. It left in October 1919 and returned to the UK, being finally disbanded at Ripon on 31 March 1920.

=== Postwar ===
The SR resumed its old title of Militia in 1921 but like most militia units the 3rd and 4th Warwicks remained in abeyance after World War I. By the outbreak of World War II neither battalion had any remaining officers listed. The Militia was formally disbanded in April 1953.

== Commanders ==
=== Colonels ===
The following served as Colonel of the Regiment:

- Sir Charles Shuckburgh, 2nd Baronet, in 1697
- Basil Feilding, 6th Earl of Denbigh, from 28 March 1759
- Francis Ingram-Seymour-Conway, 2nd Marquess of Hertford, January 1765
- Henry Greville, 3rd Earl of Warwick, 19 September 1803

Following the 1852 reforms the militia rank of colonel was abolished and in the future the lieutenant-colonel would become the commanding officer (CO); at the same time, the position of Honorary Colonel was introduced.

=== Lieutenant-colonels ===
Lieutenant-Colonels of the regiment (commanding officers after 1862) included the following:

- Hon George Shirley, 1759
- Charles Packwood, 1793–1803
- Edward Carver, 1803–04
- Sir T. Grey Skipwith, 8th Baronet (commandant, 2nd Bn) 1803–05
- Samuel Steward, 25 April 1804
- Dickenson (ca 1813–14)
- Joseph Boultbee, 29 May 1847

1st Warwick Militia, later 3rd (R) Bn

- Joseph Boultbee, 29 May 1847
- Brevet Col Charles Wise, formerly 11th Foot, 2 June 1860
- Oswald Grimston, formerly 19th Foot, promoted 15 April 1874
- H.H. Roberts, promoted 8 December 1888
- W.A. Pennington, promoted 17 October 1894
- Barklie McCalmont, formerly Royal Warwicks, promoted 15 November 1899
- Robert Blake, from Reserve of Officers, appointed 10 July 1907
- F.A. Earl, from Retired Pay
- James Clyne, promoted 3 June 1911, transferred to 2/7th Bn Royal Warwicks 6 December 1916
- John Hacket, promoted 6 December 1916

2nd Warwick Militia, later 4th (ER) Bn

- Sir Thomas Skipwith, 9th Baronet, formerly 2nd Dragoon Guards, 2 April 1853
- Frederick Granville, formerly 23rd Foot, promoted 18 February 1858
- George Perkins, promoted 2 March 1878
- M.W. Furness, promoted 27 June 1888
- J. Gilden, promoted 22 October 1890
- Harry McCalmont, CB, MP, formerly Scots Guards, promoted 8 March 1898, died 8 December 1902
- Edward Dawes, from Retired Pay, 19 September 1903
- Alfred Williams, promoted 25 February 1911, transferred 11 October 1916
- Archibald Maunsell, promoted 11 October 1916, invalided 24 July 1918
- Arthur Fitzgerald, from 10th (S) Bn Royal Warwicks 12 September 1918

12th (R) Bn

- Brevet Col Gerald Armstrong, DSO, retired, formerly Royal Warwicks, appointed 9 November 1914

13th (R) Bn

- Col James Grove White, appointed 2 December 1914

=== Honorary colonels ===
The following served as Honorary Colonel of the regiments:

1st Warwick Militia

- William Henry Leigh, 2nd Baron Leigh, appointed 2 June 1865, died 1905
- Francis Leigh, 3rd Baron Leigh, appointed 16 September 1907

2nd Warwick Militia

- Frederick Granville, former CO, appointed 30 January 1878
- George Perkins, former CO, appointed 6 October 1888

== Heritage & ceremonial ==
=== Uniforms & insignia ===
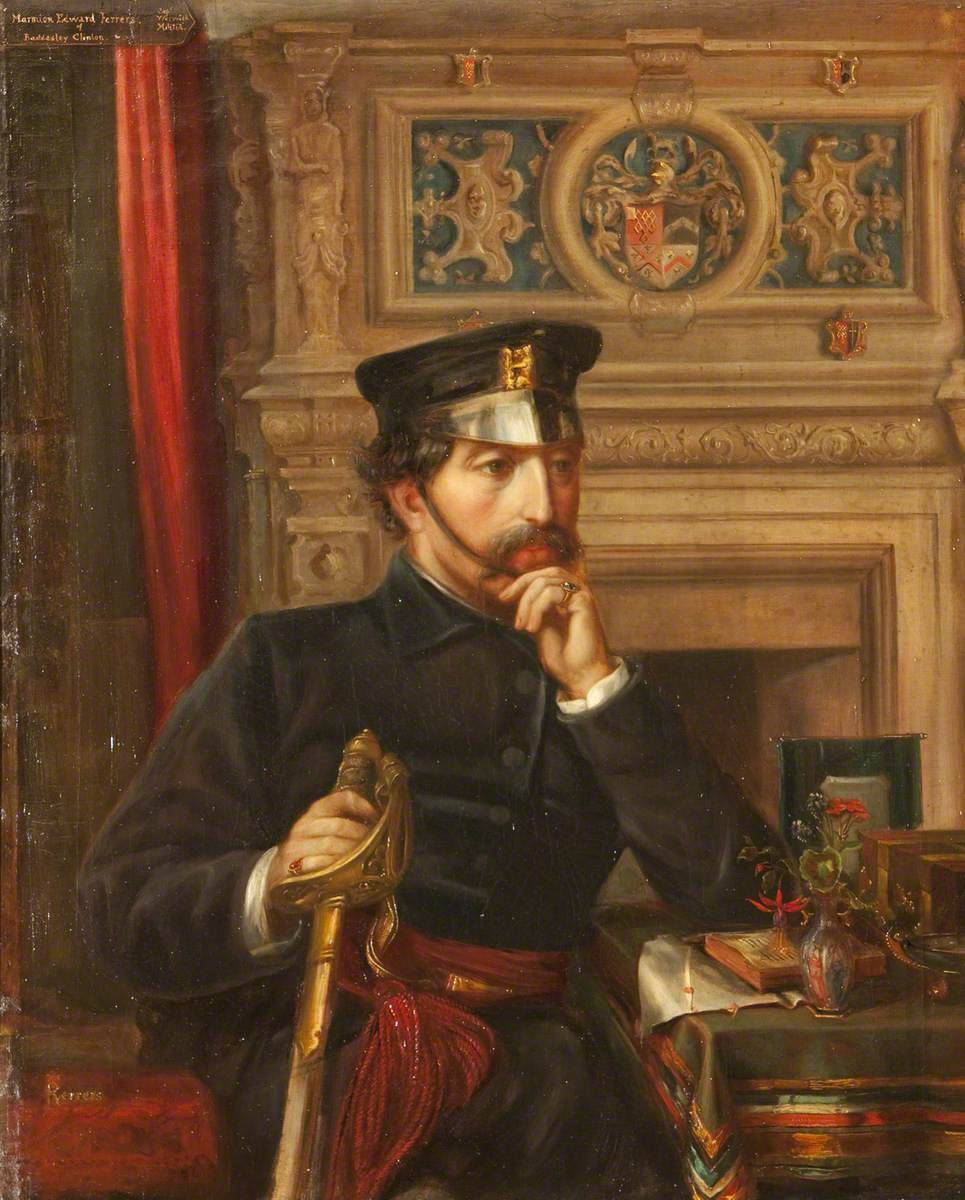
Captain Marmion Edward Ferrers of Baddesley Clinton, Warwickshire Militia, painted by his wife, Rebecca Dulcibella Orpen. He is wearing an officer's blue frock coat and crimson sash, with the bear and ragged staff badge prominent on his cap. (National Trust)

In 1762 and 1778 the regiment wore red coats with mid-green facings, with silver laced buttonholes for the officers. By 1800 this had changed to a red uniform with yellow facings, the officers wearing silver epaulettes but no buttonholes. The 2nd Regiment formed in 1853 adopted white facings. Both regiments changed to the Royal Warwickshires' blue facings in 1881.

The 1st Warwick Militia wore the Bear and Ragged Staff badge of Warwickshire on their headgear and waistbelt plates. The 2nd Warwicks shako plate and officers' waistbelt plate had the crowned Royal cypher. Then from 1874 to 1881 the 2nd Warwicks' cap badge had a crowned lion's face within a heart-shaped border inscribed 'Second Warwick' and the motto Souveigne vous de moy ('Remember me'), the whole surmounted by a bunch of ivy. The 2nd wore the antelope as a collar badge. In 1881 the whole regiment adopted the bear and ragged staff cap badge, but reverted to the traditional antelope badge of the 6th Foot in December 1894, retaining the bear and ragged staff as a collar badge for some time.

In 1810 the officers wore a shoulder-belt plate with the letters 'W.M.' in ornate script. After 1833 the coatee button had '36' surmounted by a crown and with 'Warwick' underneath. About 1840 the officers' coatee skirt ornament was a Garter star with the garter inscribed 'Warwick Militia'. From 1855 to 1881 the tunic buttons of the 1st Warwicks had the Royal Cypher below a crown and the title of the regiment round the top.

=== Precedence ===
In September 1759 it was ordered that militia regiments on service were to take precedence from the date of their arrival in camp. In 1760 this was altered to a system of drawing lots where regiments did duty together. During the War of American Independence the counties were given an order of precedence determined by ballot each year. For the Warwickshire Militia the positions were:

- 35th on 1 June 1778
- 3rd on 12 May 1779
- 18th on 6 May 1780
- 5th on 28 April 1781
- 40th on 7 May 1782

The militia order of precedence balloted for in 1793 (Warwickshire was 31st) remained in force throughout the French Revolutionary War. Another ballot for precedence took place in 1803 at the start of the Napoleonic War, when Warwickshire was 40th. This order continued until 1833. In that year the King drew the lots for individual regiments and the resulting list remained in force with minor amendments until the end of the militia. The regiments raised before the peace of 1763 took the first 47 places; Warwickshire was placed at 36th, and the 1st Warwicks retained this position when the list was revised in 1855. The newly raised 2nd Warwicks became 53rd, though it is not clear why it was given precedence over many older regiments. Most militia regiments ignored the numeral, but the Warwickshires did briefly include '36' in their insignia.

== See also ==
- Trained Bands
- Militia (English)
- Militia (Great Britain)
- Militia (United Kingdom)
- Special Reserve
- Royal Warwickshire Regiment
