= Baron Leigh =

Extinct barony in the Peerage of England

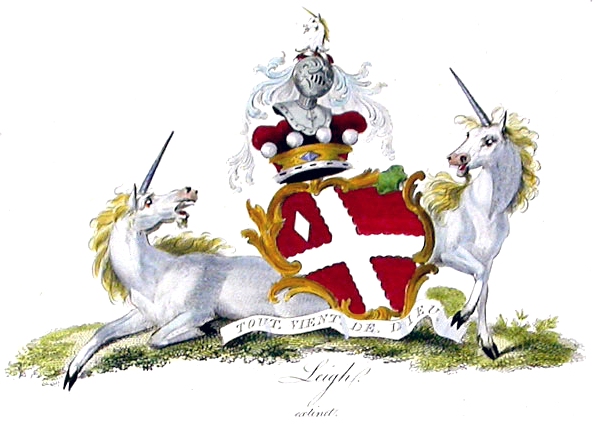
The coat of arms of the Barons Leigh (of the first creation).

Baron Leigh has been created twice as a hereditary title, once in the Peerage of England and once in the Peerage of the United Kingdom. The writer Jane Austen is associated with this dynasty.

The first creation came in the Peerage of England 1643 when Sir Thomas Leigh, 2nd Baronet, was created Baron Leigh, of Stoneleigh in the County of Warwick.

The Leigh Baronetcy, of Stoneleigh in the County of Warwick, had been created in 1611 for his grandfather and namesake Thomas Leigh Sr. The latter was the second son of Sir Thomas Leigh (d. 1571) and his wife Alice née Barker, an heiress of Sir Rowland Hill. Thomas Lee Sr. was Lord Mayor of London in 1558) and his third son Sir William Leigh was the grandfather of Francis Leigh, 1st Earl of Chichester.

The titles became extinct on the death of the fifth Baron Leigh in 1786.

The barony was revived in 1839 when the poet Chandos Leigh was created Baron Leigh, of Stoneleigh in the County of Warwick, in the Peerage of the United Kingdom. He was a descendant of Rowland Leigh, eldest son of the aforementioned Sir Thomas Leigh (d. 1571), himself of a cadet branch of the ancient Leighs of West Hall, High Legh. Both Lord Leigh's son, the second Baron, and grandson, the third Baron, served as Lord Lieutenant of Warwickshire. The third Baron was succeeded by his nephew, the fourth Baron. As of 2024 the title is held by the latter's grandson, the sixth Baron, who succeeded his father in 2003.

Sir Edward Chandos Leigh, second son of the first Baron, was a cricketer and barrister. James Wentworth Leigh, third son of the first Baron, was Dean of Hereford. Gilbert Leigh, eldest son and heir of the second Baron, who sat as Member of Parliament for Warwickshire South predeceased his father. Theophilus Leigh, who belonged to a junior branch of the family, married Mary Brydges, sister of The 1st Duke of Chandos, and was the father of Thomas Leigh (died 1764): Thomas, in turn, was the father of Cassandra Leigh, mother of Jane Austen.

The family seat was Stoneleigh Abbey, near Kenilworth, Warwickshire. In 1960, a serious fire broke out at Stoneleigh Abbey and caused considerable damage to the fabric of the house. Some time thereafter the 4th Baron Leigh (1908–1979) transferred the ownership of Stoneleigh Abbey to a charitable trust, but members of the Leigh family continued to reside at Stoneleigh Abbey until 1990. The current family seat of the Barons Leigh is the Adlestrop Park Estate, near Moreton-in-Marsh, in the Gloucestershire Cotswolds. This estate was transferred by the 4th Baron Leigh to his eldest son and heir, the subsequent 5th Baron Leigh (1935–2003) in 1960, and remains in the ownership of the present 6th Baron Leigh (b.1960) and his family.

Alice Leigh (1579–1669), later Alice Dudley, Duchess of Dudley, wife of Sir Robert Dudley, was a daughter of the 1st baronet.

== Leigh Baronets, of Stoneleigh (1611) ==
- Sir Thomas Leigh, 1st Baronet (d. 1626)
- Sir Thomas Leigh, 2nd Baronet (1595–1672) (created Baron Leigh in 1643)

== Barons Leigh, First creation (1643) ==
- Thomas Leigh, 1st Baron Leigh (1595–1672)
- Thomas Leigh, 2nd Baron Leigh (1652–1710)
- Edward Leigh, 3rd Baron Leigh (1684–1738)
- Thomas Leigh, 4th Baron Leigh (1713–1749)
- Edward Leigh, 5th Baron Leigh (1742–1786)

== Barons Leigh, Second creation (1839) ==
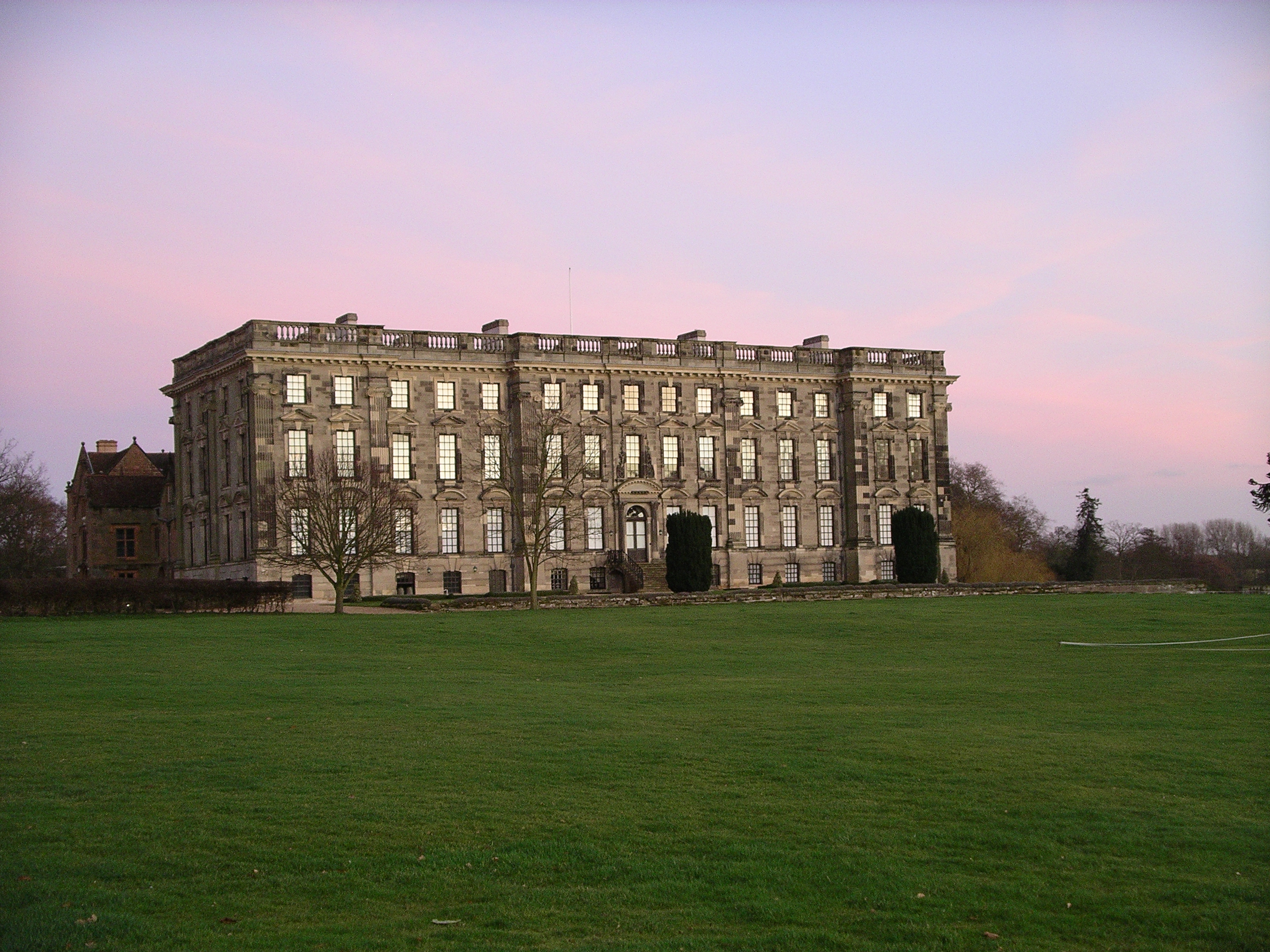
Stoneleigh Abbey, Warwickshire

- Chandos Leigh, 1st Baron Leigh (1791–1850)
- William Henry Leigh, 2nd Baron Leigh (1824–1905)
  - Gilbert Henry Chandos Leigh (1851–1884)
- Francis Dudley Leigh, 3rd Baron Leigh (1855–1938)
- Rupert William Dudley Leigh, 4th Baron Leigh (1908–1979)
- John Piers Leigh, 5th Baron Leigh (1935–2003)
- Christopher Dudley Piers Leigh, 6th Baron Leigh (b. 1960)

The heir apparent is the present holder's son Rupert Dudley Leigh (b. 1994).

== See also ==
- Earl of Chichester (1644 creation)
- Howard Leigh, Baron Leigh of Hurley (LP 2013)

Preceded by Constable baronets	Leigh baronets of Stoneleigh; 29 June 1611	Succeeded by Noel baronets
