= Stoneleigh Cricket Club =

Stoneleigh Cricket Club is one of the oldest cricket clubs in Warwickshire, England. It was voted by Wisden Cricketer the most beautiful ground in England in 2003.

The club was formed in 1839 (186 years ago) by Chandos Leigh, 1st Baron Leigh and the ground was established in front of the West Wing of Stoneleigh Abbey for the benefit of his sons William Henry Leigh and Edward Chandos Leigh so that they might continue to play cricket in the summer on returning home from Harrow School.

One of the oldest fixtures recorded is a match played between Stoneleigh CC v Harrow School in 1847 at Harrow. A match was played against Rugby School in 1849 at Rugby School. This match is still annually played between Stoneleigh CC and Rugby School

Sons of William Henry Leigh, 2nd Baron Leigh continue to play cricket through the 1860s and 1870s. Fixture Cards dated 1868 and 1869 have been found.

One of the most famous matches was played in September 1872 at Stoneleigh Abbey between the I Zingari and The Gentleman of Warwickshire to celebrate the coming of age of Lord Leigh's eldest son Gilbert Leigh.

Today the club is a thriving club with a Junior Team now established.
