= Francis Leigh, 3rd Baron Leigh =

British peer (1855–1938)

Colonel Francis Dudley Leigh, 3rd Baron Leigh KStJ TD (30 July 1855 – 16 May 1938) was a British peer and Warwickshire landowner. He was Lord of the Manor of Hunningham. An officer in the Warwickshire Yeomanry and honorary colonel of several volunteer and Territorial formations associated with the county, he served as an ambulance driver in the First World War. In 1921, he became Lord Lieutenant of Warwickshire, and held the post until his death in 1938. He had no children by either of his two marriages, so his peerage passed to a nephew.

He was the second son of William Henry Leigh, 2nd Baron Leigh and his wife Caroline. He was educated at Harrow School and then at Trinity College, Cambridge, which awarded him a BA in 1879 and a MA in 1882. Francis became his father's heir apparent when his elder brother Gilbert died in a hunting accident in Montana in 1884.

On 18 January 1885, he was appointed a deputy lieutenant of Warwickshire by his father, who was then Lord Lieutenant of Warwickshire. His father also commissioned him as a lieutenant in the Warwickshire Yeomanry on 7 November 1885. He was promoted to captain in the Yeomanry on 24 March 1888. On 16 January 1901, he was given the honorary rank of major in the Yeomanry. That rank was made substantive on 18 September. On 13 June 1903, he was appointed honorary colonel of the 2nd Volunteer Battalion of the Royal Warwickshire Regiment, part of the Volunteer Force.

In addition to his association with the Yeomanry and Volunteer Force in Warwickshire, from 1886 to 1891, Leigh was assistant secretary to the Secretary of State for India, Viscount Cross. He was elected to London County Council in 1904 for St George's Hanover Square, which he represented until 1907.

Leigh succeeded his father as Baron Leigh at the latter's death in 1905, and inherited the family home of Stoneleigh Abbey. His association with the Warwickshire volunteer and militia units continued. He was appointed honorary lieutenant-colonel in the Warwickshire Yeomanry on 7 February 1906, and on 16 December 1907, was appointed Honorary Colonel of the 5th (1st Warwickshire Militia) Battalion, Royal Warwickshire Regiment (becoming the 3rd (Reserve) Battalion in the Special Reserve after the Haldane Reforms). He resigned his Yeomanry commission on 11 January 1908. On 1 April 1908, he became Honorary Colonel of the 7th Battalion, Royal Warwickshire Regiment, the Territorial Force unit which replaced the 2nd Volunteer Battalion.

Leigh continued to serve as honorary colonel of the two Royal Warwickshire battalions during the First World War, and was also honorary colonel and commandant of the Warwickshire Volunteer Regiment from 21 November 1917, up until 16 October 1919. While he supported the war effort as a Warwickshire country magnate (where he was appointed Vice Lieutenant on 3 September 1915,), he also bought and equipped a Ford ambulance and drove it on the front lines.

Following the death of the William Craven, 4th Earl of Craven, Leigh became Lord Lieutenant of Warwickshire on 12 August 1921. His services were recognized by several appointments and decorations: he was made a Knight of Grace of the Order of Saint John on 1 June 1922, was awarded the Territorial Decoration on 2 January 1923 for long service, and was made a president of the League of Mercy on 12 January 1923.

He retired from the honorary colonelcy of 7th Battalion on 5 July 1933.

Leigh married twice, both times to Americans. On 29 November 1890, he married Frances Helene Forbes Beckwith (d. 28 April 1909), the daughter of Nelson M. Beckwith, at St George's, Hanover Square. She died of pneumonia at Stoneleigh in 1909. He married Marie Campbell (d. 13 March 1949) on 2 October 1923.

Leigh had no children by either marriage, so when he died on 16 May 1938, he was succeeded by his nephew, Rupert.

Honorary titles
Preceded by The Earl of Craven	Lord Lieutenant of Warwickshire; 1921–1938	Succeeded by Lord Henry Charles Seymour
Peerage of the United Kingdom
Preceded by William Leigh	Baron Leigh; 1905–1938	Succeeded by Rupert Leigh
