= Mary Sackville, Countess of Dorset (1669–1691) =

The Right Honourable The Countess of Dorset
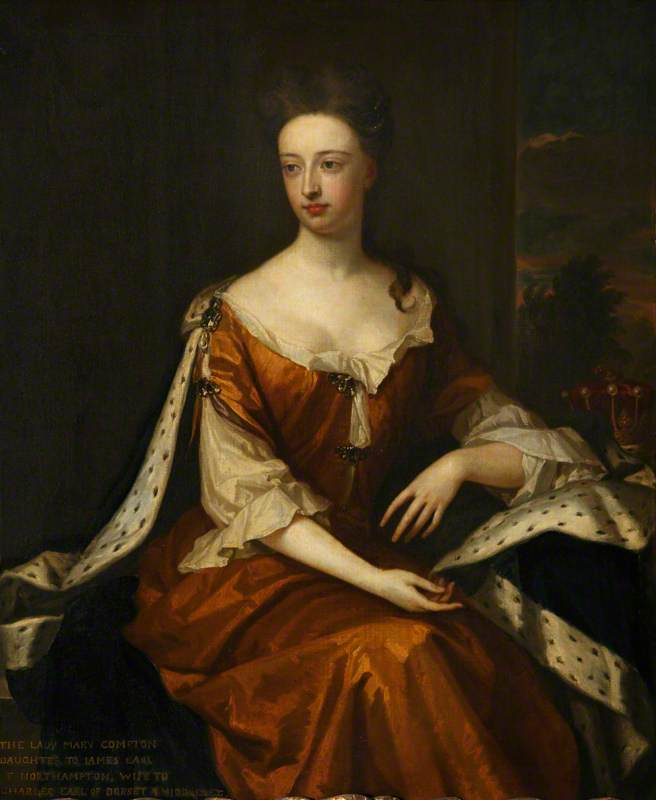
- Portrait by Sir Godfrey Kneller
- Born: Mary Compton; 1669
- Died: August 6, 1691 (aged 21–22)
- Spouse: Charles Sackville, 6th Earl of Dorset
- Issue: Lionel Sackville, 1st Duke of Dorset; Lady Mary Sackville
- Father: James Compton, 3rd Earl of Northampton
- Mother: Mary Noel

Mary Sackville, Countess of Dorset (born Lady Mary Compton; 1669 – 6 August 1691) was a 17th century aristocrat, being a courtier at the royal court of Queen Mary II. She was one of the Hampton Court Beauties, painted by Sir Godfrey Kneller for Queen Mary. She was Lady of the Bedchamber to the Queen.

== Biography ==
Mary Compton’s father was James Compton, 3rd Earl of Northampton, her mother being Mary Noel, daughter of Baptist Noel, 3rd Viscount Campden. In 1685 she married Charles Sackville, 6th Earl of Dorset as his second wife. They lived at Copt Hall, Waltham Abbey, Essex.

=== Death ===
Mary Sackville died of smallpox in London on 6 August 1691, aged 22 years and was buried in the Sackville chapel at Withyham, East Sussex on 15 August 1691.

== Issue ==
Mary and her husband had two children:

1. Lionel Sackville, 1st Duke of Dorset (1688 – 1765); created Duke of Dorset in 1720. Died at age 77.
2. Lady Mary Sackville (1688 – 1705); first wife of Henry Somerset, 2nd Duke of Beaufort. Not much is known whether she had issue.
