= James Compton, 3rd Earl of Northampton =

English playwright and Royalist (1622-1681)

The Right Honourable The Earl of Northampton FRS PC
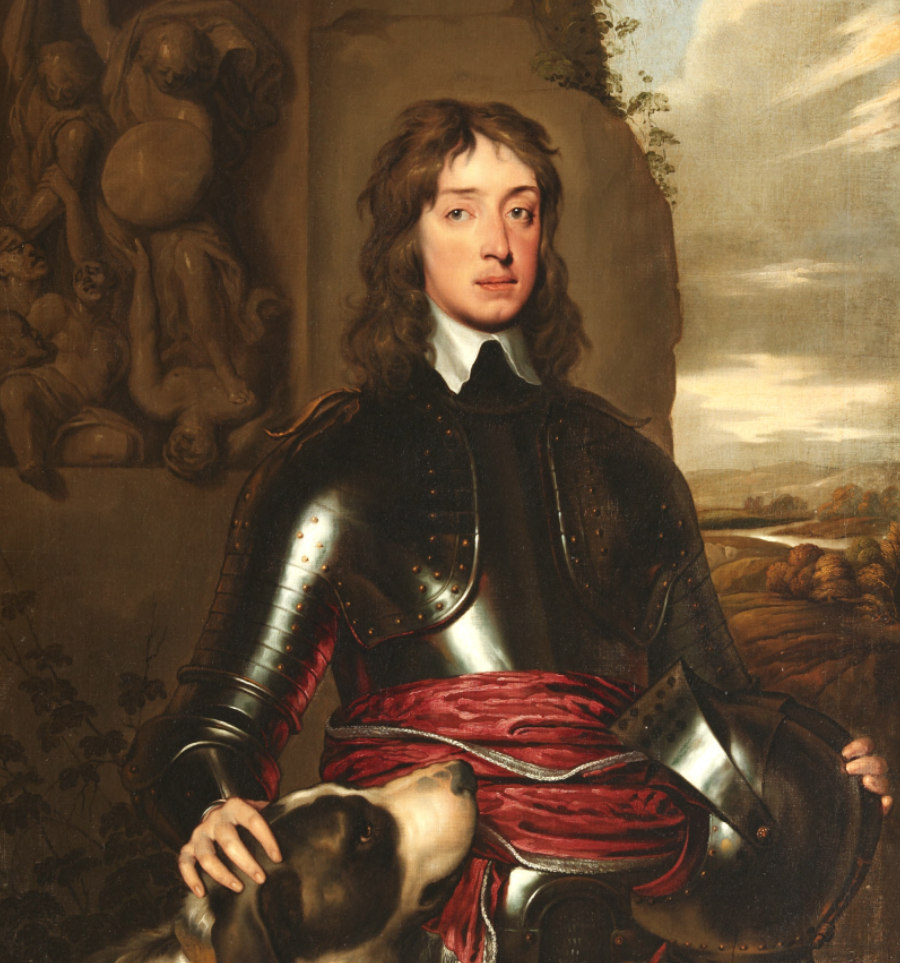
- James Compton, 3rd Earl of Northampton

Lord Lieutenant of Warwickshire
- In office 1660–1681

Constable of the Tower of London
- In office 1675–1679

Privy Councillor
- In office 1673–1679

Member of Parliament for Warwickshire
- In office November 1640 – September 1642 (excluded)

Personal details
- Born: James Compton; 19 August 1622 Compton Wynyates
- Died: 15 December 1681 (aged 59) Castle Ashby House
- Resting place: Compton Wynyates burial grounds
- Party: Royalist
- Spouse(s): (1) Isabella Sackville (1647–1661) (2) Mary Noel (1663–his death)
- Children: Alethea (1661–1678); George (1664–1727); Mary, (1669–1691); Spencer (1674–1743)
- Parent(s): Spencer Compton, 2nd Earl of Northampton; Mary Beaumont
- Education: Queens' College, Cambridge
- Occupation: Playwright, translator, landowner, soldier and Royalist politician

Military service
- Allegiance: Royalist
- Rank: Colonel
- Unit: Earl of Northampton's Regiment of Horse
- Battles/wars: First English Civil War; Edgehill; Hopton Heath; First Newbury; Cropredy Bridge; Islip Bridge; Naseby; Siege of Oxford; Booth's Uprising

James Compton, 3rd Earl of Northampton FRS (19 August 1622 – 15 December 1681), was an English peer, politician and author, who fought for the Royalists during the First English Civil War.

He succeeded his father Spencer Compton, 2nd Earl of Northampton when he was killed in March 1643 at the Battle of Hopton Heath. After the war ended in Royalist defeat in 1646, he spent the next 14 years living quietly on his estates, although he was arrested several times on suspicion of involvement in conspiracies to restore Charles II.

Following The Restoration in 1660, he was rewarded with appointments as Lord Lieutenant of Warwickshire and Constable of the Tower of London. While he attended the House of Lords on a regular basis, he played little role in active politics; his third son Spencer briefly became prime minister from 1742 to 1743. He died in December 1681.

Although known to have written a number of plays and translated others, the full extent of his output was only revealed when a cache of papers was discovered at the family home of Castle Ashby House in 1977. Based on this, it is suggested "his name should be added to the list of 17th century, or more particularly of Cavalier, playwrights".

== Personal details ==
James Compton was born on 19 August 1622, eldest son of Spencer Compton, 2nd Earl of Northampton (1601–1643) and Mary Beaumont (died 1654). Originally from Compton Wynyates in Warwickshire, his father was a close personal friend of Charles I and extremely wealthy, owning properties in more than eleven counties, including Castle Ashby House which became his main seat.

Compton had five brothers and two sisters; Charles (1624–1661), William (1625–1663), Spencer (died 1659), Francis (1629–1716), Henry (1632–1713), Anne (1637–1705) and Penelope (1642–1667). Four of the brothers fought in the First English Civil War, including William who during The Protectorate was a senior member of the Royalist conspiracy group known as the Sealed Knot. His youngest brother Henry became Bishop of London and a leading member of the Anglican opposition to James II of England, deposed in November 1688.

He was twice married, first in 1647 to Isabella (1622–1661), daughter of Richard Sackville, 3rd Earl of Dorset; of their six children, only one survived to adulthood, his daughter Alethea (1661–1678). His second marriage to Mary Noel (died 1719) produced three sons and two daughters, including his heir George (1664–1727), Mary Sackville, Countess of Dorset (1669–1691) and Spencer Compton, 1st Earl of Wilmington, who was briefly Prime Minister from 1742 to 1743.

== Career ==
Compton was educated at Eton College, before attending Queens' College, Cambridge; in 1638, he accompanied his father to The Hague in the retinue of Charles' nephew, the Elector Palatine. He spent the next two years travelling in Europe, before returning home to stand for election as MP for Warwickshire in November 1640. He was one of 53 MPs to vote against the Attainder of Charles' chief minister, the Earl of Strafford, who was executed in May 1641.

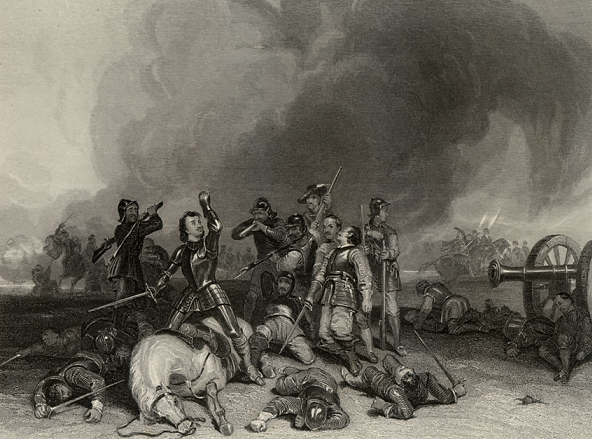
Battle of Hopton Heath, March 1643; the Royalist cavalry capture the Parliamentarian artillery

When the First English Civil War began in 1642, his father was appointed Commissioner of Array for Warwickshire, Northamptonshire and Gloucestershire; Compton was slightly wounded in one of the first actions of the war, an attack on Warwick Castle. He and his three younger brothers served at Edgehill in October 1642, before capturing Banbury Castle in November, which they used as a base for operations.

In March 1643, a Royalist cavalry force including Compton and led by his father the Earl of Northampton clashed with a Parliamentarian army under Sir John Gell at Hopton Heath. One Royalist charge over-ran the Parliamentarian artillery, in the course of which the Earl was unhorsed, then killed after refusing to surrender; Gell offered to hand over his body if Compton returned the captured artillery, a suggestion he refused.

His father's death meant Compton inherited his titles and regiments; he fought at the First Battle of Newbury in September 1643, then Cropredy Bridge in June 1644, before being routed by Oliver Cromwell at Islip, Oxfordshire in April 1645. He was present at Naseby in June, a defeat that destroyed the last major Royalist field army, and accompanied Charles on the attempt to link up with Montrose in Scotland that ended at Rowton Heath in September. He returned to Oxford and surrendered to the Committee of Both Kingdoms in February 1646, shortly before the war ended in June.

After paying a fine, he resumed ownership of his estates in 1651 and most of his literary output dates from this period, which includes several plays and poems, as well as translations of French and Italian works. He also supported a number of minor poets and playwrights, the most significant being Cosmo Manuche, a former Royalist officer. While his brother William was involved in the Royalist underground as a member of the Sealed Knot, Compton remained largely undisturbed by the authorities, although he was briefly arrested for his part in the 1659 Booth's Uprising.

Following The Restoration in 1660, Compton was rewarded by Charles II with appointments as Lord Lieutenant of Warwickshire and Recorder of Coventry, which he held until his death. As lord-lieutenant he personally commanded a Troop of the Warwickshire Militia Horse, and used the militia to destroy the fortifications of Coventry, which had been the most republican town in the county during the war. He attended the House of Lords on a regular basis, his most significant act being to propose the banishment of Clarendon, former advisor to Charles I and Lord Chancellor from 1660 to 1667. The diarist Samuel Pepys described this as a "thing of vanity and insult...which is mighty poor I think, and so doth everyone else". He was made a Privy Councillor in 1673, then Constable of the Tower of London in 1675, before being removed from both posts during the 1679 Exclusion Crisis.

After his death on 15 December 1681, he was buried in the family vault at Compton Wynyates, next to his first wife and succeeded as fourth Earl of Northampton by his son George.

== Literary works ==
A founding member of the Royal Society in 1660, Compton is best known as a patron of the arts. In 1977, the discovery of manuscripts held in the family archives at Castle Ashby showed he wrote at least four original plays, including one on Caracalla, and an unfinished draft of a drama on Strafford. He also translated Niccolò Machiavelli's comedy "La Mandragola" and one of the earliest English versions of the French tragedian Pierre Corneille.

== Sources ==
- Bennett, Martyn (2004). "Compton, Spencer, second earl of Northampton". Oxford Dictionary of National Biography (online ed.). Oxford University Press. doi:10.1093/ref:odnb/6035. (Subscription, Wikipedia Library access or UK public library membership required.)
- Burke, John; Burke, Bernard (1848). Burke's Genealogical and Heraldic History of the Peerage, Baronetage and Knightage; Volume 10. Henry Colburn.
- Colby, H.W (2004). "Compton, Henry (1632–1713)". Oxford Dictionary of National Biography (online ed.). Oxford University Press. doi:10.1093/ref:odnb/6032. (Subscription, Wikipedia Library access or UK public library membership required.)
- Foard, G; Partida, T (2005). "Battle of Hopton Heath 19th March 1643". Battlefields Trust.
- Anne Hughes, Politics, Society and Civil War in Warwickshire, Cambridge: Cambridge University Press, 1987, ISBN 0-521-33252-4.
- Kelliher, H.W (2004). "Compton, James, third earl of Northampton (1622–1681)". Oxford Dictionary of National Biography (online ed.). Oxford University Press. doi:10.1093/ref:odnb/46937. (Subscription, Wikipedia Library access or UK public library membership required.)
- Kelliher, Hilton (1980). "A hitherto unrecognised Cavalier dramatist; James Compton, 3rd Earl of Northampton". British Library Journal. 6 (2). JSTOR 42554121.
- Lobel, Mary D, ed. (1959). A History of the County of Oxford, Volume 6: Ploughley Hundred. Victoria County History. Oxford University Press for the Institute of Historical Research.
- Pepys, Samuel (1983). Latham, R; Mathews, W (eds.). Diary of Samuel Pepys, Volume VIII. Bell & Hyman. ISBN 978-0713515510.
- Williams, P.W (2004). "Manuche, Cosmo (bap. 1613, d. 1673?)". Oxford Dictionary of National Biography (online ed.). Oxford University Press. doi:10.1093/ref:odnb/18010. (Subscription, Wikipedia Library access or UK public library membership required.)

Honorary titles
Vacant English Interregnum	Lord Lieutenant of Warwickshire; 1660–1681	Succeeded by The Earl of Conway
Preceded by Sir John Robinson, Bt	Constable of the Tower of London; Lord Lieutenant of the Tower Hamlets; 1675–1679	Succeeded by The Lord Alington
Peerage of England
Preceded by Spencer Compton	Earl of Northampton; 5th creation 1643–1681	Succeeded by George Compton
