= Custos Rotulorum of Warwickshire =

This is a list of people who have served as Custos Rotulorum of Warwickshire.

- Sir George Throckmorton bef. 1544–1552
- Sir Ambrose Cave bef. 1558–1568
- Robert Dudley, 1st Earl of Leicester bef. 1573–1588
- Sir Fulke Greville bef. 1594 – aft. 1596
- Sir Thomas Leigh bef. 1605–1626
- Fulke Greville, 1st Baron Brooke 1626–1628
- William Feilding, 1st Earl of Denbigh 1628–1643
- Francis Leigh, 1st Baron Dunsmore 1643–1646
- Interregnum
- Basil Feilding, 2nd Earl of Denbigh 1660–1675
- Edward Conway, 1st Earl of Conway 1675–1683
- Robert Spencer, 2nd Earl of Sunderland 1683–1689
- George Compton, 4th Earl of Northampton 1689–1719
- Thomas Parker, 1st Earl of Macclesfield 1719–1728
- John Montagu, 2nd Duke of Montagu 1728–1749

For later custodes rotulorum, see Lord Lieutenant of Warwickshire.
