= Cosmo Manuche =

Cosmo Manuche (bap. 1613, d. 1673?), English playwright of an Italian heritage, baptized on 24 October 1613 at The Church of St Andrew, Holborn, in the City of London. He is best-known for two plays written in 1652: The Just General: a Tragi:Comedy and The Loyal Lovers: a Tragi Comedy, as well as his connection to his patron James Compton, 3rd Earl of Northampton.

== Early life ==
Manuche was christened on 24 October 1613 at St Andrew's, Holborn, in the liberties of the City of London, as the oldest surviving son of the painter James Manuche (c.1590–1633) and Katherine, who resided near the Windmill in Shoe Lane, Holborn. His grandfather, Jacomo Manuche (d. 1593), originally came to England about 1573 and spent many years in Sir Francis Walsingham's intelligence-gathering network in England and overseas. Queen Elizabeth I awarded his grandfather a £40 pension for life in 1577.

Cosmo Manuche enrolled at Merchant Taylors' School in London in 1626, a few years after John Webster, the future dramatist, whose family lived near the Manuches in Shoe Lane. He would have presumably dropped out of school around 1631 or 1632. There is no evidence that Cosmo Manuche enrolled at a university. It is possible that he could not attend due to family obligations. His father, James Manuche, died on 7 March 1633, and was buried at St Andrew's, Holborn. Cosmo Manuche was still living in the family house in the early 1630s.

== Marriage and children ==
He married Anne Cooley (d. 1641) on 19 January 1636 at St Dunstan and All Saints, Stepney. There is no record of any of the couple's children being christened at St Andrew's, Holborn. They continued to reside there, because Anne was buried in this same parish on 11 April 1641. Manuche married his second wife, Frances Brewster, on 27 October 1648, in the church of St Bartholomew-the-Less, London. Manuche mentions daughters in the dedication (to James Compton, 3rd Earl of Northampton) of his play The Feast (c.1664).

== Death and afterwards ==
On 7 November 1673, a Major Mullinax was buried in Westminster Abbey's Dark Cloister, and it seems probable that he was Cosmo Manuche, as Manuche's wife Frances Manuche was also buried in the cloisters on 11 January 1676.

Even though his plays were never acted, according to Nicholas Watson they “contain a significance beyond their literary or dramatic worth. For Manuche belongs with some scores of other minor dramatists who were the real harbingers of the Restoration Drama, continuing as they did with the decadent elements in Ben Jonson, John Fletcher, Thomas Middleton, Philip Massinger, John Webster and thus forming a rather closely connected bridge between the later Jacobean dramatists and William Wycherley, John Vanbrugh, William Congreve”.

== Recognition ==
Manuche used the designation ‘Major,’ signalling armed involvement in the royalist cause, along with his patron, James Compton, the third Earl of Northampton, who also composed some dramatic works.

== Published works ==
- The Just General: a Tragi:Comedy
- The Loyal Lovers: a Tragi Comedy (1652)
- The Bastard, published anonymously (1652)
  Bishop Percy found, around 1770, nine manuscript plays other than those already named in the Marquis of Northampton's library at Castle Ashby:
- The Banished Shepherdess
- The Feast: a comedy
- The Mandrake (a comedy in prose), is unfinished
- Agamemnon: a tragedy, is unfinished
- Leontius, King of Ciprus
- The Captives
- Mariamne
- Two untitled works
