= Chandos Leigh, 1st Baron Leigh =

British landowner and minor poet (1791–1850)

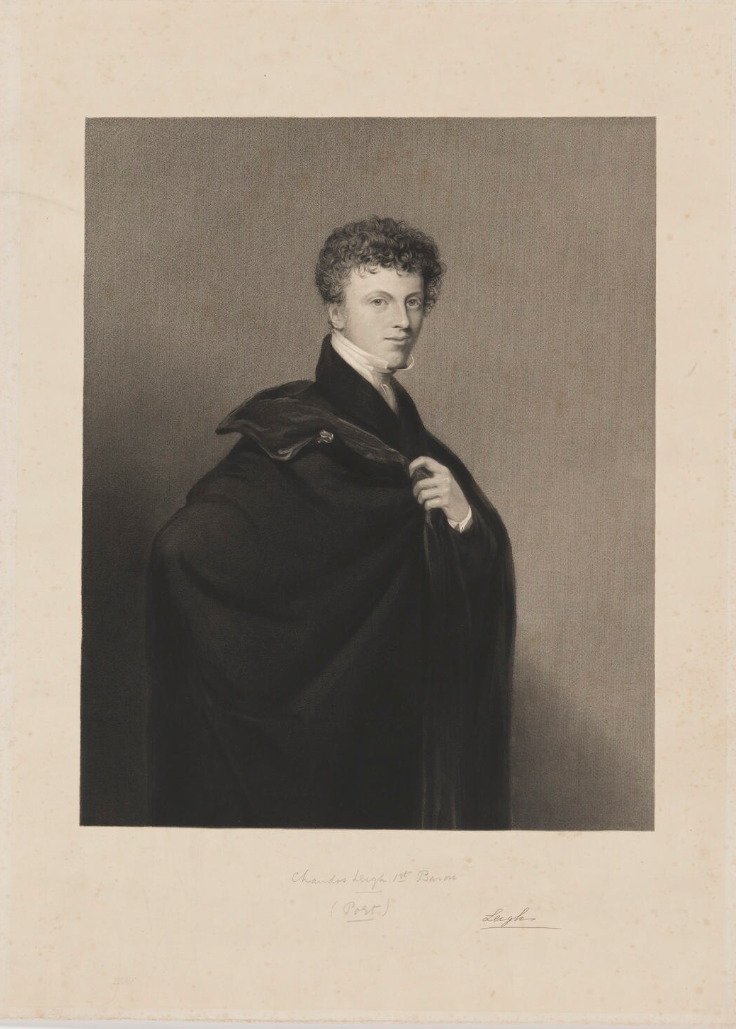
Stipple engraving, artist unknown.

Chandos Leigh, 1st Baron Leigh (27 June 1791 – 27 September 1850) was a British landowner and minor poet. He was Lord of the Manor of Hunningham.

== Early life ==
Leigh was the son of James Henry Leigh, of Adlestrop, Gloucestershire, the son of James Leigh by Lady Caroline Brydges, daughter of Henry Brydges, 2nd Duke of Chandos. He was a descendant of Sir Thomas Leigh, Lord Mayor of London in 1558. His mother was the Hon. Julia Judith Twisleton, daughter of Thomas Twisleton, 13th Baron Saye and Sele. He was educated at Harrow and Christ Church, Oxford.

Leigh's father had inherited the Leigh family seat at Stoneleigh Abbey, Stoneleigh, Warwickshire, following the death of his distant cousin Edward Leigh, 5th and last Baron Leigh.

== Life ==
Leigh was Lord Byron's schoolmate at Harrow and is said to have "inherited some of his master's poetical talent". He gained a reputation as an author and minor poet. He dined with Byron the evening before Byron left England for Europe in April 1816. He was also a close friend and confidant of Leigh Hunt. He was also a cousin of Jane Austen, who visited Stoneleigh Abbey in 1806. There is good evidence that it was the model for the chapel of Sotherton Court in Mansfield Park (1814).

Leigh was appointed High Sheriff of Warwickshire in 1825. In 1839 the barony of Leigh was revived in his favour when he was made Baron Leigh, of Stoneleigh in the County of Warwick. In 1839, he also formed Stoneleigh Cricket Club in the Stoneleigh grounds at the request of his son Edward Chandos Leigh, who wanted to continue to play cricket on returning home from Harrow School in the summer months.

== Personal life ==
Lord Leigh married Margarette Willes, daughter of Reverend William Shippen Willes, of Astrop House, Northamptonshire, in 1819. They had at least three sons and seven daughters, including:

- Hon. Julia Anne Eliza Leigh (1820–1887), who in 1842 married Charles Adderley, the later 1st Baron Norton.
- William Leigh, 2nd Baron Leigh (1824–1905), who married Lady Caroline Amelia Grosvenor, a daughter of Richard Grosvenor, 2nd Marquess of Westminster.
- Hon. Augusta Leigh (1825–1893), never married. Died Scarborough.
- Hon. Mary Leigh (1826–1906), who married Reverend Hon. Henry Pitt Cholmondeley.
- Hon. Sir Edward Chandos Leigh (1832–1915), who was a cricketer and barrister.
- Hon. James Wentworth Leigh (1838–1923), Dean of Hereford.

Lord Leigh died in September 1850, aged 59, and was succeeded in the barony by his eldest son, William. Lady Leigh died in February 1860.

Honorary titles
Preceded by Robert Middleton Atty	High Sheriff of Warwickshire; 1825–1826	Succeeded by Lionel Place
Peerage of the United Kingdom
New creation	Baron Leigh; 1839–1850	Succeeded by William Henry Leigh
