= William Henry Leigh, 2nd Baron Leigh =

British politician (1824–1905)

- Born: 17 January 1824
- Died: 21 October 1905 (aged 81)
- Occupation: politician
- Spouse: Lady Caroline Amelia Grosvenor (m. 1848)
- Children: 3 sons, 4 daughters
- Parents: Chandos Leigh, 1st Baron Leigh (father); Margarette Willes (mother)

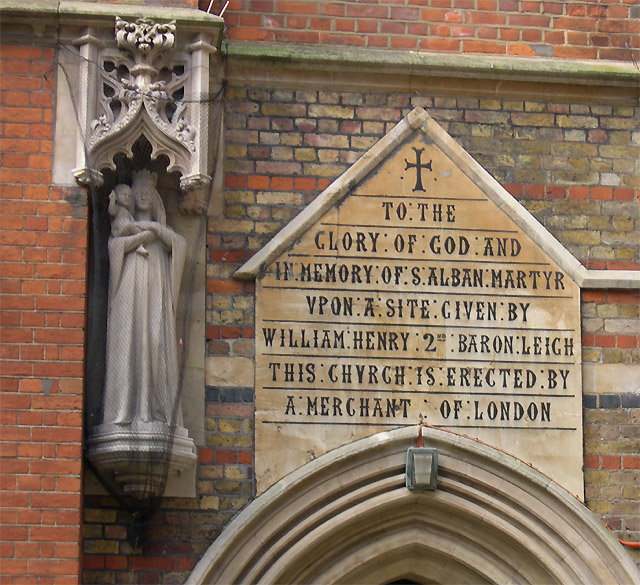
Inscription to him at St Alban's Church

William Henry Leigh, 2nd Baron Leigh, PC, JP (17 January 1824 – 21 October 1905) was a British politician.

== Life ==
He was the eldest of three sons born to Chandos Leigh, 1st Baron Leigh and his wife Margarette Willes. He was Lord of the Manor of Hunningham. Educated at Harrow School and Trinity College, Cambridge (the university later also awarded him an honorary Doctor of Law degree), he married Lady Caroline Amelia Grosvenor (1828-1906), daughter of Richard Grosvenor, 2nd Marquess of Westminster, on 22 August 1848 and they had seven children:

- Margaret Elizabeth Leigh (1849-1945), married Victor Albert George Child-Villiers, 7th Earl of Jersey
- Gilbert Henry Chandos Leigh (1851-1884)
- Agnes Eleanor Leigh (1853-1942)
- Francis Dudley Leigh (1855-1938)
- Rupert Leigh (1856-1919), army officer
- Rowland Charles Frederick Leigh (1859-1943), barrister
- Mary Cordelia Emily Leigh (1866-1956)

William succeeded his father as Baron Leigh on his death on 27 September 1850. He was Lord Lieutenant of Warwickshire from 1856 until his death and was also made Honorary Colonel of the 1st Warwickshire Militia, later the 3rd Battalion of the Royal Warwickshire Regiment. He was High Steward of Sutton Coldfield from 1859 until 1892, when the stewardship lapsed after a new charter was issued for the borough, but was reappointed in September 1902. He also held office as a Justice of the Peace for Gloucestershire. He donated the land for the construction of St Alban's Church, Holborn in central London. He was a Privy Councillor from 1895 onwards, the same year as he unsuccessfully stood as MP for the constituency of North Warwickshire in the general election that year. William was succeeded by his second son Francis, after his eldest son Gilbert's early death.

Lord Leigh was the first Grand Master of the Grand Lodge of Mark Master Masons, serving from 1856 to 1860. He was for more than 50 years (1852–1905) Provincial Grand Master for the Freemasons of Warwickshire.

== Sources ==
- http://www.npg.org.uk/collections/search/person/mp57817/william-henry-leigh-2nd-baron-leigh
- http://www.the-eastern-window.com/EWcdv45.html

Honorary titles
Preceded by The Earl of Craven	Lord Lieutenant of Warwickshire; 1856–1905	Succeeded by The Marquess of Hertford
Preceded by Heneage Finch	High Steward of Sutton Coldfield; 1859–1905	Succeeded by Sir John Benjamin Stone
Peerage of the United Kingdom
Preceded by Chandos Leigh	Baron Leigh; 1850–1905	Succeeded by Francis Leigh
