= George Compton, 4th Earl of Northampton =

British peer and politician

George Compton, 4th Earl of Northampton, PC (18 October 1664 – 15 April 1727), styled Lord Compton from 1664 to 1681, was a British peer and politician.

Northampton was the son of James Compton, 3rd Earl of Northampton, and his wife Mary (née Noel). Prime Minister Spencer Compton, 1st Earl of Wilmington, was his younger brother. He succeeded his father in the earldom in 1681, aged 17. Lord Northampton later served as Lord Lieutenant of Warwickshire from 1686 to 1687 and again from 1689 to 1727 and was Constable of the Tower of London from 1712 to 1715. At the coronation of William and Mary in 1689, he bore the King's sceptre and cross. In 1702, he was admitted to the Privy Council.

Lord Northampton married Jane Fox, daughter of Sir Stephen Fox and his first wife Elizabeth Whittle and half-sister of Henry Fox, 1st Baron Holland, in 1686. She died on 10 June 1721. He married secondly Elizabeth, Lady Thorold, the widow of Sir George Thorold, 1st Baronet, on 3 July 1726. She died aged 67 on 15 January 1750 and was buried with her parents, Sir James Rushout, 1st Baronet and his wife Alice Pitt, at Blockley, Gloucestershire.

Northampton died on 15 April 1727, aged 62, and was succeeded in his titles by his eldest son James. His other son Charles was also a member of parliament.

== Notes ==
Honorary titles
Preceded by The Earl of Sunderland	Lord Lieutenant of Warwickshire; 1686–1687	Succeeded by The Earl of Sunderland
Preceded by The Earl of Sunderland	Lord Lieutenant of Warwickshire; 1689–1715	Succeeded by The Duke of Montagu
Preceded by The Earl of Sunderland	Custos Rotulorum of Warwickshire; 1689–1719	Succeeded by The Earl of Macclesfield
Preceded by The Earl Rivers	Constable of the Tower of London; 1712–1715	Succeeded by The Earl of Carlisle
Preceded by The Earl Rivers	Lord Lieutenant of the Tower Hamlets; 1712–1715	Succeeded by Hatton Compton
Peerage of England
Preceded by James Compton	Earl of Northampton; 5th creation 1681–1727	Succeeded by James Compton
Preceded by James Compton	Baron Compton (descended by acceleration); 1681–1711	Succeeded by James Compton
