= Edward Chandos Leigh =

British aristocrat and barrister

Sir Edward Chandos Leigh

Cricket information
- Batting: Right-handed

Career statistics
Competition	First-class
Matches	16
Runs scored	215
Batting average	9.77
100s/50s	0/1
Top score	62
Catches/stumpings	8/–
- Source: CricInfo, 30 December 2021

Sir Edward Chandos Leigh KCB KC (22 December 1832 – 18 May 1915) was a British aristocrat of the Victorian era, a barrister by profession, and a first-class cricketer. He served as President of MCC for 1887–88.

== Background ==
Born at Stoneleigh Abbey, Warwickshire, he was the second son of Chandos, 1st Baron Leigh and Margarette Willes, daughter of the Reverend William Shippen Willes, of Astrop House, Northamptonshire.

Leigh attended Harrow School before going up to Oriel College, Oxford, where he was elected a Fellow of All Souls.

== Cricket career ==
Leigh started playing cricket as a boy at Stoneleigh Abbey after his father Lord Leigh, Lord Byron's schoolmate at Harrow, established a cricket ground at his country estate at Stoneleigh Abbey in 1839 for his eldest son William Henry Leigh who was attending Harrow. In 1847 Leigh started at Harrow and was quickly identified by Bob Grimston as a future cricketer to the Harrow XI captain Henry Vernon "There, Vernon, is the young cricketer". Bob Grimston and Frederick Ponsonby were to become his lifelong friends. On 15 June 1847 his home club side Stoneleigh Club including his elder brother William Henry Leigh, Lord Burghley, Lord Guernsey and Robert Grimston played against the Harrow XI. In September 1848 Edward played for the 22 of Leamington & District v the All England XI at Wisden & Parr's Ground, Leamington. In 1849 and 1850 he was selected for the Harrow XI and in 1851 he captained the Harrow XI and scored the highest score of 42 in Harrow's win v Eton at Lords.

At Oxford in 1852 he obtained his Blue as a freshman and played against Cambridge at Lord's in 1852, 1853 and 1854 as captain. Oxford won all three matches although Eddy (as he was known) made only 8 runs in total during these matches. Shrimp Leveson Gower records in his Recollections of Oxford cricket an incident forty years later when he had scored 73 runs in Oxford's first innings. 'On my return to the pavilion my Uncle – Edward Chandos Leigh, who was seated near the entrance gate, greeted me with the words: "Well Done, Schwimp (he could not pronounce his R's) "Capital, capital, you played just like I used to". His nephew replied 'Heaven forbid, Uncle Eddy'.

Leigh was a founder of the Oxford Harlequins Club. He was a Fellow of All Souls until 1871 and played for Oxfordshire County XI and the Gentleman of MCC. He played regularly for I Zingari for 20 years until 1874. He was a right-handed batsman, but fielded with his left. His highest first-class score was 62 playing for the MCC v Kent at Canterbury in 1861.

He served as Secretary of I Zingari for many years and later Chancellor. He regularly captained I Zingari on their tours of Ireland during the 1850s and 1860s. He captained I Zingari on their and the MCC's tour in 1867 to the Paris Exhibition. It was said if I Zingari had "the four Edwards" it was sure to do well; Edward Tredcroft, Edward Balfour, Edward Drake and Edward Chandos Leigh. In his autobiography Bar, Bat and Bit, published in 1913, Leigh records the enjoyment of playing for I Zingari at the Canterbury Festival and touring England and Ireland's country estates. He met his future wife at Croxteth Hall while performing for the Old Stagers as a guest of Lord Sefton with I Zingari.

In 1871 Leigh married Katherine Fanny Rigby having sought permission from John Lorraine Baldwin at I Zingari. In 1872 he played his last game for I Zingari v Gentleman of Warwickshire at Stoneleigh Abbey. He joined the MCC in 1852 and served on its committee 1866–69, 1877–79, 1888–1891. He was elected president in 1887 having been nominated by Lord Lyttleton.

He helped establish the Old Harrovians Field House Club in 1884. He was President of the Club succeeding his close friend, the Earl of Bessborough.

He was President of the Marylebone Cricket Club (MCC) in its first centenary year in 1887 and the Golden Jubilee year of Queen Victoria.

== Professional and public career ==
In 1890 Leigh was a founder member of the London Playing Fields Society, which successfully secured land in London for cricket and football to be played for London's citizens. He was Recorder of Nottingham from 1881 to 1909 and Counsel to the Speaker of the Commons from 1883 to 1907. He was appointed a Commander of the Order of the Bath (CB) in the 1895 Resignation Honours, and a Knight Commander of the Order of the Bath (KCB) in the 1901 New Year Honours.

He was a regular visitor to Lord's, The Canterbury and Scarborough Festivals up until his death in May 1915. His elder son Major Chandos Leigh was the first Harrovian to be killed in the Great War, at Mons in August 1914. He died six days after his youngest son Edward was killed in action at Aubers Ridge.
