= Lord Lieutenant of Warwickshire =

Monarch's representative in English county

This is an incomplete list of people who have served as Lord Lieutenant of Warwickshire. Since 1728, all Lord Lieutenants have also been Custos Rotulorum of Warwickshire.

== Lord Lieutenants of Warwickshire ==
- Ambrose Dudley, 3rd Earl of Warwick 1569–1570
- vacant
- Ambrose Dudley, 3rd Earl of Warwick bef. 1587 – 21 February 1590
- vacant
- William Compton, 1st Earl of Northampton 29 October 1603 – 24 June 1630
- Spencer Compton, 2nd Earl of Northampton 17 July 1630 – 1642
- Robert Greville, 2nd Baron Brooke 1642 (Parliamentarian)
- Basil Feilding, 2nd Earl of Denbigh 1643 (Parliamentarian)
- Interregnum
- James Compton, 3rd Earl of Northampton 18 July 1660 – 15 December 1681
- Edward Conway, 1st Earl of Conway 23 January 1682 – 11 August 1683
- Robert Spencer, 2nd Earl of Sunderland 5 September 1683 – 29 March 1686
- George Compton, 4th Earl of Northampton 29 March 1686 – 5 December 1687
- Robert Spencer, 2nd Earl of Sunderland 5 December 1687 – 20 June 1689
- George Compton, 4th Earl of Northampton 20 June 1689 – 21 July 1715
- John Montagu, 2nd Duke of Montagu 21 July 1715 – 5 July 1749
- Francis Greville, 1st Earl Brooke 3 October 1749 – 29 June 1757
- Francis Seymour-Conway, 1st Marquess of Hertford 29 June 1757 – 14 June 1794
- George Greville, 2nd Earl of Warwick 6 February 1795 – 2 May 1816
- Francis Seymour-Conway, 2nd Marquess of Hertford 19 July 1816 – 28 June 1822
- Henry Greville, 3rd Earl of Warwick 18 July 1822 – 10 August 1853
- William Craven, 2nd Earl of Craven 12 September 1853 – 12 March 1856
- William Leigh, 2nd Baron Leigh 12 March 1856 – 21 October 1905
- Hugh Seymour, 6th Marquess of Hertford 27 November 1905 – 23 March 1912
- William Compton, 5th Marquess of Northampton 7 May 1912 – 15 June 1913
- William Craven, 4th Earl of Craven 18 July 1913 – 10 July 1921
- Francis Leigh, 3rd Baron Leigh 8 August 1921 – 16 May 1938
- Lord Henry Charles Seymour 20 June 1938 – 18 June 1939
- John Verney, 20th Baron Willoughby de Broke 28 August 1939 – 15 January 1968
- Charles Smith-Ryland 15 January 1968 – 1989
- Francis FitzRoy Newdegate, 3rd Viscount Daventry 19 March 1990 – 17 January 1997
- Sir Martin Dunne 17 January 1997 – 30 March 2013
- Timothy Cox 2 April 2013 – present
