= Gilbert Leigh =

British politician

Leigh in 1880

Gilbert Henry Chandos Leigh, DL, JP (1 September 1851 – 15 September 1884) was a British Liberal Party politician.

== Background and education ==
Leigh was the eldest son and heir apparent of William Leigh, 2nd Baron Leigh, and Lady Caroline Amelia Grosvenor, daughter of Richard Grosvenor, 2nd Marquess of Westminster. He was educated at Harrow and Magdalene College, Cambridge.

== Political career ==
Leigh entered Parliament for Warwickshire South in the 1880 general election, a seat he held until his death four years later. He also served as a Deputy Lieutenant and Justice of the Peace for Warwickshire.

== Personal life ==
Leigh died in a hunting accident on a shooting expedition in the Big Horn Mountains Wyoming, United States, in September 1884, aged 33, (his body having to be retrieved from the bottom of a canyon), predeceasing his father by 21 years. He was unmarried and childless. He left an estate of £3,718 7s. 8d. His younger brother Francis later succeeded in the barony.

Parliament of the United Kingdom
Preceded by The Earl of Yarmouth; Sir John Eardley-Wilmot, Bt	Member of Parliament for Warwickshire South; 1880–1884; With: Sir John Eardley-Wilmot, Bt	Succeeded by Sir John Eardley-Wilmot, Bt; Sampson Lloyd
