= Stoneleigh Abbey =

Country house in Stoneleigh, Warwickshire, England

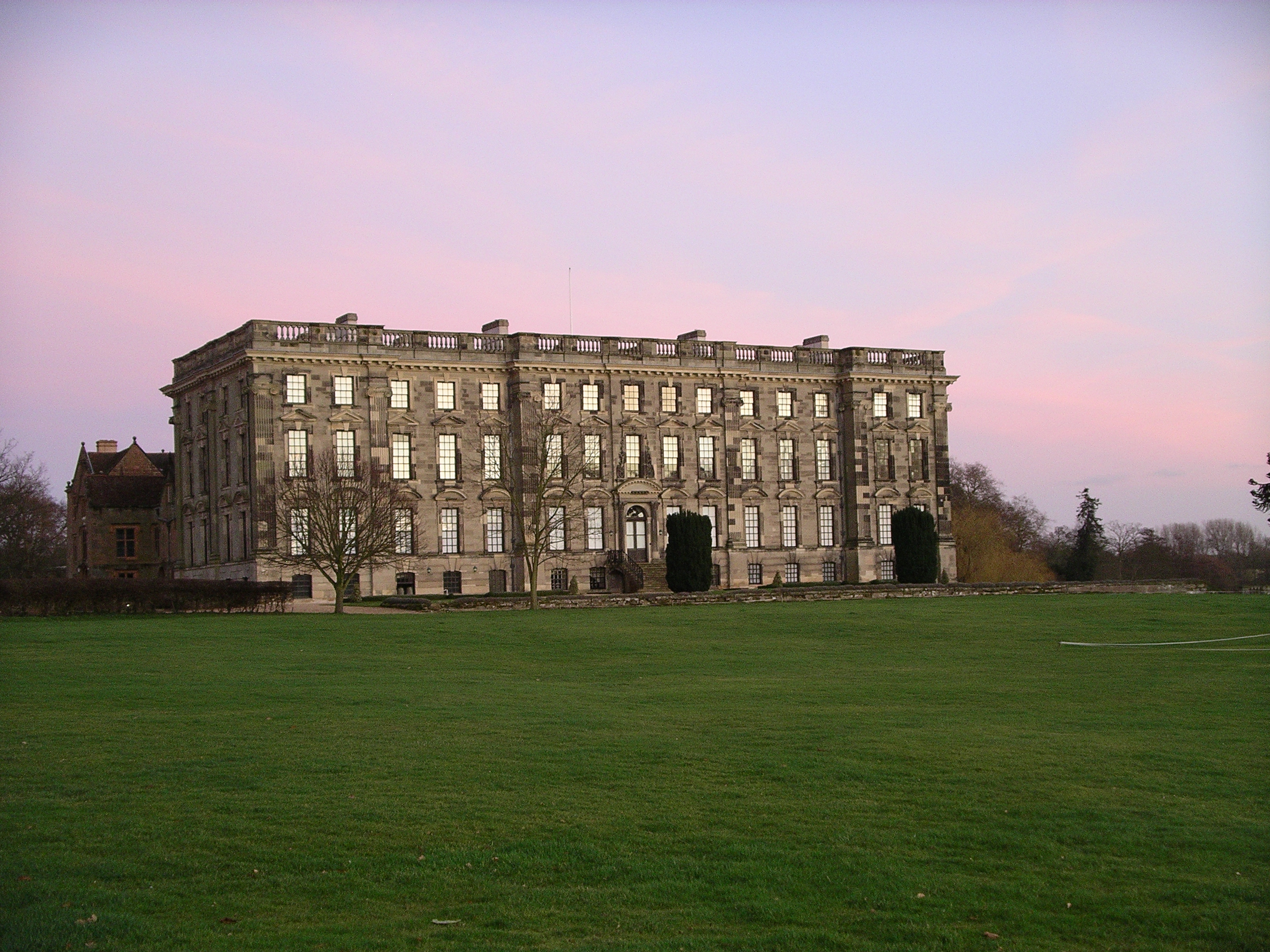
- Baroque west wing (photo 2008, evening dusk)
- Interactive map of Stoneleigh Abbey
- 52°20′19″N 1°32′01″W
- Location: Stoneleigh, Warwickshire, England

History
- Built: 1154 (Cistercian Abbey); 1561 (North and East wings); 1714–1726 (West Wing)
- Original use: Country house and estate

Site notes
- Area: 690 acres (280 ha) grounds
- Architect: Francis Smith of Warwick (West Wing)
- Architectural styles: Baroque exterior Georgian interiors
- Restored: 1996–2000 (after 1960 fire of the West wing)
- Current use: Stately home open to the public
- Governing body: Stoneleigh Abbey Charitable Trust
- Owner: Stoneleigh Abbey Charitable Trust
- Website: www.stoneleighabbey.org

Listed Building – Grade I
- Official name: Stoneleigh Abbey
- Designated: 11 April 1967
- Reference no.: 1035149

Listed Building – Grade II*
- Official name: Stables and Riding School 100 Yards North East of Stoneleigh Abbey
- Designated: 30 November 1982
- Reference no.: 1364976

Listed Building – Grade II*
- Official name: Conservatory 7 Yards to South of the Abbey
- Designated: 11 April 1967
- Reference no.: 1087012

Listed Building – Grade I
- Official name: Stoneleigh Abbey Gatehouse 83 Yards to North West of Stoneleigh Abbey
- Designated: 11 April 1967
- Reference no.: 1335868

Listed Building – Grade II
- Official name: C19 Engine House and Remains of C19 Water Engine Within, 100 Metres South-west of Abbey
- Designated: 26 November 2002
- Reference no.: 1096009

Listed Building – Grade II*
- Official name: Iron Gate and Screen 11 Yards to South of South Wing of Stoneleigh Abbey
- Designated: 23 January 1987
- Reference no.: 1086942

Listed Building – Grade II*
- Official name: Iron Gate and Screen 11 Yards to South of South Wing of Stoneleigh Abbey
- Designated: 23 January 1987
- Reference no.: 1086942

Listed Building – Grade II*
- Official name: New Bridge
- Designated: 10 Septempbe 1973
- Reference no.: 1035264

National Register of Historic Parks and Gardens
- Official name: Stoneleigh Abbey Park and Garden
- Type: Grade II*
- Designated: 1 February 1986
- Reference no.: 1000377

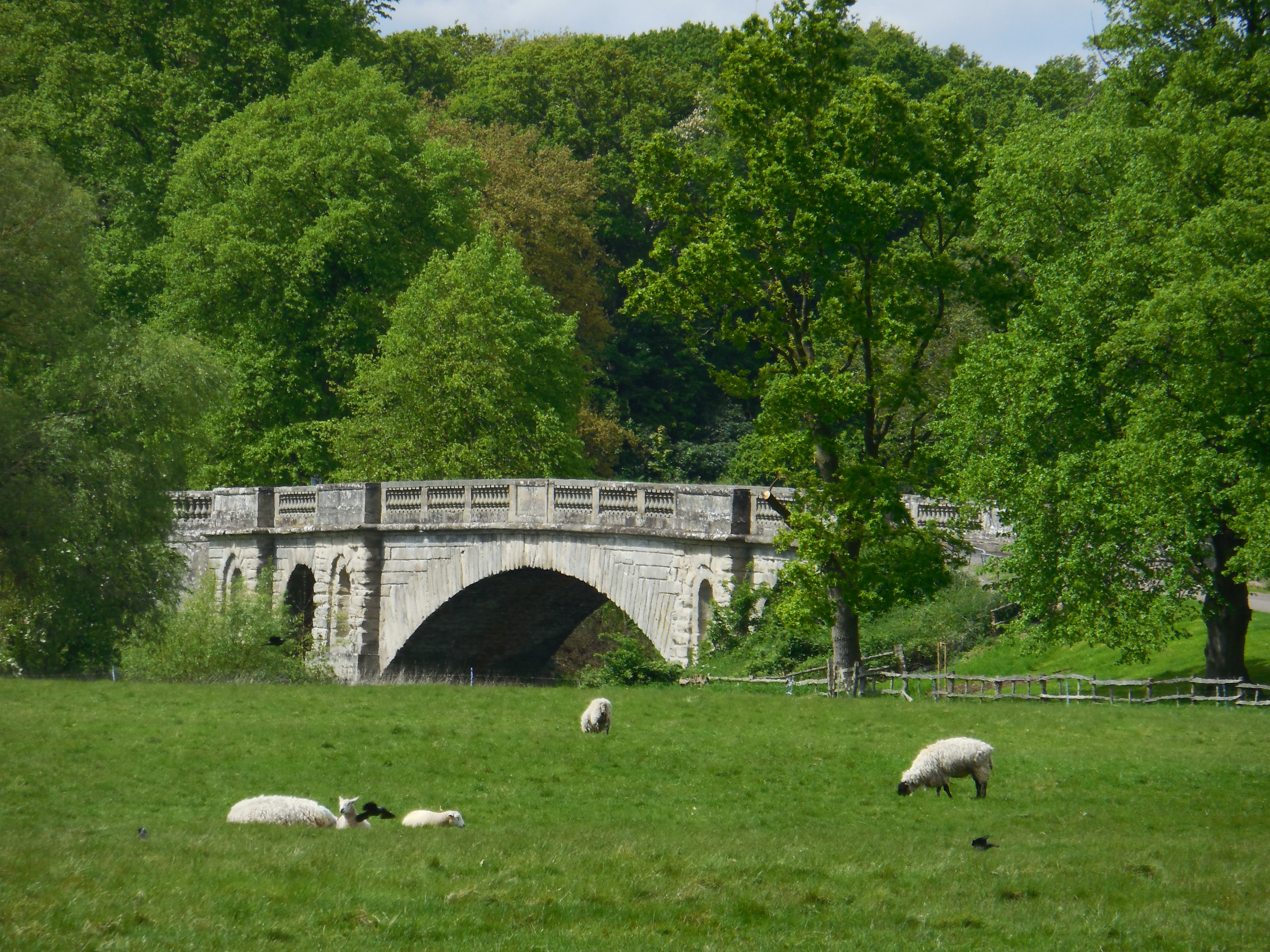
The three-arched stone New Bridge, designed by John Rennie the Elder, carries the Grecian Lodge Drive (the main entrance) over the River Avon.

Stoneleigh Abbey is an English country house and estate. It is situated in Warwickshire, England, near to the villange of Stoneleigh, Warwickshire and about three miles to the southeast of the city of Coventry. The Abbey is a Grade I listed building and the grounds are Grade II* listed (parks and gardens).

== History ==
In 1154 Henry II granted land in the Forest of Arden to a group of Cistercians from Staffordshire. There are various traces remaining of the original Abbey buildings, most notably the 14th-century Gatehouse.

After the Dissolution of the Monasteries the estate was acquired by Sir Thomas Leigh, Lord Mayor of London in 1558. Charles I gave Leigh the barony for his offering hospitality when the gates of Coventry were closed to the king during the English Civil War. A house was built (which now forms the north and east wings of the present house) on the site of the monastic buildings. It was the home of the Leigh family from 1561 to 1990. In due course the Leigh family became the largest land owner in Warwickshire.

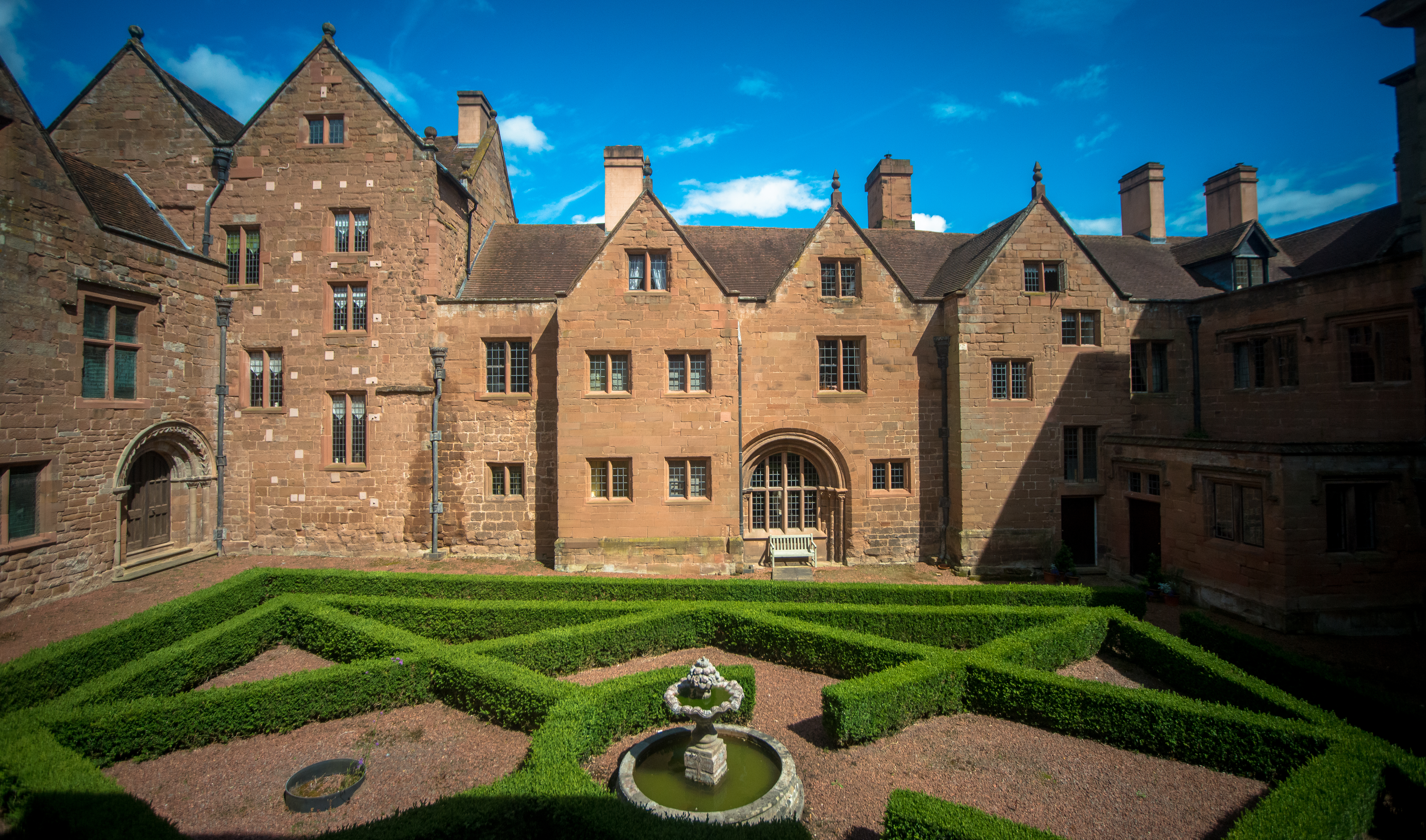
North and east wings of the house

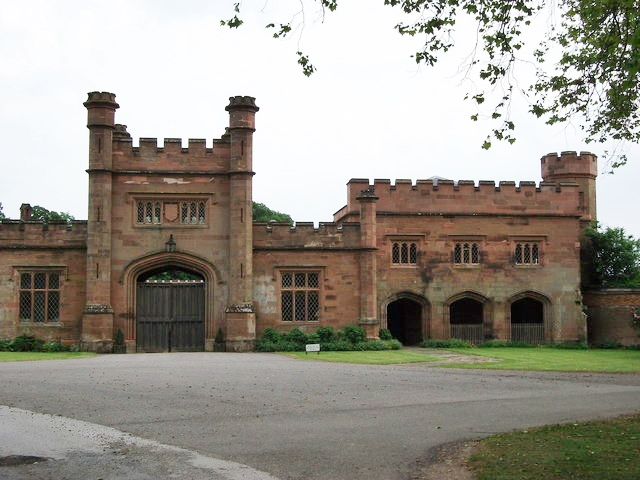
Entrance to the Stable Block

Between 1714 and 1726 a new palatial four-storey fifteen-bay wing was built to designs by architect Francis Smith of Warwick. The result was an impressive baroque West Wing, built of silver-coloured stone, which was fashionable at that time. The Abbey's remarkable feature is the Saloon, one of the great interiors of Georgian England. Andor Gomme referred to it as "almost the swan song of baroque figurative plasterwork in England".

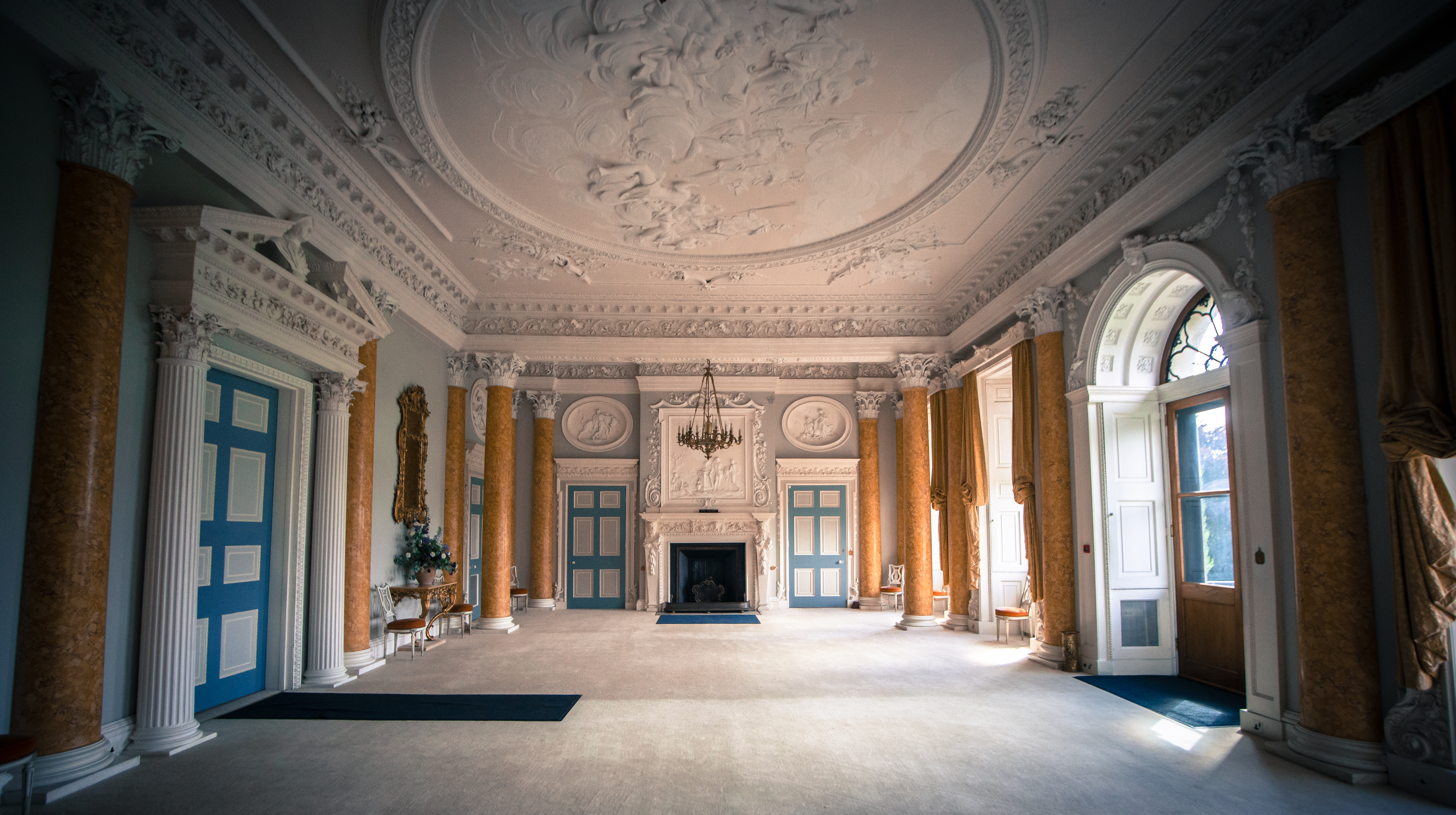
Saloon

From the view over the River Avon we can see some of the changes introduced by Humphry Repton. During his time he was well known for his works at several large country houses.

In 1806 the estate passed to Rev. Thomas Leigh. He came to view his inheritance, bringing with him his cousin Cassandra Austen and her two daughters, Cassandra and Jane. Jane Austen writes of Repton as the gardener making changes to the grounds at the fictional Sotherton Court in Mansfield Park. When he undertook the works at Stoneleigh, he hoped to create an arcade on the side of the house overlooking the river. That never came to fruition, however he did redirect the river (Avon) and flood a section of the river to create a mirror lake. When viewed from a raised platform across the river, the house is perfectly reflected in the surface of the water. There were two small parterres in front of this side of the house where the grass is now, along with other features of the grounds that can be viewed by walking along the paths (wilderness, mill bridge, weirs, etc.)

The adjacent stables and riding school block and the conservatory are separately listed as Grade II*.

Up until the early 1800s, this side of the house would have looked out on a yard with sheds, pigsties, and other ‘unsightly’ outbuildings. It was during this time that considerations for the health of residents saw the outbuildings move away from the house. This opened up a good view from the new West Wing, and allowed space for the creation of a cricket pitch. William Henry Leigh's second son Edward Chandos was an avid cricket player, and was delighted when his father allowed the pitch to be built. It is said that Lord Leigh would give a silver sixpence to any boy who could break a window of the house with a ball. It is still used today by Stoneleigh Cricket club and has been voted the most beautiful cricket pitch in England by Wisden.

One of the rooms of the West Wing hosts the bust of Byron by Edward Hodges Baily. Chandos Leigh and Lord Byron were school friends at Harrow and dined together on the day before Byron left England for the last time in April 1816.

Queen Victoria stayed in Stoneleigh Abbey for two nights in 1858. Victoria was given a suite of five rooms with mahogany furniture painted white and gold, since William Henry Leigh was told this was the Queen's preference.

== Modern times ==
In 1946 Stoneleigh Abbey was one of the first stately homes to open its doors to the public. In 1960 a disastrous fire did extensive damage to the West Wing.

In 1996 Lord Leigh transferred the ownership of Stoneleigh Abbey and its 690-acre (279 ha) grounds to a charitable trust, the Stoneleigh Abbey Preservation Trust, of which he himself was the Trustee. Between 1996 and 2000 it was extensively renovated with the help of grants including a £7.3 million grant from the Heritage Lottery Fund and additional grants of more than £3 million from English Heritage fund and the European Union. More than 1,000 tonnes of Grinshill stone were used to restore the exterior of the West Wing and up to 45 stonemasons were employed during the main stage of the work. The upstairs floors were initially converted into flats by Kit Martin and houses and apartments were established in the West Wing, South Wing and East Wing. The money received by the original Preservation charitable trust was the subject of an episode of The Mark Thomas Comedy Product, which proved that some of the trust's debts were paid using the National Lottery money earmarked for restoration, as well as paying for private development. With the failure of the preservation trust under Lord Leigh, a new independent charitable trust was set up to safeguard the future of the Abbey. With the ties to Lord Leigh severed, the new charitable trust acquired a new chairman, local business man Tony Bird OBE. In the early 2000s Charles Church built two groups of houses in the grounds of Stoneleigh Abbey, named The Cunnery and Grovehurst Park.

The property remains open to the public. The former Orangery now houses a tea room.

A historic pump house and water wheel at Stoneleigh Abbey has been restored to its former glory as part of a large restoration project to save and protect structures in the grounds, along with reinstating many of the views and walks inspired by Sir Humphry Repton's designs from his Red Book also on display at the Abbey. As Chairman of the Stoneleigh Abbey Charitable Trust, Bird has overseen the full restoration not only of the large wheel but also the full restoration of the 1851 Tangye of Birmingham water pump. The repairs to the Pump House were partly funded by Natural England, including replacement of the roof, years of lime scale being chipped off, and the water wheel itself restored. Stoneleigh Abbey Trustee Dorothy Ingle said: “It is wonderful to see the wheel turning and people being able to see how the pump house was used now fully restored to its former glory. The wheel doesn’t pump water to the house any more but it still represents part of the history of how the garden and house was operated 100 years ago." The pump-house was built in 1851 on the site of the Abbey's former medieval water mill on the River Avon. Visitors can now see the restored pump house as part of the Abbey's country park.
