= Claverdon =

Village and civil parish in Warwickshire, England

Coordinates: 52.2799°N 1.7106°W

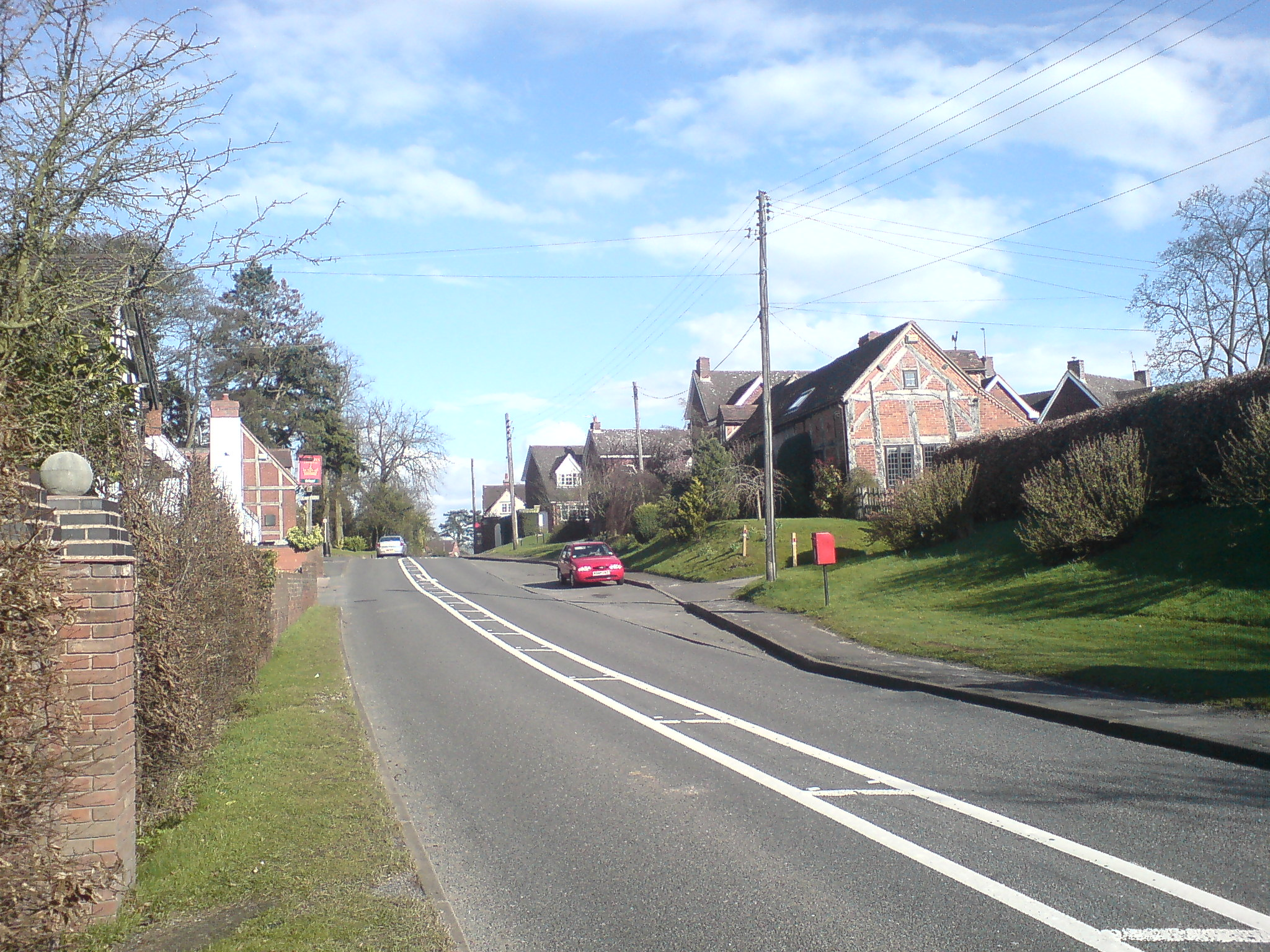

- Location within Warwickshire
- Population: 1,261 (2011)
- OS grid reference: SP1965
- Civil parish: Claverdon
- District: Stratford-on-Avon
- Shire county: Warwickshire
- Region: West Midlands
- Country: England
- Sovereign state: United Kingdom
- Post town: Warwick
- Postcode district: CV35
- Dialling code: 01926
- Police: Warwickshire
- Fire: Warwickshire
- Ambulance: West Midlands
- UK Parliament: Stratford-on-Avon

Claverdon is a village and civil parish in the Stratford-on-Avon district of Warwickshire, England, about 5 miles (8.0 km) west of the county town of Warwick. Claverdon's toponym comes from the Old English for "clover hill". The hill is near the centre of the scattered parish which included the township of Langley to the south, and formerly comprised the manors of Claverdon, Langley, Kington (to the south-west), and Songar (in the south-east).

There are hamlets near the church and at Yarningale, Kington, Lye Green, and Gannaway; and there is also a group of houses near the school. It includes modern development along with historic buildings: the forge; The Stone Building; St Michael's Church; and 16th and 17th century half-timbered cottages.

== History ==
The Manor of Claverdon is recorded in the Domesday Book as part of the lands of the Count of Meulan, Robert of Beaumont who had inherited Meulan through his mother. It states; "In Ferncombe Hundred, (Clavendone) Claverdon, Bovi held it; he was a free man. 3 hides. Land for 5 ploughs. In lordship 1. 12 villages with a priest and 14 smallholders have 5 ploughs. 3 slaves. Meadow, 16 acres; woodland, 1 league; when exploited, value 10s. The value was 40s; now £4." The estate passed to the Earls of Warwick when Robert's brother, Henry, keeper of Warwick Castle since 1068, was created Earl of Warwick soon after 1086 and was granted Robert's Warwickshire lands, supplemented again by those of Thorkell of Arden. It was forfeited in 1397 by Thomas de Beauchamp, for treason and granted, to Thomas, Earl of Kent, but restored to the Earl on the accession of Henry IV.

In 1487 it came to the Crown and passed through various hands, being leased in 1517 for 21 years to Thomas Sherwyn, and its demesnes to Roger Walford. In, December 1547, the lordship was granted to John Dudley, Earl of Warwick, after whose execution the manor, in June 1554, was assigned to his widow Joan for life. Ambrose Dudley, fourth son of the Duke of Northumberland, was created Earl of Warwick in 1561 and received the Warwick estates, including the manor of Claverdon, which he sold in 1568 to Sir John Spencer, a member of a branch of the Spencer family, from whom Diana, Princess of Wales was descended. They remained Lord of the manor until 1716. Sir John died on 8 November 1586, having settled the manor on his second son Thomas, who died in 1630 and Claverdon passed, to his great-nephew Sir William Spencer of Yarnton, in Oxfordshire.

Sir William Spencer in 1635 married Constance daughter of Sir Thomas Lucy and Alice Lucy (née Spencer) of Charlecote Park, and dying in 1647 was succeeded by his son Sir Thomas Spencer, MP. Sir Thomas died on 6 March 1685 at the age of 46 years without surviving male issue, his widow Jane survived till 20 April 1712 as lady of the manor, but after her death the manor was sold about the year 1716 by the four surviving daughters, to Andrew Archer of Tanworth. Upon the death of Andrew Archer in 1741 the larger portion of his estate including the manor of Claverdon and the chief farms therein known as Park, Lodge, Breach, Gannaway, and the Reddings descended to his eldest son Thomas, created first Baron Archer of Umberslade in 1747.

== Economy ==
Whilst there are no large employers in the area, most residents commute to larger towns nearby, there are a number of small businesses locally. Claverdon Cartridges, supplying shooting equipment and clothing and the 4 star Ardencote Manor Hotel Country Club & Spa. The village shop was closed in 2007 and the butcher's shop, which also houses the Post Office, broadened its range of items, however it could not offer newspapers. Eventually, after a long wait, the community shop was created replacing the village shop but not housed in the former premises. It was originally housed in a steel hut next to the Dorothea Mitchell Hall, the Surgery and the Tennis Club. A permanent structure has now been built for it in the same place. The aforementioned butchers shop closed down, and has since been sub-divided into two residential properties.

== Governance ==
Claverdon is part of Stratford-on-Avon District Council and represented by Councillor John Horner, Conservative . Nationally it is part of Stratford-on-Avon, whose current MP is Nadhim Zahawi of the Conservative Party. Prior to Brexit in 2020 it was part of the West Midlands electoral region of the European Parliament.

== Notable buildings ==
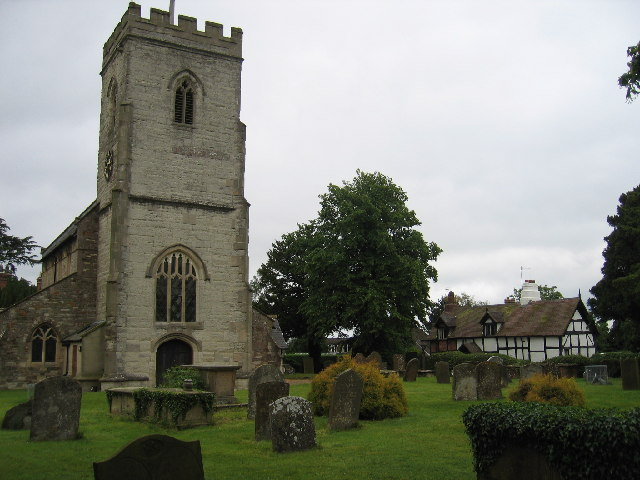
St Michael and All Angels, Claverdon, Warwickshire

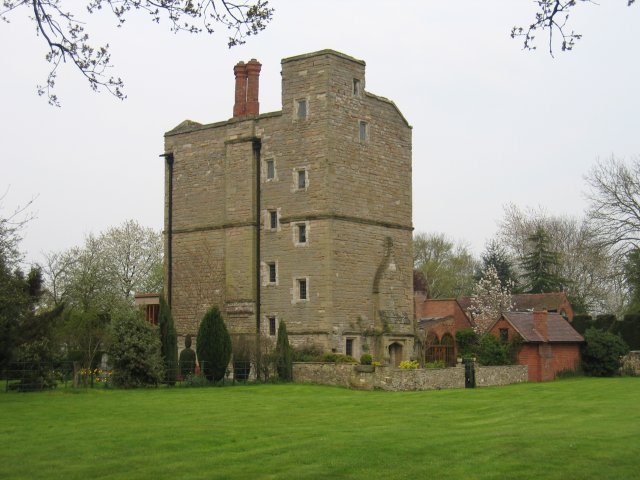
Stone Building

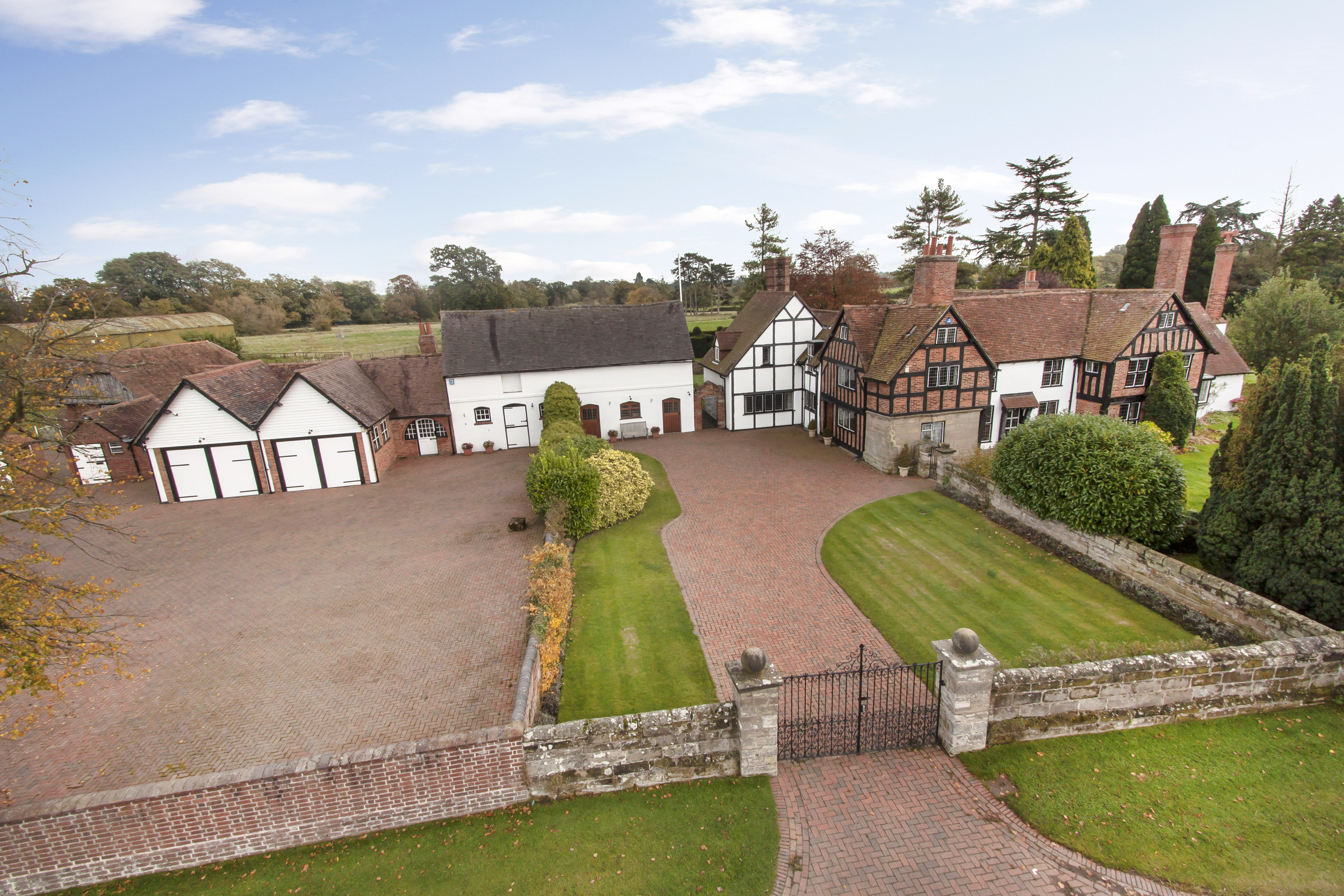
Claverdon Hall

The reference to a priest in the Domesday Book may indicate that the village had a church at that time. However, Claverdon has had a parish church of Saint Michael and All Angels since the 1150s with the oldest parts of the present structure dating from the 14th century. The English Gothic architecture bell tower is 15th century and was restored in either 1830 or 1930. The church was rebuilt in 1877–78 to designs by the Gothic Revival architect Ewan Christian. The tower has a ring of six bells. Three including the treble were cast by Lester and Pack of the Whitechapel Bell Foundry in east London in 1757, two including the tenor were cast by John Warner and Sons of Cripplegate in London in 1892, and one was cast by John Taylor & Co of Loughborough in 1914.

The vicar at the time of the Puritan Survei of the Ministrie in Warwickshire of 1586 was described thus Edward Miller, vicar a dumbe & vnlearned hirelling a verie disordered person. A common Jester & alehouse-haunter, a shifter, a buier & seller of lande. He once laied the communion cup to pawne. He serueth at two cures cursorie, videlicet, at Norton & Claredon. The valew of both is knowen to be well worth xxv" by the yeare. What other composition is betweene Mr Bucke and him who placed him there that is vnknowen. Edward Miller was instituted to the vicarage on 29 July 1574 and was vicar until his resignation in 1586.

Stone Building, 3/4-mile north east of the village, is probably of the 17th century and is of a type very rare in the Midlands being a tower house in the North English sense, not fortified but defensible within bounds. It is said to have been the north-western of the four angle-towers of the great house begun by Thomas Spencer, who died in 1630 and whose monument stands in the church. There are no traces whatever of the remainder of any great house above ground, nor are there any indications where this tower joined up with the ranges of the house. Claverdon Hall is a Grade II listed part half-timbered country house. Nikolaus Pevsner makes no reference to the Hall which may be a 17th-century house, perhaps earlier, but which was restored in the 20th century and much altered, its walls are rough-cast and the roof tiled.

Claverdon Hall is recorded in 1485, though it is possible that its origins were even older than that, having roots which go all the way back to Anglo-Saxon times, pre-Norman Conquest, the earliest fabric of the existing hall would be 400 years or so later. The hall is noted for the fine oak panelling, of 15th century date and added in 1939 to the reception hall, dining room and the deep oak framed leaded light windows. The large panelled oak door in the Hall opens into an under stairs store, reputed to be a former priest's hole during the Reformation period and from which, many years ago, it is said there was an underground passage which may have led to Stone Building in Manor Lane. The list of important family names associated with the manor are described in the section under history, most notably a branch of the Spencers of Althorp, Northamptonshire from whom Diana, Princess of Wales was descended.

== Community facilities ==
The village has a GP Surgery located on Station Road.

== Transport ==
The village is served by Claverdon railway station with trains operated by Chiltern Railways and West Midlands Trains giving access to Stratford-upon-Avon, Leamington Spa, Birmingham Moor Street and London Marylebone. The M40 motorway is located nearby giving access to Birmingham, Warwick and London. Birmingham Airport is situated 16 miles (26 km) to the North, with flights to Europe, Asia and America.

== Sports and leisure ==
There are many sports clubs in the village which are well supported by parishioners. They also attract a much wider population which sustain the clubs through membership but also, as a consequence, maintain the venues aesthetically. The Rugby Club run two teams on a Saturday and on a Sunday have a thriving mini / junior section which is very successful. The village supports the club through players and through use of the clubhouse for social events. The Football Club run Saturday and Sunday adult teams and junior teams. On Saturday 7 April 2017, Claverdon FC clinched the Birmingham FA Saturday Amateur Cup with a thrilling 2–1 victory over Tamworth Under-21s. The Recreation Field is vital to the club with its maintenance and upkeep being crucial. The Recreation Field is shared in the summer by the cricket team who maintain the wicket and outfield through limited club funds.

The Cricket Club is important to the village as its actions ensure a well kept Recreation Field to all parishioners. The Tennis Club is active with a good membership. The sustainability of the tennis club is important to the village from the point of presentation due to its central location. Other sports clubs and fitness classes, such as badminton use the Church Centre and Dorothea Mitchell Hall. There are two public houses, The Crown on Henley Street and the Red Lion on Station Road, ¼ mile west of the church. It may be one of the oldest buildings in the village, as it has some close set studding of the 16th century and a wide fireplace with a moulded lintel and the roof is tiled.

== Education ==
Claverdon Primary School is an English mixed primary school located in Breach Lane in the village of Claverdon. It is within the Warwickshire Local Education Authority (LEA) area and has 187 students. The school's house system is named after the surrounding areas (Kington, Gannaway and Yarningale).

School	Compulsory education stage	Ofsted details
Claverdon Primary School	Primary	Ofsted details for unique reference number 125507

== Geography ==
The village lies chiefly at a height of about 400 ft. above sea-level, the soil being Red Keuper Marl overlaid with pockets of clay, gravel, and sand. With the exception of Yarningale Common, the whole parish is now under cultivation.

== Sources ==
- Pevsner, Nikolaus; Wedgwood, Alexandra (1966). The Buildings of England: Warwickshire. Harmondsworth: Penguin Books. p. 233.
- Styles, Philip, ed. (1945). Victoria County History: A History of the County of Warwick, Volume 3: Barlichway Hundred. pp. 69–73.
