= Robert Johnson (died 1730) =

English-born Irish judge

Robert Johnson (c.1657-1730) was an English-born politician and judge in early eighteenth-century Ireland. He sat in the Irish House of Commons and was appointed a Baron of the Exchequer. In the early 1700s, he was one of an inner circle of trusted advisors to the Lord Lieutenant of Ireland.

He was born in England, the eldest son of Robert Johnson senior and grandson of Edward Johnson, Bencher of the Inner Temple. The Johnsons were related to the leading Minister Henry Bennet, 1st Earl of Arlington: the relationship was close enough for Arlington to further the Johnson family's interests. His father, who was also a barrister, came to Ireland after the Restoration of Charles II as secretary to Sir Edward Smith, the Chief Justice of the Irish Common Pleas and had a successful career, despite his chronic ill-health. He sat briefly in the Irish House of Commons as member for Lisburn in the session of 1665-6 and was a justice of the Court of Common Pleas 1670–86.

== Career ==
Robert, the son, was admitted to the Inner Temple, when still at school, at his grandfather's request. He was educated at Trinity College Dublin and matriculated in 1671. He entered the King's Inns in 1677. Like his father he entered the Irish House of Commons, sitting first as member for Trim and later for Athboy. He enjoyed the patronage of James Butler, 2nd Duke of Ormonde, later Lord Lieutenant of Ireland, and became one of his crucial advisors or "managers". A handwritten "managerial list" identifying those MPs who supported Ormonde as Lord Lieutenant and those who opposed him, which was prepared by Johnson in 1706, survives.

In 1703 he was elevated to the Bench as Baron of the Court of Exchequer (Ireland). As noted above he was also a crucial member of the Duke of Ormonde's managerial team, even after he became a judge, and corresponded with him regularly. Even in an age of bitter political faction, he was described as a "fanatical Tory". Such views, which were common among the Irish political class under Queen Anne of England, were not acceptable after the change of dynasty in 1714, especially after his great patron Ormonde, now revealed as a Jacobite, fled to France in 1715. Even though Johnson had always denounced Jacobitism, and had openly welcomed the accession of the House of Hanover, he was dismissed from the Bench, as were nearly all of Queen Anne's Irish judges, although his dismissal was postponed into the New Year.

In 1716, like his former colleagues, he was closely questioned by the House of Commons about the role which the High Court judges had played in the bitter clash between the central government and Dublin Corporation in 1712–3, which had brought the whole administration to a standstill. He admitted that the judges' behaviour had been improper, but no action was taken against him.

In 1721 there was some prospect of a return to the Bench, as his lifelong friend (and future son-in-law) Sir Richard Levinge, 1st Baronet, was now Chief Justice of the Irish Common Pleas. Levinge, who was himself a Tory, though a very moderate one, had a low opinion of his fellow judges and of most of their possible replacements, and urged Johnson's reappointment. However, Johnson was still considered too extreme a Tory: he was passed over and lived out his last decade in retirement in County Kildare.

== Family ==
He married in 1681 Margaret Dixon, daughter of Sir Richard Dixon of Calverstown, County Kildare and Mary Eustace, and aunt of Robert Dixon, judge of the Court of Common Pleas (Ireland); she cannot have been much more than fifteen at the time. They had one son, yet another Robert, who predeceased his father, and at least two daughters, Mary (died 1757) and Frances. Mary married as his second wife her father's close friend Sir Richard Levinge, who was more than forty years her senior. Although Levinge was close to seventy and in constant pain from gout, they managed to have one son, also named Richard, born just before his father's death. Young Richard lived mainly on the Dixon estate at Calverstown, presumably as a permanent guest of his relative Mr Justice Dixon. Mary in 1732 remarried Charles Annesley, a grandson of the Earl of Anglesey.

Frances married Hon. Robert Allen, a younger son of John Allen, 1st Viscount Allen and Mary FitzGerald, and had five children, of whom at least two daughters, also called Mary and Frances, reached adult life.

== Sources ==
- Ball, F. Elrington The Judges in Ireland 1221-1921 London John Murray 1926
- Bergin, John "Levinge, Sir Richard" Cambridge Dictionary of Irish Biography
- Debrett's Peerage 1828 edition
- Hayton, David "Ruling Ireland 1685-1742: Politics, Politicians and Parties" Boydell Press 2004
- Kenny, Colum King's Inns and the Kingdom of Ireland Dublin Irish Academic Press 1992
- Neill, Trevor Lisburn Parliamentary Representatives in the Seventeenth Century (1995) Lisburn Historical Society Journal Vol.9
- Smyth, Constantine Joseph "Chronicle of the Law Officers of Ireland" Butterworths London 1839
