= John Leigh (Yarmouth MP) =

English politician

Sir John Leigh (1598–1666) was an English politician who sat in the House of Commons at various times between 1640 and 1660.

Leigh was the eldest son of Barnaby Leigh of Northcourt in the Isle of Wight and his first wife Elizabeth Bampfield, daughter of Hugh Bampfield of North Cadbury, Somerset. His grandfather, also named Sir John Leigh, had bought Northcourt in 1586, and began the building of the manor house, which still exists.

He matriculated at Christ Church, Oxford on 25 October 1616, aged 18. He succeeded to the family estates in 1642. He was knighted at Bewley or Southwick on 1 September 1628.

In 1640, Leigh was elected Member of Parliament for Yarmouth (Isle of Wight) in the Long Parliament. He apparently never spoke in Parliament. As Colonel of the Isle of Wight Trained Bands he held the island for Parliament during the Civil War from 1642 to 1647. He was also a Deputy Lieutenant in 1643, a commissioner for sequestrations for Hampshire and a commissioner for levying money in 1643. He was a commissioner for assessment for the Isle of Wight from 1647 to 1648. He did not sit in parliament after Pride's Purge in 1648. He was commissioner for assessment for Hampshire in 1648, 1652, 1657 and 1660 and a JP for Hampshire. He was described as a man who had a strong reluctance to quarrel with anyone.

In April 1660, Leigh was re-elected MP for Yarmouth for the Convention Parliament. It is unclear if he stood for election again in 1661. He was commissioner for assessment for the Isle of Wight from 1664 until his death which probably occurred in 1666.

== Family ==
Leigh married Anne Bulkeley, daughter of William Bulkeley of Nether Burgate, Fordingbridge, Hampshire and had two sons and three daughters, including John, his heir, and Elizabeth, who married Sir Peter Stanley, 2nd Baronet, of Alderley, Cheshire.

Parliament of England
Preceded by William Oglander; John Bulkeley	Member of Parliament for Yarmouth (Isle of Wight); 1640–1648; With: Viscount L'Isle	Succeeded by Unrepresented in Rump Parliament
Preceded by Viscount L'Isle	Member of Parliament for Yarmouth (Isle of Wight); 1660; With: Viscount L'Isle; Richard Lucy	Succeeded by Richard Lucy; Edward Smith
