= Godfrey Bosvile =

English politician

Arms of Bosville: Argent, five lozenges conjoined in fess gules and in chief three bear's heads erased at the neck sable muzzled or as quartered (with a canton ermine ) by the Bosville Macdonald baronets of Thorpe Hall, Rudston

Colonel Godfrey Bosvile II (1596–1658) (or Bosville) was an English politician who sat in the House of Commons from 1640 to 1653. He fought on the Parliamentarian side in the English Civil War.

Bosvile was the son of Captain Ralph Bosvile of a knightly family of Gunthwaite, Yorkshire and his wife Margaret Copley. He was baptised on 12 April 1596 at Sprotbrough, Yorkshire. His father died in Ireland in 1601 and his mother remarried Fulke Greville (1575-1632); his younger half-brother Robert Greville, 2nd Baron Brooke became a leading Puritan activist.

In April 1640, Bosvile was elected Member of Parliament for Warwick in the Short Parliament. He was re-elected MP for Warwick in December 1640 for the Long Parliament and sat through to the Rump Parliament.

Bosvile took the protestation, and was appointed commissioner for Yorkshire, Warwick and Coventry. He obtained a commission in the Parliamentary army and he rose to the rank of colonel. In 1643, he marched from Coventry with eight hundred horses, and took the garrisoned house of Sir Thomas Holt. In 1644 he assisted Colonel Purefoy of Warwickshire, at the siege of Banbury. His name was put down as one of the commissioners of the high court of justice to try the king, but he declined taking any part in the trial.

Bosvile died at the age of 62 in Gunthwaite, Yorkshire.

Bosvile married Margery Greville daughter of Sir Edward Greville in 1616.

== See also ==
- William Bosville (1745–1813), his descendant.

== Sources ==
- Hughes, Ann (2004). "Greville, Robert, second Baron Brooke of Beauchamps Court". Oxford Dictionary of National Biography (online ed.). Oxford University Press. doi:10.1093/ref:odnb/11518. (Subscription, Wikipedia Library access or UK public library membership required.)

Parliament of England
Vacant Parliament suspended since 1629	Member of Parliament for Warwick; 1640; With: William Purefoy	Succeeded by William Purefoy; Thomas Lucy
Preceded by William Purefoy; Thomas Lucy	Member of Parliament for Warwick; 1640–1653; With: William Purefoy	Not represented in Barebones Parliament
