= Edward Smith (judge) =

English politician and judge (1602–1682)

Sir Edward Smith or Smythe (1602–1682) was an English-born politician, barrister and judge who held the offices of Chief Justice of the Irish Common Pleas and judge of the Irish Court of Claims.

== Family ==
He was the second son of Edward Smythe, a barrister of Middle Temple, and his wife Katherine. The family's earlier history is uncertain, although it has been suggested that they were related to the Smythe Baronets of Eshe Hall, Durham, and also to Sir Thomas Smith (1513–1577), who was Secretary of State to Elizabeth I. Edward's sister, Arabella, described as "a lady of surpassing beauty and charm", married against both families' wishes a "wild young Oxford student" called Charles Howard, who later unexpectedly became the 3rd Earl of Nottingham.

Historian Michael Quane says that Edward was a nephew of Erasmus Smith, a landowner and philanthropist in both England and Ireland (the Erasmus Smith Trust, which Erasmus Smith founded for the education of Irish children, survives to this day).

Edward entered the Middle Temple in 1627, was called to the bar in 1635 and became a Bencher of his Inn of Court in 1655. He married, about 1648, Constance Lucy, daughter of Sir Thomas Lucy of Charlecote Park and his wife Alice Spencer (died 1648).

Constance was the sister of the politician Richard Lucy (as well as ten other siblings), and the widow of Sir William Spencer, 2nd Baronet of the Spencer Baronets, by whom she was the mother of Sir Thomas Spencer, 3rd Baronet. She and Edward had two sons.

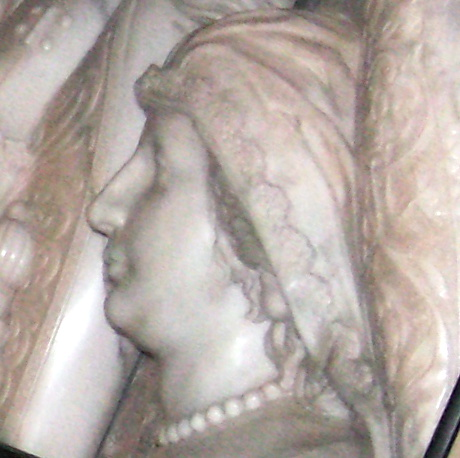
Detail of the tomb of Alice Lucy, Sir Edward Smith's mother-in-law, in St. Leonard's Church, Charlecote. Her husband Sir Thomas Lucy is buried in the same tomb.

== Career ==
The inscription on his tomb suggests that he was a member of the House of Commons at the outbreak of the English Civil War (although the first record of his election to the Commons is as MP for Yarmouth in 1661) and that he took Parliament's side in the conflict, though with considerable misgivings. The inscription states that he supported Parliament so long as it held out against the King and the Church of England: "that is, as long as there was room for wise politics". This implies that Smith opposed the execution of Charles I, which seems to be confirmed by the fact that after the Restoration his past career as a Parliamentarian was not held against him. He received a knighthood from Charles II in 1662, took his seat in the Commons as member for Yarmouth, and was sent to Ireland as a judge. He gained the goodwill, which was then crucial to the career of any Irish judge, of James Butler, 1st Duke of Ormonde, the Lord Lieutenant of Ireland, who found him to be honest, good-natured and hard-working.

== In Ireland ==
The Irish Act of Settlement 1662 was an effort, although not a very successful one, to sort out the numerous claims by dispossessed Irish landowners, most of them Roman Catholics, for the return of their lands which had been confiscated during the Civil War. A Court of Claims was set up with five judges, of whom Smith ranked as the most senior after Sir Richard Raynsford. He also entered the Irish House of Commons, sitting as MP for Lisburn from 1661 to 1665. The Court encountered so many difficulties in judging the claims of the dispossessed owners against the recently acquired rights of those (mostly Cromwellian soldiers) who had taken possession of their lands, that the Irish Parliament found it necessary to pass a second Act of Explanation in 1665, which re-established the Court. Smith continued as a member of it.

In 1665 he was appointed Chief Justice of the Court of Common Pleas (Ireland) and resigned his seat in the Irish House of Commons, while retaining his English seat. In a farewell speech to his Lisburn constituents he regretted that his public duties had made it impossible to attend properly to their affairs. His replacement as MP was his secretary Robert Johnston (died 1687), on whose behalf he lobbied vigorously. Elrington Ball suggests that he found the office of Chief Justice less financially rewarding than that of a judge of the Court of Claims, and he was accused of prolonging the life of the Court of Claims well past the point where it was doing any useful work. Early in 1669 he finally closed the proceedings, with a speech in praise of himself and his fellow judges for their impartiality and skill.

== Last years and death ==
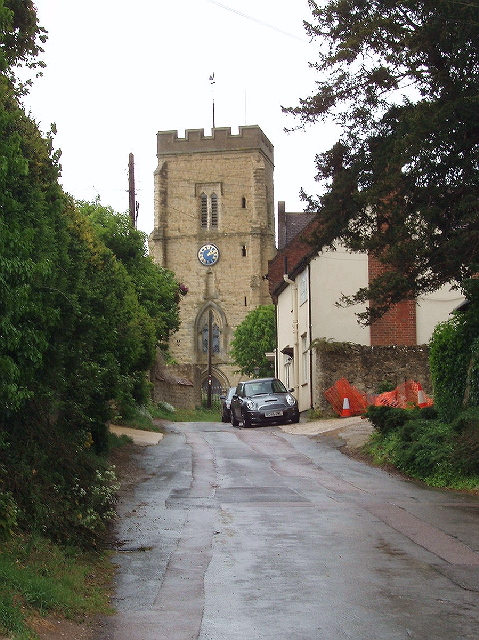
Church of St John the Evangelist, Whitchurch, Buckinghamshire, where Smith is buried

At the end of the same year, he resigned as Chief Justice, a move which was probably connected with the temporary downfall of his great patron, Ormonde, who had been removed from office as Lord Lieutenant earlier in the year. Ball suggests that he was not prepared to continue in the public service on only one income: but he was certainly rich enough to buy the manor of Whitchurch, Buckinghamshire, where he spent his later years. Smythe himself gave as his reason for his retirement his age and his inability to bear the burden of high office. Although he wrote to the King, when announcing his retirement, that he intended to spend his last years in religious contemplation, he retained his seat in the Commons, and was reasonably diligent in attendance there until he stepped down as an MP in 1678. He died in February 1682; Whitchurch passed to his elder son Edward, who died in 1690, and then to his younger son who died in 1694. Neither son had any issue

Smith is buried in the Church of St. John the Evangelist, Whitchurch. The inscription, written in rather difficult Latin, describes his career as a judge and justifies his opposition to the King during the Civil War. His virtues are described in the inscription at length: rich in honour and learning, devout, modest, courteous and honest.

Legal offices
Preceded by James Donnellan	Chief Justice of the Irish Common Pleas; 1665–1670	Succeeded by Robert Booth
Parliament of England
Preceded by Richard Lucy; Sir John Leigh	Member of Parliament for Yarmouth, IoW; 1661–1679; With: Richard Lucy 1661-1678; Thomas Lucy 1678–1679	Succeeded by Thomas Lucy; Sir Richard Mason
Parliament of Ireland
New constituency	Member of Parliament for Lisburn; 1661–1665; With: Sir Edward Dering	Succeeded by Sir Edward Dering; Robert Johnson
