= Richard Lucy (1619–1677) =

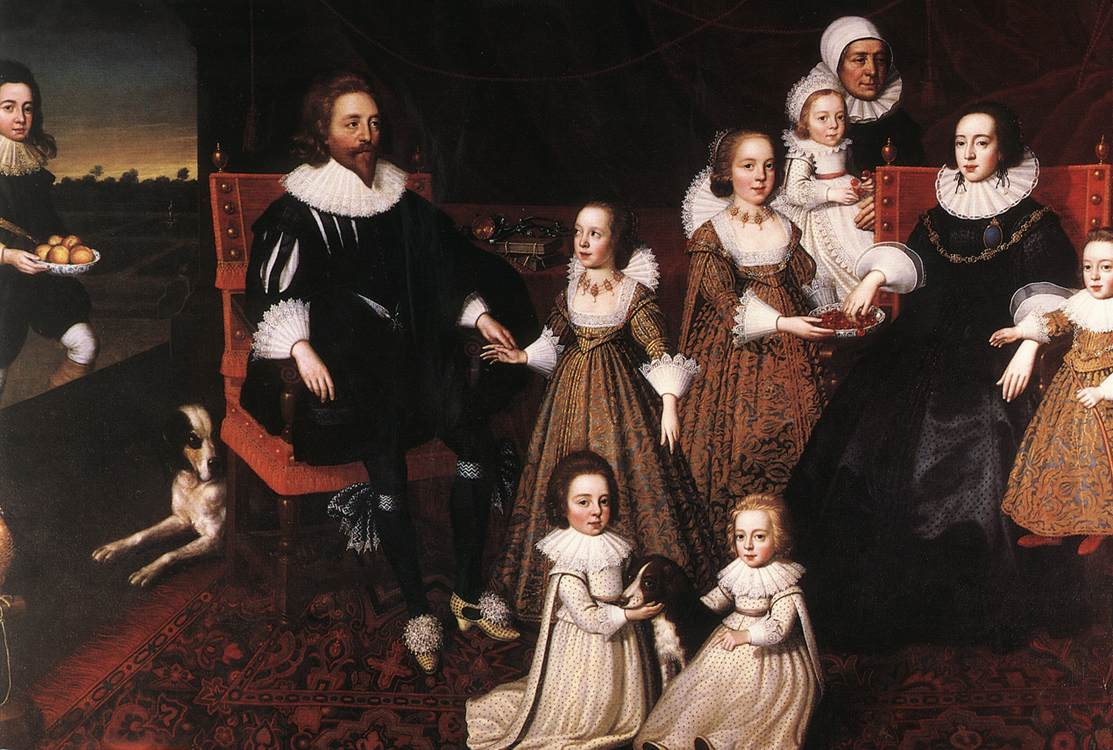
Lucy with his parents and siblings in the 1620s

Richard Lucy (1619 – 21 December 1677) of Charlecote Park, Warwickshire was an English landowner and politician who sat in the House of Commons from 1653.

== Life ==
Lucy was the third of the six sons of Sir Thomas Lucy of Charlecote and his wife Alice Spencer of Claverden, Warwickshire. He matriculated at Queen’s College, Oxford on 17 September 1634, aged 14. From 1637 to 1640, he travelled abroad. He was Sheriff of Warwickshire from 1646 to 1647. He was a student of Gray's Inn in 1652. He inherited Charlecote Park in 1658 after the death of his two elder brothers, Spencer and Richard.

In 1653, Lucy was nominated Member of Parliament for Warwickshire in the Barebones Parliament. He was re-elected MP for Warwickshire in 1654 for the First Protectorate Parliament and in 1656 for the Second Protectorate Parliament. He succeeded to the estate of Charlecote on the death of his brother in 1658. In 1659 he was elected MP for Warwickshire and for Yarmouth (Isle of Wight) and chose to sit for Warwickshire in the Third Protectorate Parliament.

In 1660 Lucy was elected MP for Yarmouth in the Convention Parliament, and quickly made his peace with the restored Stuart dynasty. He was re-elected MP for Yarmouth in the Cavalier Parliament, but played a relatively passive role in politics thereafter.

Lucy died in December 1677, at the age of 58: Charlecote passed to his only surviving son Thomas, and after Thomas's death without male issue, to Richard's nephew Davenport, eldest son of his youngest brother Sir Fulke, who also died in 1677.

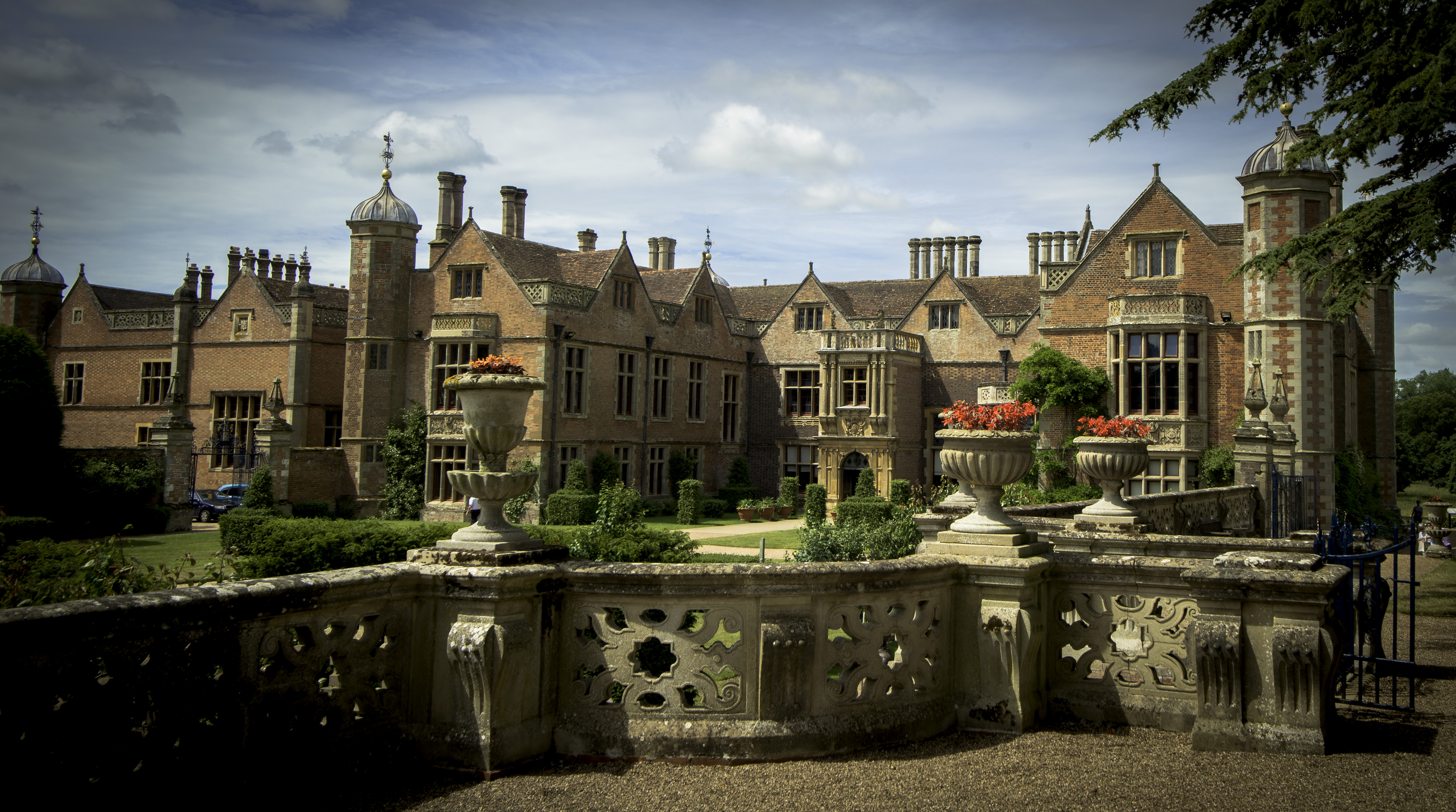
Charlecote Park, 2015

Lucy married Elizabeth Urrey, daughter of John Urrey of Thorley, Isle of Wight and had four sons and three daughters. Of his sons only Thomas, his heir, reached adulthood.

Richard had five brothers, including Sir Fulk Lucy, MP for Cheshire and six sisters including Constance, who married firstly Sir William Spencer, 2nd Baronet, and secondly Sir Edward Smith, who sat as Roger Lucy's fellow MP for Yarmouth, and was later appointed Chief Justice of the Irish Common Pleas.
