= Thomas Lucy (died 1640) =

English politician

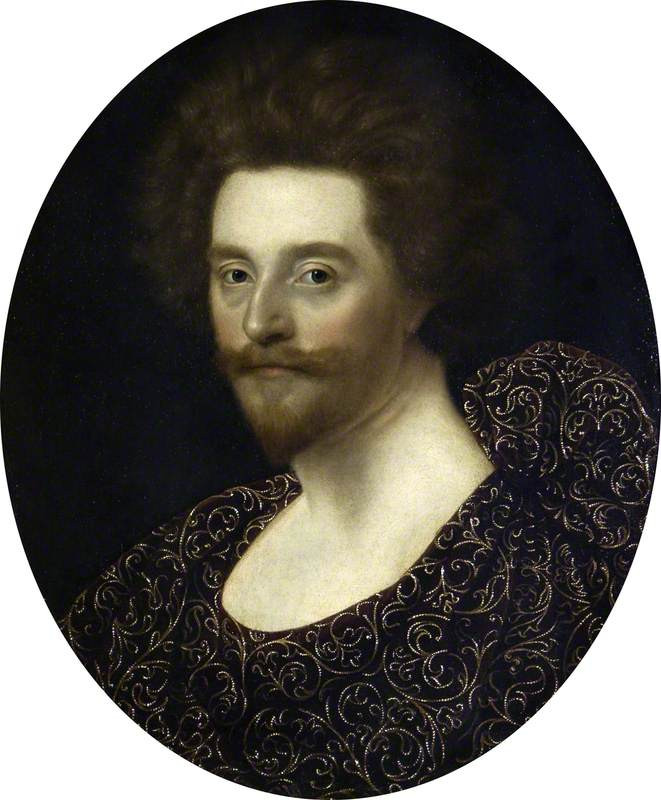
Sir Thomas Lucy III (1585–1640), MP by William Larkin

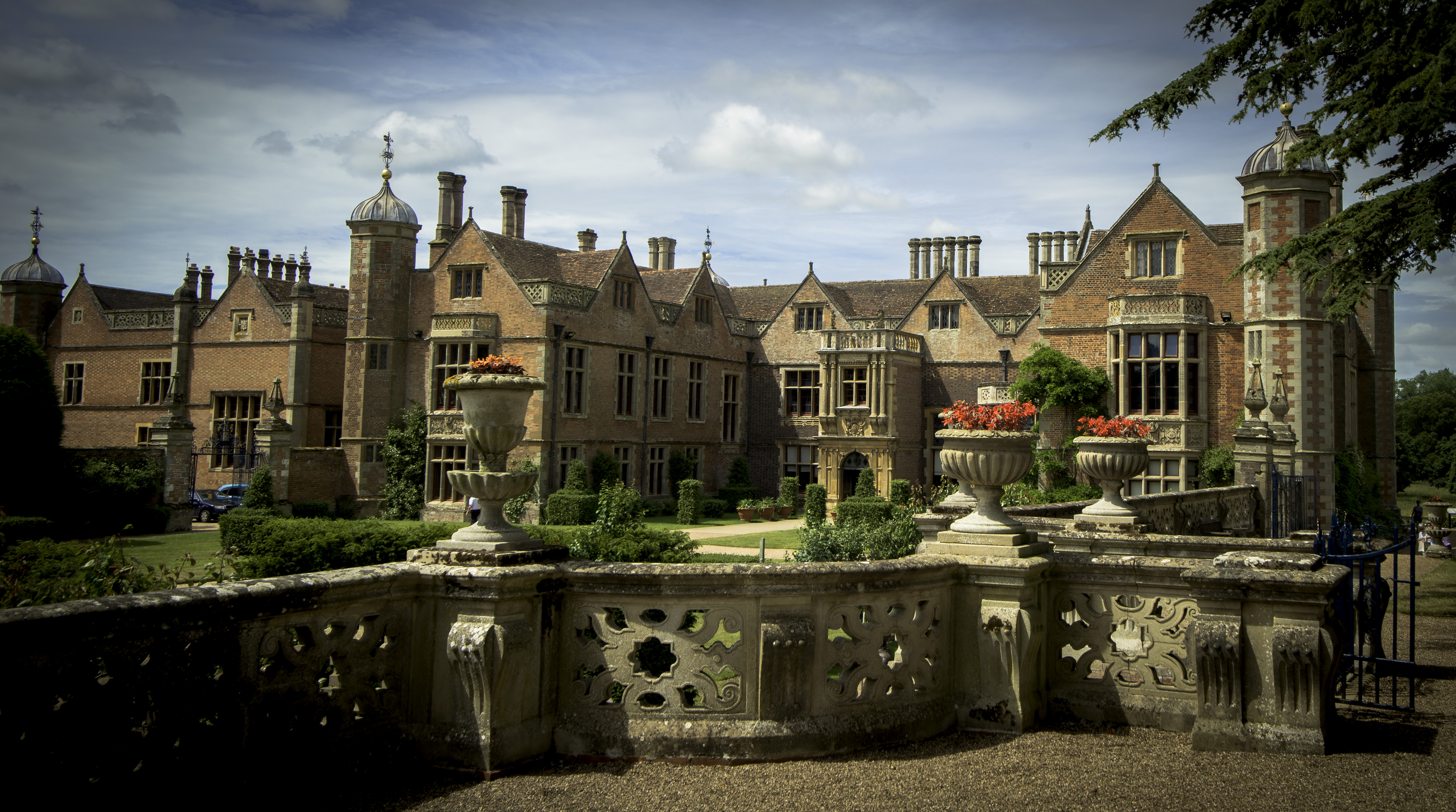
Charlecote Park in 2015

Sir Thomas Lucy (1583/86 – 8 December 1640) of Charlecote Park, Warwickshire was an English politician who sat in the House of Commons at various times between 1614 and 1640.

== Early life ==
Lucy was the eldest surviving son of Thomas Lucy of Charlecote Park and his wife Constance Kingsmill, the daughter of Sir Richard Kingsmill of High Clere, Hampshire.

His grandfather Sir Thomas Lucy was an MP and is noted for prosecuting William Shakespeare although there is little evidence to support this claim.

== Career ==
In 1614, Lucy was elected Member of Parliament for Warwickshire. He held the seat through several elections until 1629 when King Charles decided to rule without parliament. He was High Sheriff of Warwickshire in 1632.

In April 1640, he was re-elected MP for Warwickshire in the Short Parliament. In November 1640 he was elected MP for Warwick in the Long Parliament but died in December.

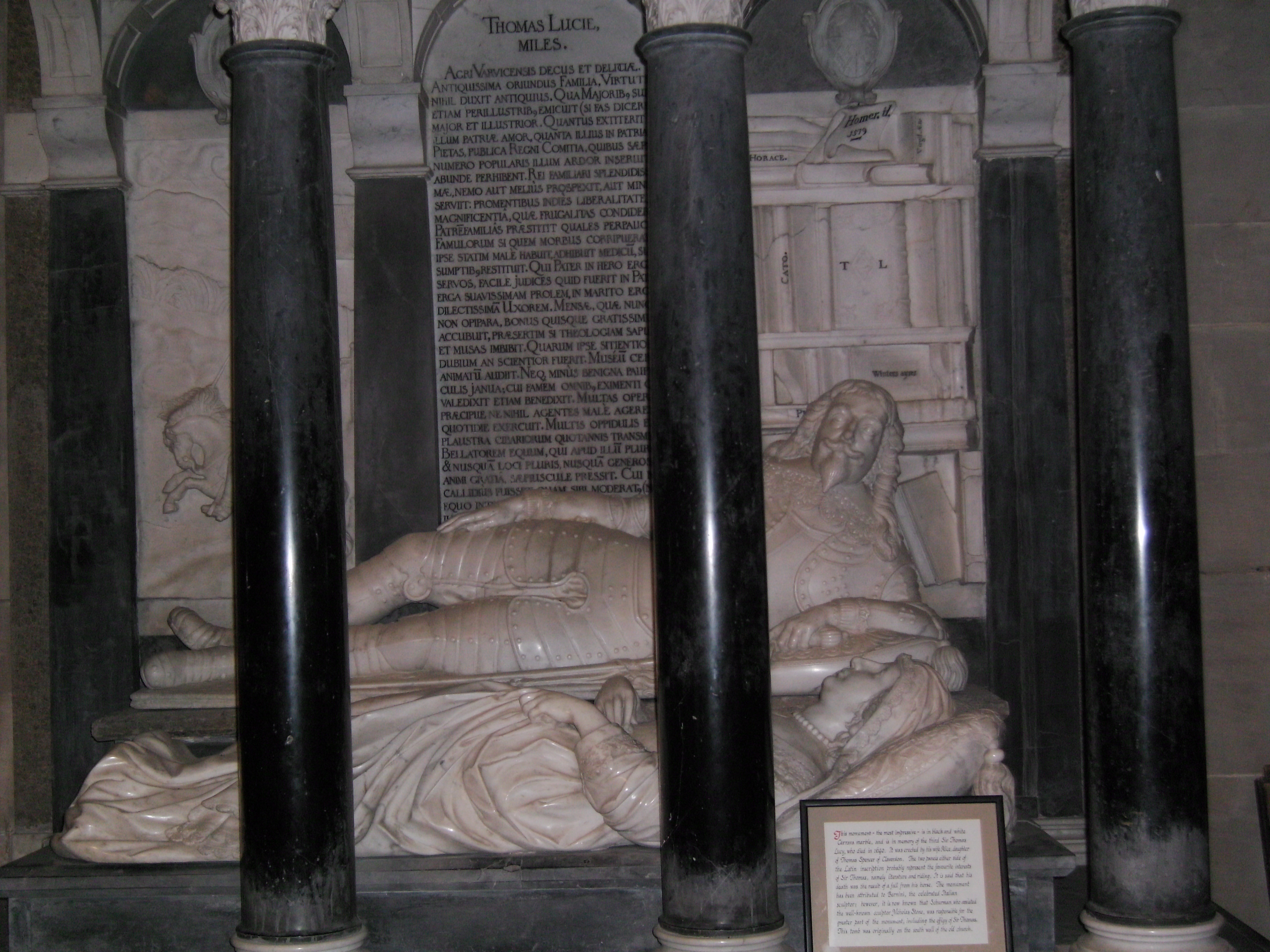
Tomb of Sir Thomas Lucy and Alice, his wife, in St. Leonard's church, Charlecote.

Lucy died after falling from his horse and was buried at St Leonard's Church, Charlecote. It was said of him that "his tables were ever open to the learned and his gates never fast to the poor".

== Family life ==
Lucy married Alice Spencer, daughter of Thomas Spencer of Claverden, Warwickshire. Alice was described as an archetypal gentlewoman, known for her charity and piety. They had twelve children, six sons and six daughters, including

- Sir Fulke Lucy
- Richard Lucy
- Constance Lucy, who married firstly Sir William Spencer and secondly Sir Edward Smith, Chief Justice of the Irish Common Pleas.

Parliament of England
Preceded by Sir Edward Greville; Sir Richard Verney	Member of Parliament for Warwickshire; 1614–1629; With: Sir Richard Verney 1614; Sir Fulke Greville 1621; Sir Francis Leigh 1621–1622; Sir Clement Throckmorton 1624–1626; Sir Thomas Leigh, 2nd Baronet 1628–1629	Parliament suspended until 1640
Parliament suspended since 1629	Member of Parliament for Warwickshire; 1640; With: William Combe	Succeeded by Richard Shuckburgh; James Compton
Preceded by William Purefoy; Godfrey Bosvile	Member of Parliament for Warwick; 1640; With: William Purefoy	Succeeded by William Purefoy; Godfrey Bosvile
