= Alice Lucy =

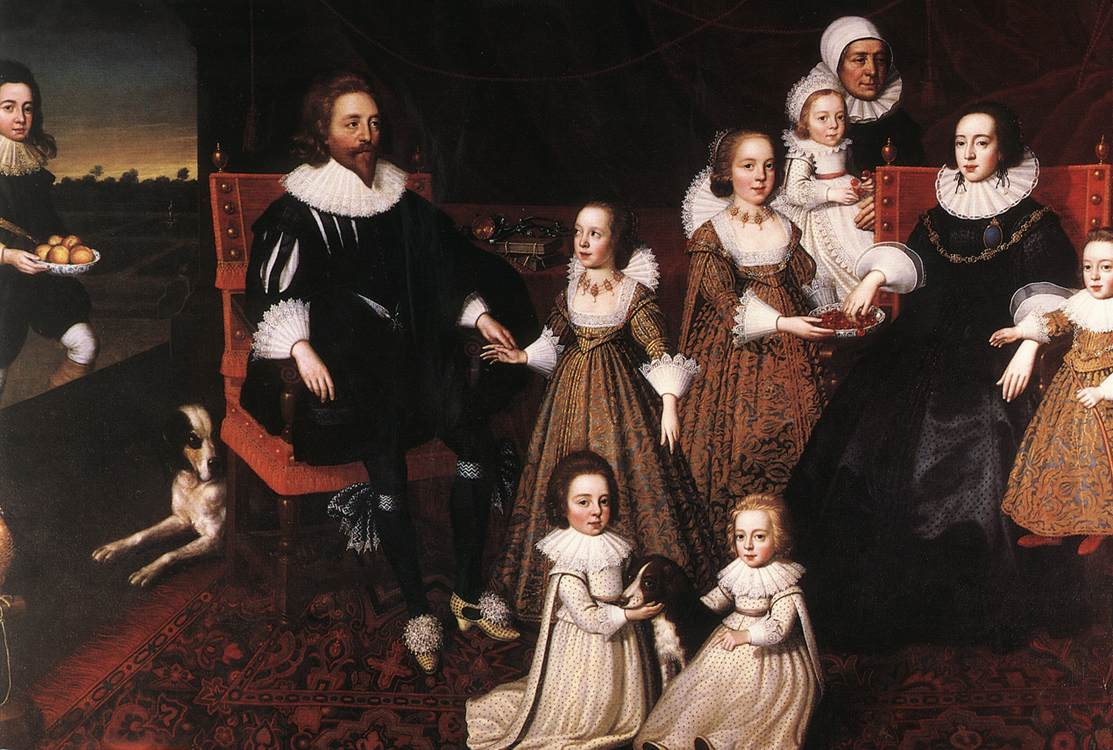
- Alice with her husband and children
- Born: Alice Spencer; 1594
- Died: August 1648 (aged 53–54)
- Known for: piety and charity
- Spouse: Sir Thomas Lucy

Alice Lucy or Lady Lucy (c.1594 – August 1648), born Alice Spencer, was a British puritan gentlewoman who was known for her charity and piety. She married into the property at Charlecote Park which she ran after her husband died in 1640.

== Early life ==
Alice Lucy was born Alice Spencer in or around the year 1594. She was the sole heiress of her father, Thomas Spencer of Claverdon in Warwickshire. She first met Thomas Lucy, who was to be her husband, when she was about eleven years of age.

== Marriage ==
Alice and her husband were said to have a perfect marriage. Alice first had three sons named Spencer, Robert and Richard who would in time inherit their father's title. She then had three other sons named Thomas, William and Foulk. The latter's eldest son, Davenport Lucy, would eventually inherit the house at Charlecote. Alice also had six daughters named Constance (who married firstly Sir William Spencer 2nd Baronet, and secondly Sir Edward Smith), Margaret, Bridget, Alice, Mary and Elizabeth.

== Husband ==
Her husband became a Member of Parliament for Warwickshire in 1615. He held the seat until 1629 when it was abolished. The King dismissed parliament that year and it was not recalled for over a decade. Her husband returned in 1640 as part of the Short Parliament. Later that year he was again re-elected to represent Warwick. However, he fatally fell from his horse in December of that year. After her husband was buried at St Leonard's Church in Charlecote she arranged for a large marble memorial to be constructed for her husband and herself inside the church. It was noted that she would always cite her husband's best features. The memorial notes that her husband's "tables were ever open to the learned and his gates never fast to the poor".

== Widowhood ==
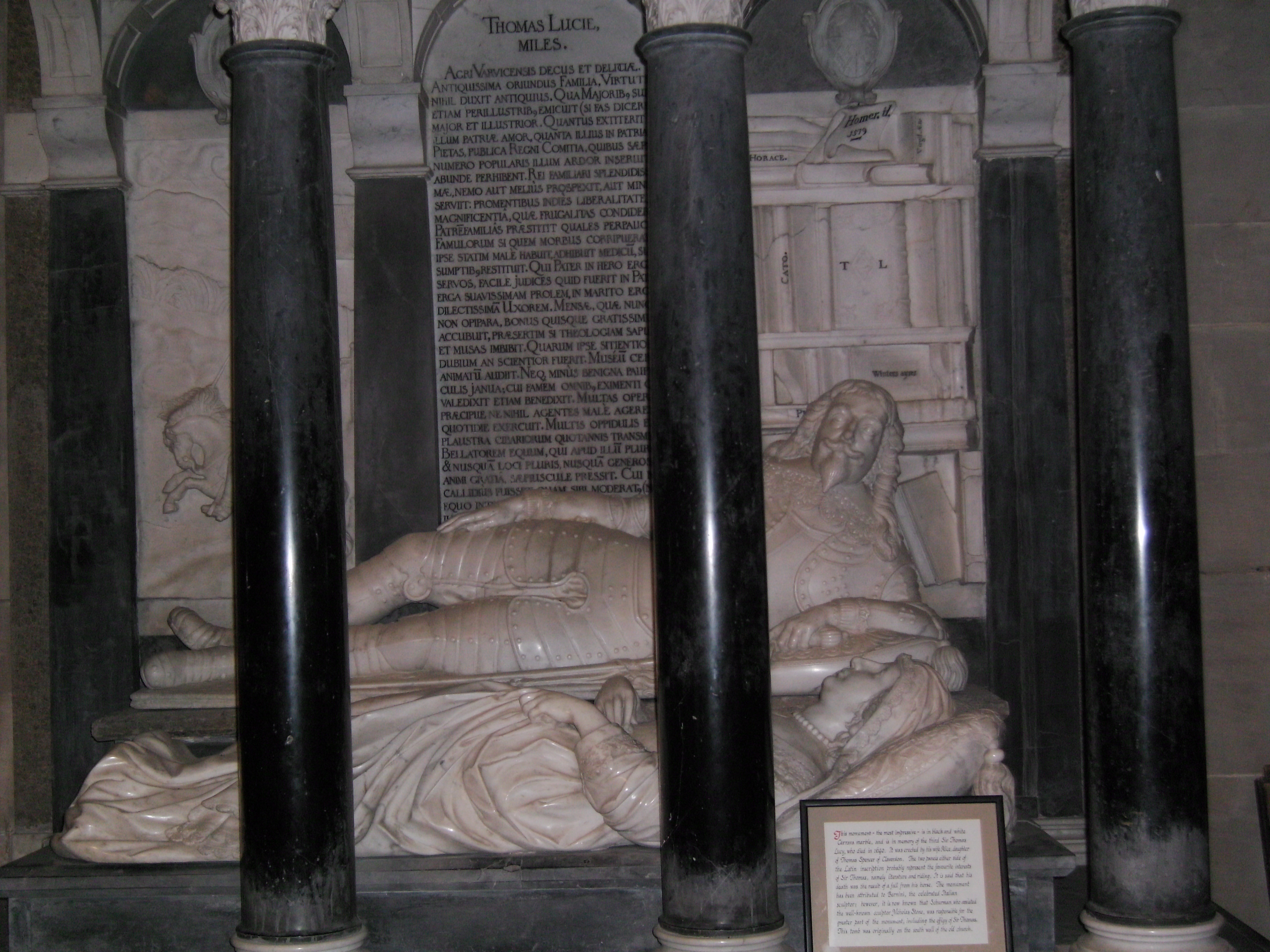
Alice and her husband's marble memorial

Her eldest son, Spencer, inherited his father's title, but after 1640 Alice was the de facto head of the household. She was a Puritan and each Christmas she would tour the area giving out meat and bread to those in nearby towns. She was known for her piety. Alice became an invalid so she employed a local schoolmaster, Thomas Dugard, as her preacher. Her children would read from the bible during the day and there was a sermon, a psalm sung and a mother's blessing every night. Dugard said that she "made a church of her house". In 1647 and 1648 there was a shortage of food in Warwickshire and Alice ensured that the poor had food. She ensured that where corn was sold that it was not just in large packages so that it was available to those who could only afford a small amount.

In 1648 both Alice and her eldest son died and her second son Robert inherited the title.
