= Robert Johnston (died 1687) =

English-born Irish politician and judge (died 1687)

- Died: 1687; London
- Occupations: Politician, Judge

Robert Johnston, or Johnson (died 1687) was an English-born politician and judge in seventeenth-century Ireland.

He was the eldest son of Edward Johnson, Bencher of the Inner Temple. Henry Bennet, 1st Earl of Arlington acknowledged him as his cousin and furthered his career. He entered the Inner Temple in 1644 and was called to the Bar in 1651. After the Restoration of Charles II, he accompanied Sir Edward Smith, a judge of the new Court of Claims, to Ireland as his secretary. Smith sat in the Irish House of Commons as member for Lisburn: when he vacated the seat in 1665, on his appointment as Chief Justice of the Irish Common Pleas, Johnson replaced him as MP. Smith canvassed the electors on his behalf as being "a worthy gentleman", and he also had the support of his cousin Lord Arlington, a rising man in the English Government.

Johnson entered the King's Inns in 1667 and became a Bencher. He was appointed a justice of the Court of Common Pleas (Ireland) in 1670. His health was always poor and in his later years, he spent much of his time in England. He was dismissed from the Bench for ill health in 1686, and died in London the following year. He was buried in the Temple Church.

He was married: his eldest son Robert Johnson junior was, like his father, an MP and a High Court judge. Unlike his father, he was also a "backroom" political figure of some importance.

== Sources ==
- Ball, F. Elrington The Judges in Ireland 1221-1921 London John Murray 1926
- Kenny, Colum King's Inns and the Kingdom of Ireland Irish Academic Press 1992
- Neill, Trevor Lisburn Parliamentary Representatives in the Seventeenth Century (1995) Lisburn Historical Society Journal Vol.9
