= Ardencote Manor =

Coordinates: 52.28807°N 1.70773°W

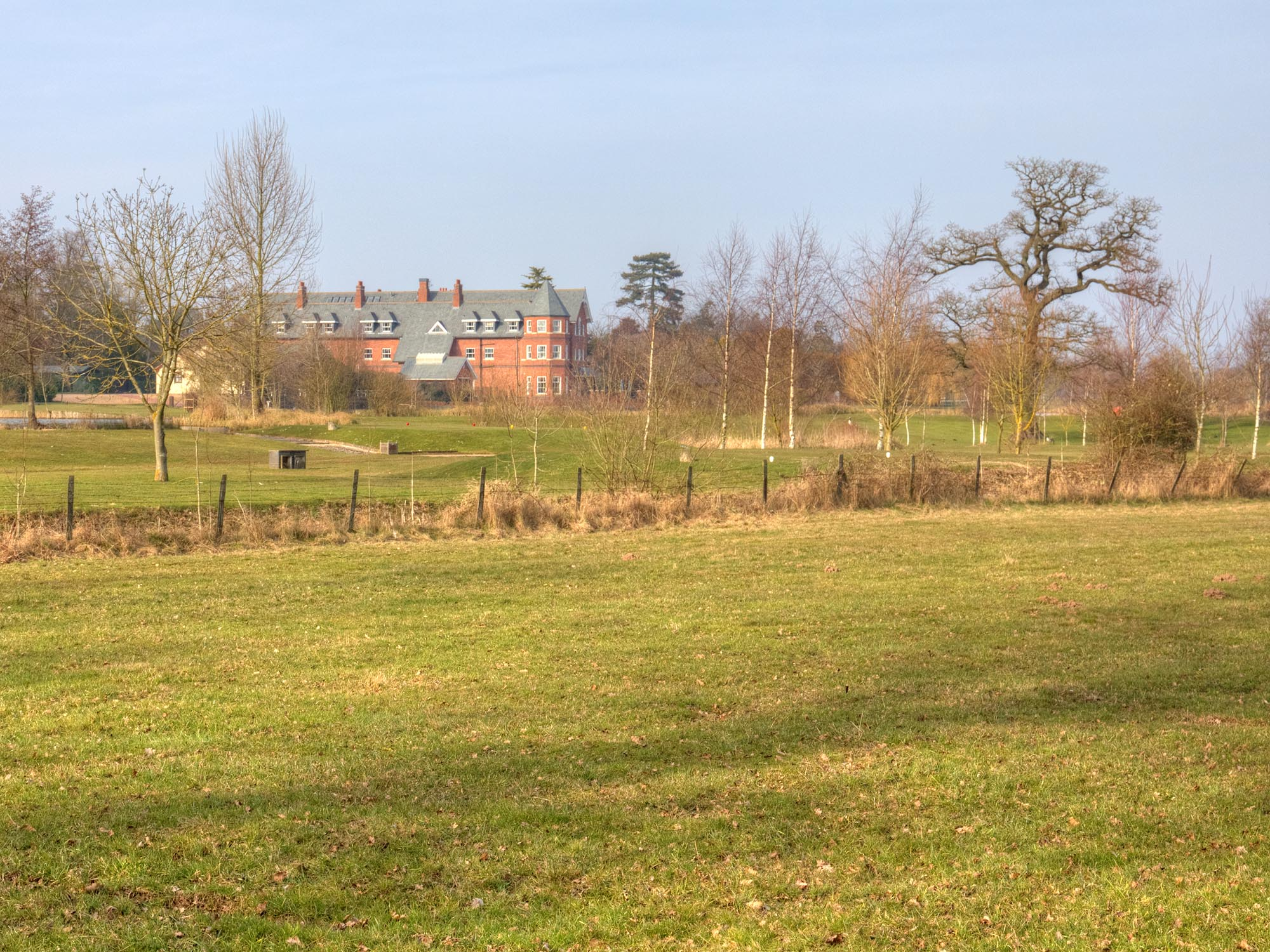
Ardencote Manor Hotel

Ardencote Manor is a hotel and former manor house located 0.5 miles (0.8 km) north of the village of Claverdon, Warwickshire, England.

The manor was originally built in 1863 as a dowry house for Mary Phillips, the daughter of a Manchester based wool merchant Thomas. The property passed through several owners until it was purchased in 1980 by a consortium with the idea of turning it into a hotel and country club. After several defaulted attempts the current owner, a Mr Huckerby, took it over in 1996 and finally got the project off the ground.

At present the hotel has conference rooms, spa facilities, a swimming pool, tennis courts and an 18-hole golf course.
