= Lisburn (Parliament of Ireland constituency) =

Pre-1801 Irish constituency

Coordinates: 54.511°N 6.043°W

- Former borough constituency for the Irish House of Commons
- County: County Antrim
- Borough: Lisburn

–1801
- Seats: 2
- Replaced by: Lisburn (UKHC)

Lisburn was a borough constituency which elected two MPs for the borough of Lisburn, County Antrim, to the Irish House of Commons, the house of representatives of the Kingdom of Ireland.

== Members of Parliament ==
Election	First MP	Second MP	
1661	Sir Edward Dering	Sir Edward Smith	
1665	Sir Edward Dering	Robert Johnston	
1692	Randal Brice	Edward Harrison	
1697	Popham Seymour-Conway	Edward Harrison	
1703	Michael Harrison	Richard Nutley	
1709	Brent Spencer	Richard Nutley	
1711	Brent Spencer	Robert Cope	Tory
1713	Brent Spencer	Francis Harrison	
1715	Brent Spencer	Edmond Francis Stafford	
1725	Brent Spencer	Thomas Clutterbuck	
1736	Nicholas Price	Thomas Clutterbuck	
1743	Robert Maxwell (Note: The Hon. Robert Maxwell from 1756.)	Thomas Clutterbuck	
1743	Robert Maxwell	Edward Smyth	
1759	Francis Price	Edward Smyth	
1761	Francis Price	Francis Seymour-Conway, Viscount Beauchamp	
1768	Francis Price	Marcus Paterson	
1771	Francis Price	Hon. Robert Seymour-Conway	
1776	FitzHerbert Richards	Richard Jackson (Note: Also returned for Coleraine, for which he chose to sit.)	
1777	FitzHerbert Richards	Richard Heron (Note: From 1778 Sir Richard Heron, Bt.)	
1783	William Sharman	William Todd Jones	
1790	George Hatton	John Moore	
1798	George Hatton	Stewart Bruce	
1801	Replaced by Westminster constituency Lisburn		
