= William Purefoy =

English politician

William Purefoy (c. 1580 – 8 Sep 1659) was an English politician who sat in the House of Commons of England variously between 1628 and 1659. He supported the Parliamentary cause in the English Civil War and was one of the regicides of King Charles I of England.

Born into a long-established Warwickshire family, Purefoy was educated at Cambridge University and Gray's Inn. He travelled extensively on the continent of Europe, returning with extreme Calvinist views.

He was elected member of parliament for Coventry in 1628 until 1629 when King Charles I decided to rule without parliament for eleven years. After serving a year as the High Sheriff of Warwickshire for 1631 he was elected in April 1640 MP for Coventry for the Short Parliament, and re-elected in November 1640 for the Long Parliament. He commanded a regiment of Warwickshire Horse during the First English Civil War until he was excluded by the Self-denying Ordinance of 1645. He was appointed Colonel of the Warwickshire Militia Horse in 1650 and was a member of the Council of State throughout the period of the Commonwealth. He was a member of the court which tried Charles I, signing the death-warrant.

He was elected MP for both Coventry and Warwickshire in the First Protectorate Parliament in 1654 and for Coventry alone in the Second Protectorate Parliament in 1656 and Third Protectorate Parliament in 1659. In 1659 he commanded the Parliamentary forces in Warwickshire during Booth's Insurrection.

He died in 1659 and left two married daughters. His estates were confiscated by the crown for his part in the regicide.
