= Charlecote Park =

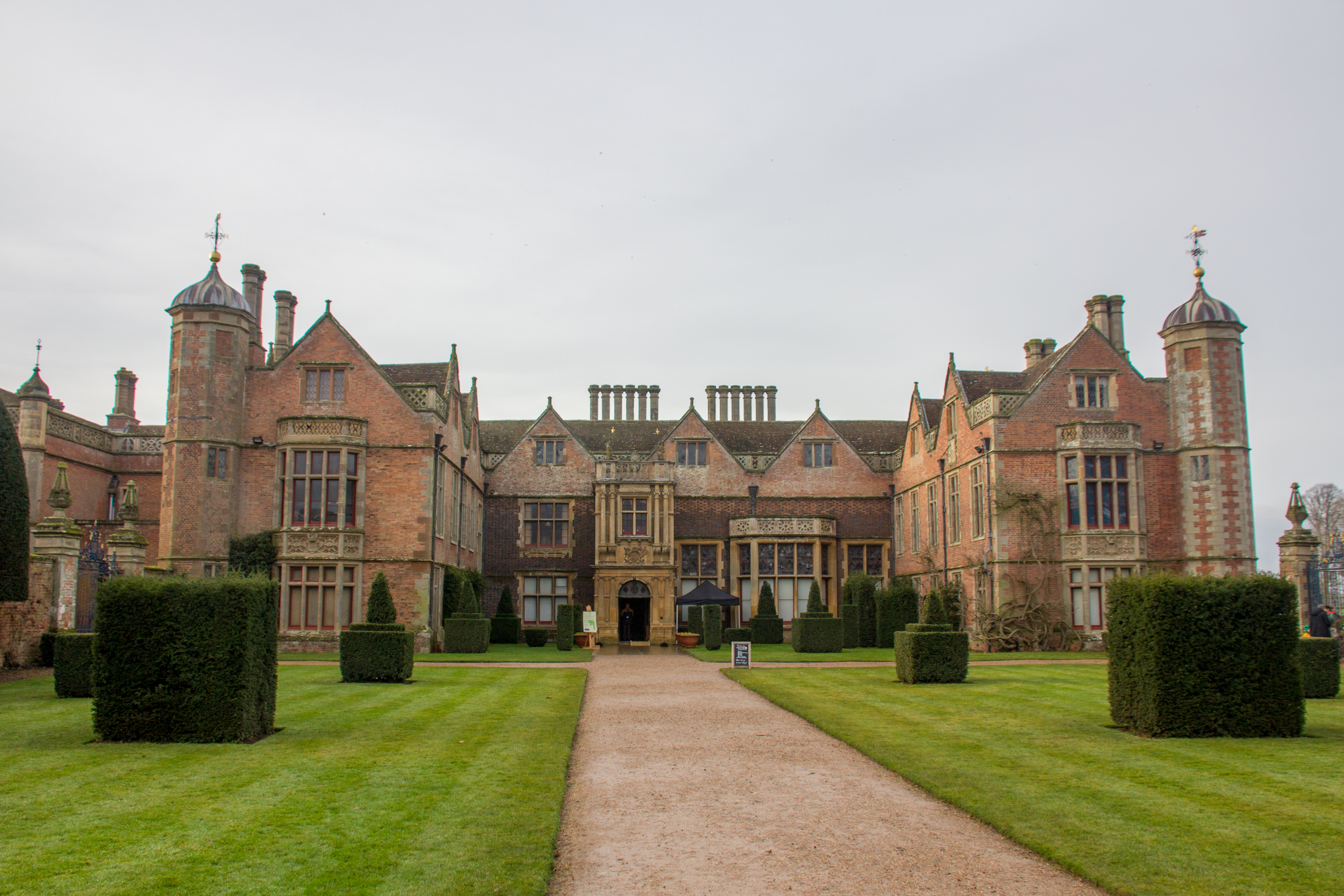
- View toward the front in 2017
- Interactive map of Charlecote Park
- 52.20534°N 1.62219°W
- Type: Country house
- Location: Charlecote, Warwickshire, England
- OS grid reference: SP263564

History
- Built: Mid 16th century

Site notes
- Owner: National Trust
- Website: nationaltrust.org.uk/charlecote-park

Listed Building – Grade I
- Official name: Charlecote Park
- Designated: 6 February 1952
- Reference no.: 1381799

Listed Building – Grade I
- Official name: Gatehouse to Charlecote Park
- Designated: 5 April 1967
- Reference no.: 1381800

Listed Building – Grade I
- Official name: Laundry and brewhouse and stables and coach house immediately south of Charlecote Park
- Designated: 5 April 1967
- Reference no.: 1381808

Listed Building – Grade II*
- Official name: North and south forecourt walls, gates, gate piers and returns
- Designated: 18 March 1997
- Reference no.: 1381805 / 1381802

Listed Building – Grade II*
- Official name: Lead statues of shepherd and shepherdess to north side of forecourt
- Designated: 18 March 1997
- Reference no.: 1381803 / 1381804

National Register of Historic Parks and Gardens
- Official name: Charlecote Park
- Type: Grade II*
- Designated: 1 February 1986
- Reference no.: 1001187

Charlecote Park is a grand 16th-century country house, surrounded by its own deer park, on the banks of the River Avon in Charlecote near Wellesbourne, about 4 miles (6 km) east of Stratford-upon-Avon and 5.5 miles (9 km) south of Warwick in Warwickshire, England. It has been administered by the National Trust since 1946. It is a Grade I listed building and is open to the public. The park and gardens are listed Grade II* in Historic England's Register of Parks and Gardens.

== History ==
The Lucy family owned the land from 1247. Charlecote Park was originally built in 1558 by Sir Thomas Lucy, and Queen Elizabeth I stayed in the room that is now the drawing room. Although the general outline of the original Elizabethan house remains, the present house is of mostly Victorian construction. Successive generations of the Lucy family modified Charlecote Park over the centuries until George Hammond Lucy (High Sheriff of Warwickshire in 1831) inherited the house in 1823 and set about recreating the house in its original Tudor style.

Charlecote Park covers 185 acres (75 ha), backing on to the River Avon. William Shakespeare was said to have poached rabbits and deer in the park as a young man, and to have been brought before the magistrates.

From 1605 to 1640, the house was occupied by Sir Thomas Lucy. He had twelve children with Lady Lucy, who ran the house after he died. She was known for her piety and for distributing alms to the poor each Christmas. Her eldest three sons each inherited the house in turn, then it fell to her grandson Sir Davenport Lucy.

High up on one wall in the Tudor great hall is the 1680 painting Captain Thomas Lucy by Sir Godfrey Kneller, dated 1680. It includes what is believed to be one of the earliest depictions of an enslaved black presence in the West Midlands. The painting includes a young black groom in the right hand background, dressed in a blue livery coat and red stockings and wearing a gleaming, metal collar around his neck. The National Trust notes that "It is not known if Kneller painted this unidentified figure from a model or if it is a portrait of a real groom in Captain Lucy's household".

In 1735, a black child called Philip Lucy was baptised at Charlecote.

The lands immediately adjoining the house were further landscaped by Capability Brown in about 1760. This resulted in Charlecote becoming a hostelry destination for notable tourists to Stratford from the late-18th to mid-19th century, including Washington Irving (1818), Sir Walter Scott (1828) and Nathaniel Hawthorne (c 1850).

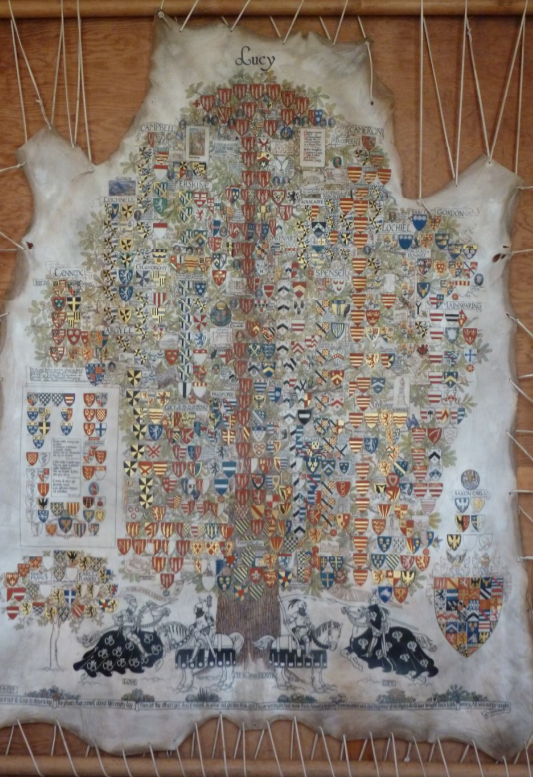
The "Lucy Deerskin" created by Edith Mary Hinchley

Charlecote was inherited in 1823 by George Hammond Lucy (d. 1845), who in December 1822 had married Mary Elizabeth Williams of Bodelwyddan Castle, Wales, upon whose extensive diaries the current "behind the scenes of Victorian Charlecote" are based. Seven years of major renovation and rebuilding, including an extension on the river side, were commenced in 1829 after a builder's survey had revealed grave defects in the fabric. G.H.Lucy's second son, Henry, inherited the estate in 1847 from his elder brother. In 1848, Mary Elizabeth Lucy had the "wretched old Anglo-Norman church" in the Park pulled down. A new church, built to her design, was completed and opened in February 1853.

In 1890, artist Edith Mary Hinchley worked on a family tree image on deerskin that involved the creation of 500 heraldic shields. She did the work because she was a genealogist and a friend of the family. The "Lucy Deerskin" is still at Charlecote Park. After the deaths of both Mary Elizabeth and Henry in 1890, the house was rented out by Henry's eldest daughter and heiress, Ada Christina (d. 1942). She had married Sir Henry Ramsay-Fairfax, (d. 1944), a line of the Fairfax Baronets, who on marriage assumed the name Fairfax-Lucy.

From this point onwards, the family began selling off parts of the outlying estate to fund their lifestyle. In 1946, Sir Montgomerie Fairfax-Lucy, who had inherited the residual estate from his mother Ada, presented Charlecote to the National Trust in lieu of death duties. Sir Montgomerie was succeeded in 1965 by his brother, Sir Brian, whose wife Alice researched the history of Charlecote and assisted the National Trust with the restoration of the house.

It is a Grade I listed building and is open to the public. The park and gardens are listed Grade II* in Historic England's Register of Parks and Gardens.

== Today ==
The Great Hall has a barrel vaulted ceiling made of plaster painted to look like timber and contains the collection of family portraits. Other rooms have richly coloured wallpaper, decorated plaster ceilings and wood panelling. There are magnificent pieces of furniture and fine works of art, including a contemporary painting of Queen Elizabeth I. The original two-storey Elizabethan gatehouse that guards the approach to the house remains unaltered.

On display at the house is an original letter from Oliver Cromwell, dated 1654, summoning then-owner Richard Lucy to Barebone's Parliament. Also on display is a 1760 portrait of George Lucy by Thomas Gainsborough, which cost Lucy the sum of eight guineas.

A set of archives for the Lucy family at Charlecote is held by the Warwickshire County Record Office. The house also has a display of carriages and a period laundry and brew room.

In April 2012, Charlecote Park featured as the venue for BBC One's Antiques Roadshow.

Charlecote Park has extensive grounds. A parterre has been recreated from the original 1700s plans. The livestock at Charlecote includes fallow deer and Jacob sheep, which were brought to England from Portugal in 1755 by George Lucy.

== Bibliography ==
- Charlecote and the Lucys: The Chronicle of an English Family (OUP, 1958) Alice Fairfax-Lucy
- History of the Commoners of Great Britain and Ireland, Volume 3 (1835) John Burke. Lucy of Charlecote pp 97–101. (ISBN 978-0-8063-0742-8)
- Historic England. "Charlecote Park (1381799)". National Heritage List for England.
- Mistress of Charlecote: The Memoirs of Mary Elizabeth Lucy 1803-1889. (Victor Gollancz 1983) Alice Fairfax-Lucy.
